= Lasiopetalum × tepperi =

Scientific classification
- Kingdom: Plantae
- Clade: Tracheophytes
- Clade: Angiosperms
- Clade: Eudicots
- Clade: Rosids
- Order: Malvales
- Family: Malvaceae
- Genus: Lasiopetalum
- Species: L. × tepperi

Binomial name
- Lasiopetalum × tepperi F.Muell.

Species of plant

Lasiopetalum × tepperi is a species of flowering plant in the family Malvaceae and is endemic to the south-east of South Australia. It is an erect, spreading or sprawling shrub with hairy stems, egg-shaped to lance-shaped leaves and pink flowers.

== Description ==
Lasiopetalum × tepperi is an erect, spreading shrub that typically grows to a height of 0.2–1 m (7.9 in – 3 ft 3.4 in), its stems covered with star-shaped hairs. The leaves are egg-shaped to lance-shaped, mostly 30–60 mm (1.2–2.4 in) long, 4–10 mm (0.16–0.39 in) wide and leathery, the lower surface covered with star-shaped hairs. The flowers are arranged in crowded or open heads of mostly six to ten. There are three bracteoles 3.5–7 mm (0.14–0.28 in) long at the base of the sepals, the sepals 4–7 mm (0.16–0.28 in) long, pink and moderately to densely hairy on the back.

== Taxonomy ==
Lasiopetalum × tepperi was first formally described in 1881 by Ferdinand von Mueller in Fragmenta Phytographiae Australiae from specimens collected by Johann Gottlieb Otto Tepper on Yorke Peninsula.

Philip Sydney Short notes that von Mueller suggested that L. tepperi was of hybrid origin in his original 1881 description, possibly between L. discolor and L. baueri. Short concluded that L. × tepperi is a hybrid between L. discolor, l. baueri and L. behrii. All three species occur with the hybrid in the same region of South Australia. Lasiopetalum × tepperi has not been observed to set seed.

== Distribution and habitat ==
This lasiopetalum grows in sand on coastal dunes and limestone on the Yorke and Eyre Peninsulas and on Kangaroo Island in South Australia.
