= Lasiopetalum dielsii =

Conservation status
- Priority Two — Poorly Known Taxa (DEC)

Scientific classification
- Kingdom: Plantae
- Clade: Tracheophytes
- Clade: Angiosperms
- Clade: Eudicots
- Clade: Rosids
- Order: Malvales
- Family: Malvaceae
- Genus: Lasiopetalum
- Species: L. dielsii

Binomial name
- Lasiopetalum dielsii Endl.

Species of plant

Lasiopetalum dielsii, is a species of flowering plant in the family Malvaceae and is endemic to the south-west of Western Australia. It is a spreading shrub with hairy stems, heart-shaped leaves and pink or white flowers.

== Description ==
Lasiopetalum dielsii is a spreading shrub that typically grows to a height of 0.5–1 m (1 ft 8 in – 3 ft 3 in), its foliage covered with star-shaped hairs. The leaves are heart-shaped, 30–80 mm (1.2–3.1 in) long and 10–30 mm (0.39–1.18 in) wide. Each flower is borne on a pedicel 4.0–4.5 mm (0.16–0.18 in) long, the sepals pink or white, the petals reduced to small scales or lobes and there are five stamens. Flowering occurs in December.

== Taxonomy ==
Lasiopetalum dielsii was first formally described in 1904 by Ernst Georg Pritzel in Beitrage zur Kenntnis der Pflanzen Westaustraliens, ihrer Verbreitung und ihrer Lebensverhaltnisse. The specific epithet (dielsii) honours Ludwig Diels.

== Distribution and habitat ==
This lasiopetalum grows on steep slopes in the Esperance Plains and Mallee biogeographic regions of south-western Western Australia.

== Conservation status ==
Lasiopetalum dielsii is listed as "Priority Two" by the Western Australian Government Department of Biodiversity, Conservation and Attractions, meaning that it is poorly known and from only one or a few locations.
