= Lasiopetalum compactum =

Scientific classification
- Kingdom: Plantae
- Clade: Tracheophytes
- Clade: Angiosperms
- Clade: Eudicots
- Clade: Rosids
- Order: Malvales
- Family: Malvaceae
- Genus: Lasiopetalum
- Species: L. compactum

Binomial name
- Lasiopetalum compactum Paust

Species of plant

Lasiopetalum compactum, is a species of flowering plant in the family Malvaceae and is endemic to the south-west of Western Australia. It is an erect shrub with leathery, narrowly oblong leaves and cymes of white to pinkish flowers.

== Description ==
Lasiopetalum compactum is an erect shrub that typically grows to a height of up to 1 m (3 ft 3 in), its branchlets covered with rust-coloured to grey, star-shaped hairs. The leaves are leathery, narrowly oblong, 10–60 mm (0.39–2.36 in) long and 4–13 mm (0.16–0.51 in) wide on a hairy petiole 5–7 mm (0.20–0.28 in) long. The upper surfaces of the leaves is more or less glabrous and the lower surface is covered with woolly, star-shaped hairs, the mid-rib prominent. The flowers are arranged in cymes of five to seven 30–50 mm (1.2–2.0 in) long, the peduncle 5–15 mm (0.20–0.59 in) long with linear bracts about 5 mm (0.20 in) long at the base and three linear bracteoles about 7 mm (0.28 in) long at the base of the sepals. The sepals are pink, densely covered with white, woolly star-shaped hairs on the back and 5–8 mm (0.20–0.31 in) long with five narrowly egg-shaped lobes. The petals are spatula-shaped, about 1 mm (0.039 in) long and there are five stamens. Flowering occurs from July to October.

== Taxonomy ==
Lasiopetalum compactum was first formally described in 1974 by Susan Paust in the journal Nuytsia from specimens collected near Ravensthorpe in 1968. The specific epithet (compactum) "refers to the inflorescence".

== Distribution and habitat ==
This lasiopetalum grows on rocky hillsides and among granite rocks, between the Fitzgerald River and Mount Burdett in the Esperance Plains and Mallee biogeographic regions of south-western Western Australia.

== Conservation status ==
Lasiopetalum compactum is listed as "not threatened" by the Government of Western Australia Department of Biodiversity, Conservation and Attractions.
