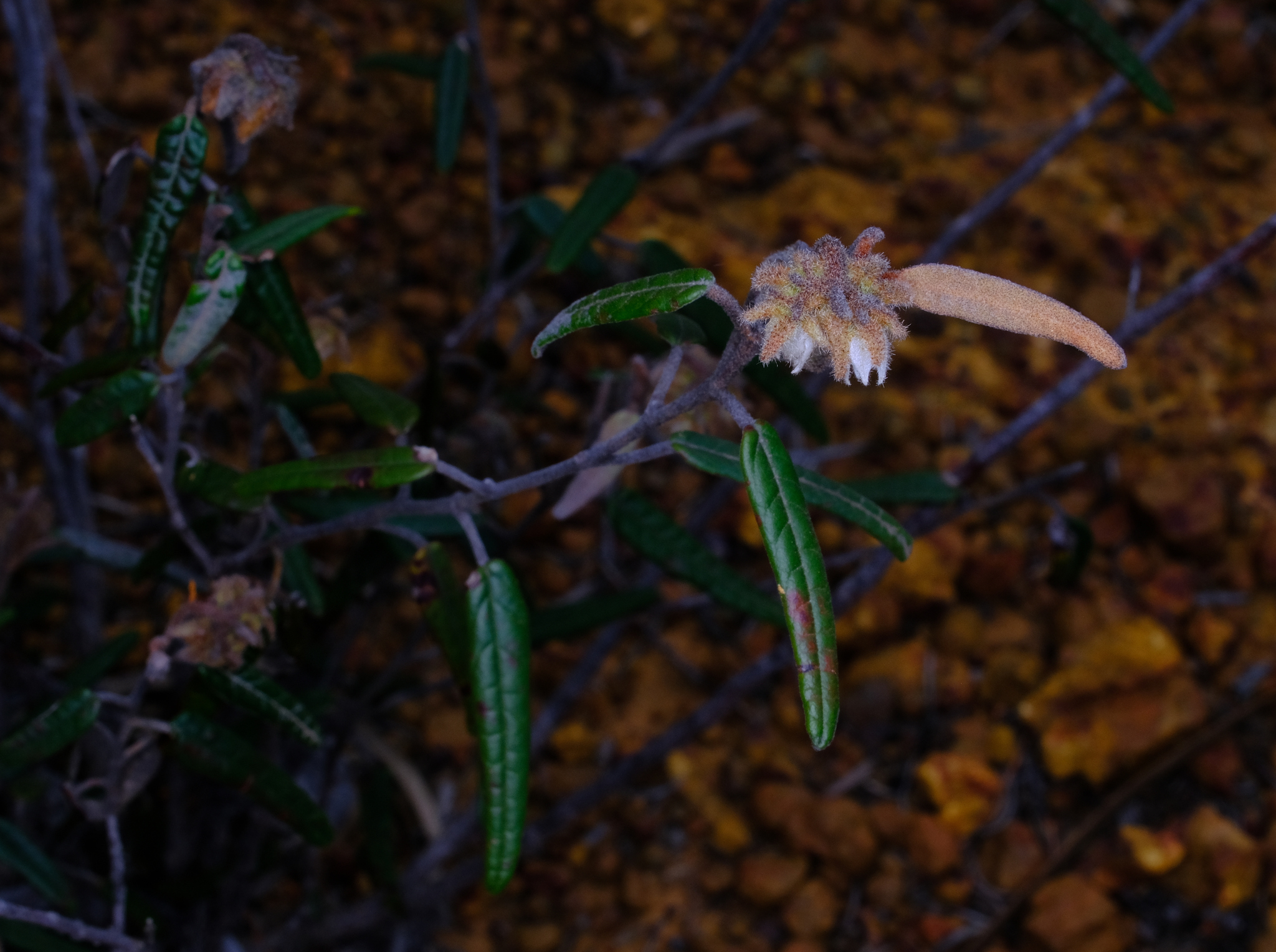

Scientific classification
- Kingdom: Plantae
- Clade: Tracheophytes
- Clade: Angiosperms
- Clade: Eudicots
- Clade: Rosids
- Order: Malvales
- Family: Malvaceae
- Genus: Lasiopetalum
- Species: L. ferraricollinum

Binomial name
- Lasiopetalum ferraricollinum E.M.Benn. & K.A.Sheph.

= Lasiopetalum ferraricollinum =

Species of plant

Lasiopetalum ferraricollinum is a species of flowering plant in the family Malvaceae and is endemic to the south-west of Western Australia. It is an upright shrub with densely hairy stems, narrow egg-shaped to oblong leaves and white to cream-coloured and dark red flowers.

== Description ==
Lasiopetalum ferraricollinum is an upright shrub typically 0.25–1 m (1–3 ft) high and wide, its stems covered with rust-coloured, star-shaped hairs, at least when young. The leaves are narrow egg-shaped to oblong, 25–70 mm (1.0–2.8 in) long and 5–15 mm (0.2–0.6 in) wide on a petiole 5–20 mm (0.2–0.8 in) long. The leaves are densely covered with white or rust-coloured, star-shaped hairs. The flowers are arranged in groups of mostly five to nine on rusty-hairy peduncle 10–27 mm (0.4–1.1 in) long, each flower on a pedicel 0.7–1 mm (0.03–0.04 in) long with an oblong bracts 1.4–3 mm (0.06–0.12 in) long at the base. There are three bracteoles 2–6 mm (0.08–0.24 in) long at the base of the sepals, the sepal lobes 5.0–6.5 mm (0.20–0.26 in) long, white to cream-coloured and densely hairy on the back. The five petals are dark red, 0.5–0.8 mm (0.02–0.03 in) long and the stamens have red and cream anthers. Flowering occurs from August to October.

== Taxonomy ==
Lasiopetalum ferraricollinum was first formally described in 2007 by Eleanor Marion Bennett and Kelly Anne Shepherd in the journal Nuytsia from specimens collected near Forrestiana. The specific epithet (ferraricollinum) is derived from Latin words meaning "pertaining to iron" and "living on low hills", referring to the ironstone hills where this species grows.

== Distribution and habitat ==
This lasiopetalum grows in mallee shrubland on ironstone and laterite hills in the Coolgardie and Mallee biogeographic regions of south-western Western Australia.

== Conservation status ==
Lasiopetalum ferraricollinum is listed as "not threatened" by the Department of Biodiversity, Conservation and Attractions.
