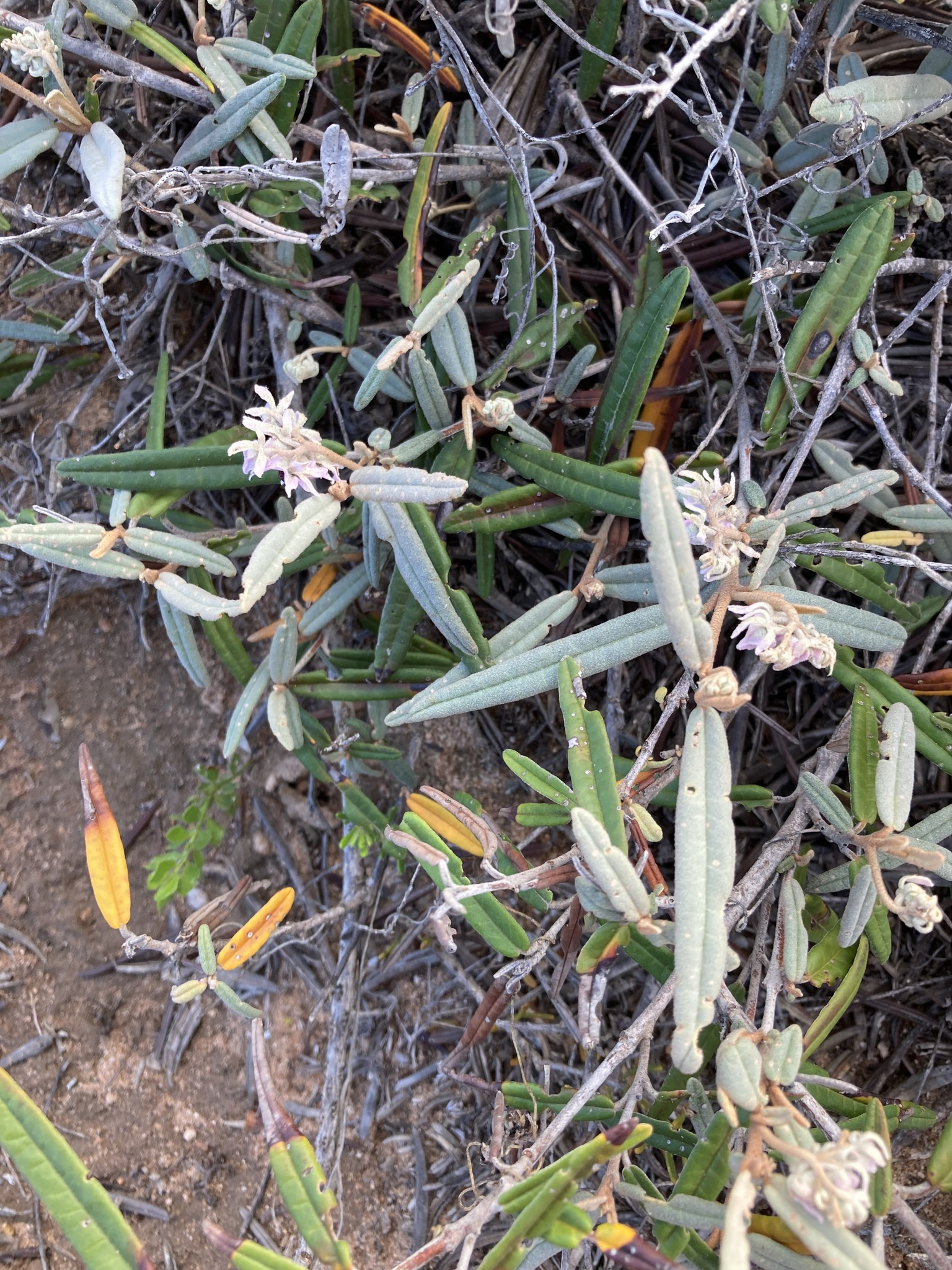

Scientific classification
- Kingdom: Plantae
- Clade: Tracheophytes
- Clade: Angiosperms
- Clade: Eudicots
- Clade: Rosids
- Order: Malvales
- Family: Malvaceae
- Genus: Lasiopetalum
- Species: L. angustifolium

Binomial name
- Lasiopetalum angustifolium W.Fitzg.

= Lasiopetalum angustifolium =

Narrow leaved lasiopetalum

Species of plant

Lasiopetalum angustifolium, commonly known as narrow leaved lasiopetalum, is a species of flowering plant in the family Malvaceae and is endemic to coastal areas of south-western Western Australia. It is a low spreading or dense, compact shrub with narrowly egg-shaped to narrowly elliptic leaves and compact groups of pink to purplish flowers.

== Description ==
Lasiopetalum angustifolium is a spreading or dense, compact shrub typically 15–150 cm (5.9–59.1 in) high and 40–150 cm (16–59 in) wide, its young stems covered with rust-coloured, star-shaped hairs. The leaves are narrowly egg-shaped to narrowly elliptic, 22–100 mm (0.87–3.94 in) long and 2–10 mm (0.079–0.394 in) wide on a petiole 2–8 mm (0.079–0.315 in) long. The lower surface of the leaves is covered with rust-coloured and white, star-shaped hairs and the edges of the leaves are turned downwards or rolled under. The flowers are arranged in compact groups of five to eighteen on a hairy peduncle 11–28 mm (0.43–1.10 in) long, each flower on a pedicel 1.8–3.2 mm (0.071–0.126 in) long with an egg-shaped bract 0.9–2.5 mm (0.035–0.098 in) long at the base. There are three further bracts mostly 4.7–9.8 mm (0.19–0.39 in) long at the base of the sepals, the sepals pale brown on the outer side, with lobes 4.4–5.3 mm (0.17–0.21 in) long. The five petals are egg-shaped with the narrower end towards the base, dark red, 1.2–1.9 mm (0.047–0.075 in) long and glabrous. Flowering occurs from July to October and the fruit is an oval capsule 2.5–3.0 mm (0.098–0.118 in) long.

== Taxonomy ==
Lasiopetalum angustifolium was first formally described in 1904 by William Vincent Fitzgerald in the Journal of the West Australian Natural History Society from specimens he collected near Geraldton in 1903. The specific epithet (angustifolium) means "narrow-leaved".

== Distribution and habitat ==
This lasiopetalum grows in tall shrubland, scrub and heath in near-coastal areas from Shark Bay to near Perth and on a few off-shore islands.

== Conservation status ==
Lasiopetalum angustifolium is listed as "not threatened" by the Western Australian Government Department of Biodiversity, Conservation and Attractions.
