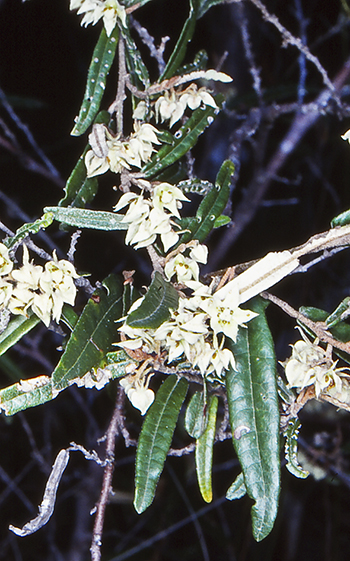
- In Bournda National Park

Scientific classification
- Kingdom: Plantae
- Clade: Tracheophytes
- Clade: Angiosperms
- Clade: Eudicots
- Clade: Rosids
- Order: Malvales
- Family: Malvaceae
- Genus: Lasiopetalum
- Species: L. parviflorum

Binomial name
- Lasiopetalum parviflorum Rudge

Synonyms
- Lasiopetalum parviflorum Rudge var. parviflorum

= Lasiopetalum parviflorum =

Species of shrub

Lasiopetalum parviflorum is a species of flowering plant in the family Malvaceae and is endemic to south-eastern continental Australia. It is a shrub with rusty-hairy stems, more or less glabrous leaves with the edges rolled under, and greenish to cream-coloured flowers.

== Description ==
Lasiopetalum parviflorum is a shrub that typically grows to a height of 0.5–1 m (1 ft 8 in – 3 ft 3 in) high and has its young stems densely covered with rust-coloured, star-shaped hairs. The leaves are arranged alternately along the stems, mostly 30–60 mm (1.2–2.4 in) long and 3–7 mm (0.12–0.28 in) wide with the edges rolled under. The lower surface of the leaves is densely covered with grey and rust-coloured, star-shaped hairs. The flowers are borne in small groups on a short peduncle and are greenish to cream-coloured with more or less linear bracteoles 1.5–2.0 mm (0.059–0.079 in) long below the base of the sepals. The petal-like sepal lobes are about 3 mm (0.12 in) long, with woolly white hairs on the back. Flowering occurs in spring and the fruit is a woolly-hairy capsule 3–5 mm (0.12–0.20 in) in diameter.

== Taxonomy ==
Lasiopetalum parviflorum was first formally described in 1811 by Edward Rudge in Transactions of the Linnean Society of London. The specific epithet (parviflorum) means "small-flowered".

== Distribution and habitat ==
This lasiopetalum grows in grassy woodland and forest on the coast and nearby ranges of New South Wales and south-eastern Queensland.
