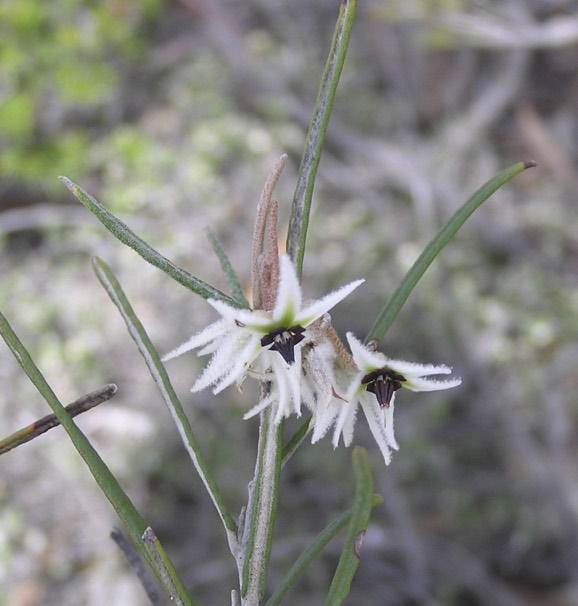
- Near Lake King

Scientific classification
- Kingdom: Plantae
- Clade: Tracheophytes
- Clade: Angiosperms
- Clade: Eudicots
- Clade: Rosids
- Order: Malvales
- Family: Malvaceae
- Genus: Lasiopetalum
- Species: L. rosmarinifolium

Binomial name
- Lasiopetalum rosmarinifolium (Turcz.) Benth.

Synonyms
- Lasiopetalum leucogriseum E.M.Benn. MS; Lasiopetalum rosmarinifolium var. latifolia Benth. orth. var.; Lasiopetalum rosmarinifolium var. latifolium (Turcz.) Benth.; Lasiopetalum rosmarinifolium (Turcz.) Benth. var. rosmarinifolium; Lasiopetalum sp. Kukerin (C.A.Gardner 13646) WA Herbarium; Sarotes latifolia Turcz.; Sarotes rosmarinifolia Turcz.

= Lasiopetalum rosmarinifolium =

Species of plant

Lasiopetalum rosmarinifolium is a species of flowering plant in the family Malvaceae and is endemic to the south-west of Western Australia. It is an erect or spreading shrub with hairy stems and leaves, linear leaves and white flowers.

== Description ==
Lasiopetalum rosmarinifolium is an erect or spreading shrub that typically grows to a height of 0.3–1 m (1 ft 0 in – 3 ft 3 in), its stems and leaves covered with star-shaped hairs. The leaves are linear, 15–60 mm (0.59–2.36 in) long and 2–4 mm (0.079–0.157 in) wide. The flowers are arranged in small groups, each flower on a pedicel 2.5–3 mm (0.098–0.118 in) long with three hairy bracteoles 2.5–6 mm (0.098–0.236 in) long at the base of the sepals. The sepals are white, 6.5–10 mm (0.26–0.39 in) long, fused for less than half their length, and there are no petals. The anthers are 2.2–2.4 mm (0.087–0.094 in) long on filaments 1.5–2.5 mm (0.059–0.098 in) long. Flowering occurs from June to November.

== Taxonomy ==
This species was first formally described in 1852 by Nikolai Turczaninow who gave it the name Sorotes rosmarinifolia in Bulletin de la Société Impériale des Naturalistes de Moscou from specimens collected by James Drummond. In 1863, George Bentham changed the name to Lasiopetalum rosmarinifolium in Flora Australiensis. The specific epithet (rosmarinifolium) means "rosemary-leaved".

== Distribution and habitat ==
This lasiopetalum grows in sandy and gravelly soils in the Avon Wheatbelt, Esperance Plains, Hampton and Mallee biogeographic regions of south-western Western Australia.

== Conservation status ==
Lasiopetalum rosmarinifolium is listed as "not threatened" by the Western Australian Government Department of Biodiversity, Conservation and Attractions.
