= Lasiopetalum membranaceum =

Conservation status
- Priority Three — Poorly Known Taxa (DEC)

Scientific classification
- Kingdom: Plantae
- Clade: Tracheophytes
- Clade: Angiosperms
- Clade: Eudicots
- Clade: Rosids
- Order: Malvales
- Family: Malvaceae
- Genus: Lasiopetalum
- Species: L. membranaceum

Binomial name
- Lasiopetalum membranaceum (Steud.) Benth.

Species of shrub

Lasiopetalum membranaceum is a species of flowering plant in the family Malvaceae and is endemic to near-coastal areas of south-western Western Australia. It is an erect, spreading shrub or subshrub with hairy young stems, egg-shaped leaves and mauve-pink and dark red flowers.

== Description ==
Lasiopetalum membranaceum is an erect, spreading shrub or subshrub that typically grows to a height of 30–50 cm (12–20 in) and has its young stems densely covered with star-shaped hairs. The leaves are pliable, egg-shaped, mostly 19–39 mm (0.75–1.54 in) long and 11–27 mm (0.43–1.06 in) wide on a petiole 10–21 mm (0.39–0.83 in) long, the upper surface more or less glabrous and the lower surface covered with star-shaped hairs. The flowers are borne in loose groups of seven to fourteen flowers, the groups 38–81 mm (1.5–3.2 in) long on a peduncle 19–31 mm (0.75–1.22 in) long, each flower on a pedicel 4.2–9.5 mm (0.17–0.37 in) long with egg-shaped, mauve-pink bracteoles 3.2–6.5 mm (0.13–0.26 in) long below the base of the sepals. The sepals are also mauve-pink with a dark red base, 5.3–6.3 mm (0.21–0.25 in) long with narrowly egg-shaped lobes 4.9–6.5 mm (0.19–0.26 in) long. There are no petals and the anthers are 1.4–1.9 mm (0.055–0.075 in) long on a filament 0.5–0.6 mm (0.020–0.024 in) long. Flowering occurs from September to December.

== Taxonomy ==
This taxon was first formally described in 1845 by Ernst Gottlieb von Steudel who gave it the name Corethrostylis membranacea in Johann Georg Christian Lehmann's Plantae Preissianae. In 1863, George Bentham changed the name to Lasiopetalum membranaceum in Flora Australiensis. The specific epithet (membranaceum) means "membranous", referring to the leaves.

== Distribution and habitat ==
This lasiopetalum grows in forest or woodland in near-coastal areas and occurs from Perth (including in Kings Park) to near Augusta in the Jarrah Forest, Swan Coastal Plain and Warren biogeographic area of southern Western Australia.

== Conservation status ==
Lasiopetalum membranaceum is listed as "Priority Three" by the Government of Western Australia Department of Biodiversity, Conservation and Attractions, meaning that it is poorly known and known from only a few locations but is not under imminent threat.
