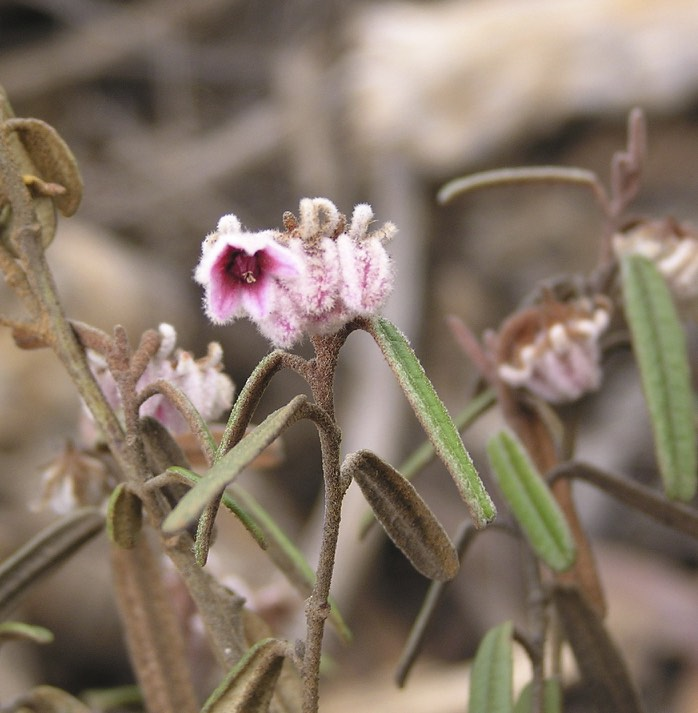

Conservation status
- Priority Three — Poorly Known Taxa (DEC)

Scientific classification
- Kingdom: Plantae
- Clade: Tracheophytes
- Clade: Angiosperms
- Clade: Eudicots
- Clade: Rosids
- Order: Malvales
- Family: Malvaceae
- Genus: Lasiopetalum
- Species: L. parvuliflorum

Binomial name
- Lasiopetalum parvuliflorum F.Muell.

Synonyms
- Lasiopetalum parviflorum var. occidentale Benth.

= Lasiopetalum parvuliflorum =

Species of shrub

Lasiopetalum parvuliflorum is a species of flowering plant in the family Malvaceae and is endemic to the south-west of Western Australia. It is an erect, spreading shrub with hairy stems, oblong to linear leaves and green or cream-coloured flowers.

== Description ==
Lasiopetalum parvuliflorum is an erect, spreading shrub that typically grows to a height of 0.35–1 m (1 ft 2 in – 3 ft 3 in) and has hairy stems. The leaves are 20–70 mm (0.79–2.76 in) long and 5–10 mm (0.20–0.39 in) wide. The flowers are borne on a pedicel 1–2.5 mm (0.039–0.098 in) long with bracteoles 2.5–6 mm (0.098–0.236 in) long below the base of the sepals. The sepals are petal-like, green or cream-coloured, 6–8 mm (0.24–0.31 in) long fused at their bases and hairy. The petals are 0.8–1.2 mm (0.031–0.047 in) long and glabrous, the anthers 2.4–2.6 mm (0.094–0.102 in) long on a filament 1.2–1.7 mm (0.047–0.067 in) long. Flowering occurs in September and October.

== Taxonomy ==
Lasiopetalum parvuliflorum was first formally described in 1868 by Ferdinand von Mueller in Fragmenta Phytographiae Australiae from specimens collected by James Drummond. The specific epithet (parvuliflorum) means "very small-flowered".

== Distribution and habitat ==
This lasiopetalum grows near creeks and in winter-wet areas in the Esperance Plains and Mallee biogeographic region of south-western Western Australia.

== Conservation status ==
Lasiopetalum parvuliflorum is listed as "Priority Three" by the Government of Western Australia Department of Biodiversity, Conservation and Attractions, meaning that it is poorly known and known from only a few locations but is not under imminent threat.
