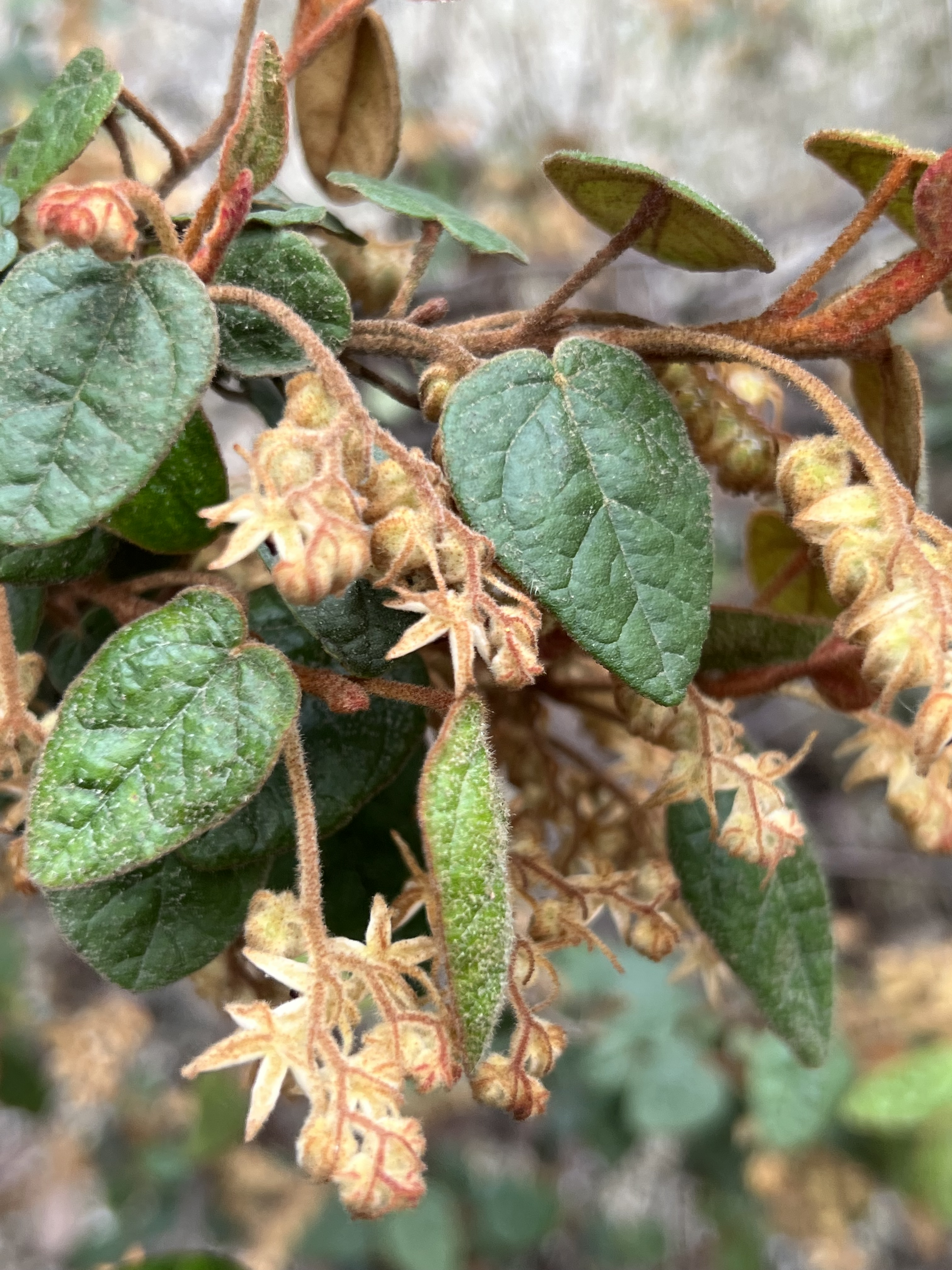

Conservation status
- Priority One — Poorly Known Taxa (DEC)

Scientific classification
- Kingdom: Plantae
- Clade: Tracheophytes
- Clade: Angiosperms
- Clade: Eudicots
- Clade: Rosids
- Order: Malvales
- Family: Malvaceae
- Genus: Lasiopetalum
- Species: L. ogilvieanum

Binomial name
- Lasiopetalum ogilvieanum F.Muell.

= Lasiopetalum ogilvieanum =

Species of shrub

Lasiopetalum ogilvieanum is a species of flowering plant in the family Malvaceae and is endemic to the south-west of Western Australia. It is an open, spindly or rounded shrub with rusty-hairy young stems, narrowly egg-shaped to narrowly elliptic leaves and white or pink and dark red flowers.

== Description ==
Lasiopetalum ogilvieanum is an open, spindly or rounded shrub that typically grows to a height of 0.5–1.5 m (1 ft 8 in – 4 ft 11 in), its stems covered with white or rust-coloured, star-shaped hairs. The leaves are narrowly egg-shaped to narrowly elliptic, mostly 31–68 mm (1.2–2.7 in) long and 4–18 mm (0.16–0.71 in) wide on a petiole 3–12 mm (0.12–0.47 in) long. The flowers are borne in loose groups of 8 to 21, 52–98 mm (2.0–3.9 in) long, each group on a peduncle 18–39 mm (0.71–1.54 in) long, each flower on a pedicel 3.0–6.5 mm (0.12–0.26 in) long with narrowly egg-shaped to linear bracts 1.6–4 mm (0.063–0.157 in) long at the base and three bracteoles 4–8 mm (0.16–0.31 in) long below the base of the sepals. The sepals are bright pink with a dark pink base, the lobes 4.8–6.2 mm (0.19–0.24 in) long and hairy on the back. The petals are 0.7–0.9 mm (0.028–0.035 in) long and dark red, the anthers dark red and 2.3–3.5 mm (0.091–0.138 in) long on filaments 1.2–2.2 mm (0.047–0.087 in) long. Flowering occurs from July to October.

== Taxonomy ==
Lasiopetalum ogilvieanum was first formally described in 1881 by Ferdinand von Mueller in Fragmenta Phytographiae Australiae from specimens he collected near the Greenough and Irwin Rivers. The specific epithet (ogilvieanum) honours Andrew J. Ogilvie, who accompanied Mueller on his expedition to Shark Bay.

== Distribution and habitat ==
This lasiopetalum grows in heathy woodland from near Dongara to near Eneabba in the Avon Wheatbelt and Geraldton Sandplains biogeographic regions of south-western Western Australia.

== Conservation status ==
Lasiopetalum ogilvieanum is listed as "Priority One" by the Government of Western Australia Department of Biodiversity, Conservation and Attractions, meaning that it is known from only one or a few locations which are potentially at risk.
