= Lasiopetalum lineare =

Scientific classification
- Kingdom: Plantae
- Clade: Tracheophytes
- Clade: Angiosperms
- Clade: Eudicots
- Clade: Rosids
- Order: Malvales
- Family: Malvaceae
- Genus: Lasiopetalum
- Species: L. lineare

Binomial name
- Lasiopetalum lineare Paust

Species of shrub

Lasiopetalum lineare is a species of flowering plant in the family Malvaceae and is endemic to the south-west of Western Australia. It is an erect shrub with densely hairy young stems, linear leaves and bright pink and dark red flowers.

== Description ==
Lasiopetalum lineare is an erect shrub that typically 10–50 cm (3.9–19.7 in) high and 20–35 cm (7.9–13.8 in) wide, its young stems covered with white and rust-coloured, star-shaped hairs. The leaves are linear, mostly 24–78 mm (0.94–3.07 in) long and 1.3–2 mm (0.051–0.079 in) wide on a petiole 1–3 mm (0.039–0.118 in) long and with the edges curved down or rolled under. Both surfaces of the leaves are covered with white and rust-coloured, star-shaped hairs. The flowers are borne in loose groups of seven to fifteen 25–53 mm (0.98–2.09 in) long, each group on a peduncle 15–32 mm (0.59–1.26 in) long, each flower on a pedicel 1.0–4.5 mm (0.039–0.177 in) long with linear to narrowly egg-shaped bracts 2.5–5.3 mm (0.098–0.209 in) long at the base and up to three similar bracteoles 3.5–7.2 mm (0.14–0.28 in) long below the base of the sepals. The sepals are bright pink with a darker base, the lobes narrowly egg-shaped 6.1–8.6 mm (0.24–0.34 in) long and the petals are dark red and about 0.5 mm (0.020 in) long. The anthers are dark red and 1.1–1.5 mm (0.043–0.059 in) long. Flowering occurs from August to November.

== Taxonomy ==
Lasiopetalum lineare was first formally described in 1974 by Susan Paust in the journal Nuytsia from specimens collected by Robert Royce near Watheroo in 1954. The specific epithet (lineare) means "linear", referring to the leaves.

== Distribution and habitat ==
This lasiopetalum grows in woodland or heath between Gingin and Eneabba in the Geraldton Sandplains and Swan Coastal Plain biogeographic regions of south-western Western Australia.

== Conservation status ==
Lasiopetalum lineare is listed as "not threatened" by the Government of Western Australia Department of Biodiversity, Conservation and Attractions.
