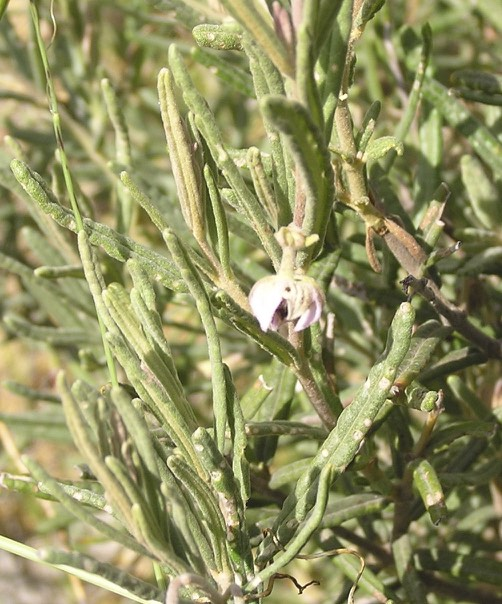

Conservation status
- Priority Three — Poorly Known Taxa (DEC)

Scientific classification
- Kingdom: Plantae
- Clade: Tracheophytes
- Clade: Angiosperms
- Clade: Eudicots
- Clade: Rosids
- Order: Malvales
- Family: Malvaceae
- Genus: Lasiopetalum
- Species: L. oppositifolium

Binomial name
- Lasiopetalum oppositifolium F.Muell.

= Lasiopetalum oppositifolium =

Species of shrub

Lasiopetalum oppositifolium is a species of flowering plant in the family Malvaceae and is endemic to the south-west of Western Australia. It is an open, erect shrub with rusty-hairy young stems, linear, narrowly elliptic or narrowly egg-shaped leaves and white, pink and dark red flowers.

== Description ==
Lasiopetalum oppositifolium is an open, erect, multi-stemmed shrub that typically grows to 0.3–1 m (1 ft 0 in – 3 ft 3 in) high and 0.5–1 m (1 ft 8 in – 3 ft 3 in) wide and has it young stems densely covered with woolly, rust-coloured hairs at first. The leaves are arranged in opposite pairs, narrowly elliptic or narrowly egg-shaped, 41–80 mm (1.6–3.1 in) long and 2.5–7 mm (0.098–0.276 in) wide on a petiole 1–4 mm (0.039–0.157 in) long and with the edges rolled under. The lower surface of the leaves is densely covered with white and rust-coloured, star-shaped hairs, the upper surface only hairy when very young. The flowers are borne in loose groups of four to seven, 10–24 mm (0.39–0.94 in) long, each group on a hairy peduncle 5–15 mm (0.20–0.59 in) long, each flower on a pedicel 0.8–1.6 mm (0.031–0.063 in) long with narrowly egg-shaped bracts 1.7–2.7 mm (0.067–0.106 in) long at the base and three bracteoles 2.7–4.7 mm (0.11–0.19 in) long below the base of the sepals. The sepals are white or pale pink, sometimes with a darker pink base, the lobes 2.1–3.1 mm (0.083–0.122 in) long, white and hairy on the back. The petals are 0.4–0.8 mm (0.016–0.031 in) long and dark red, the anthers dark red and 1.0–1.5 mm (0.039–0.059 in) long on filaments 0.5–0.9 mm (0.020–0.035 in) long. Flowering occurs from July to September.

== Taxonomy ==
Lasiopetalum oppositifolium was first formally described in 1860 by Ferdinand von Mueller in Fragmenta Phytographiae Australiae from specimens collected near the Murchison River by Augustus Oldfield. The specific epithet (oppositifolium) means "opposite-leaved".

== Distribution and habitat ==
This lasiopetalum grows on cliffs, gorge slopes and breakaways in shrubland or scrub in a few places near Kalbarri in the Geraldton Sandplains biogeographic region of south-western Western Australia.

== Conservation status ==
Lasiopetalum oppositifolium is listed as "Priority Three" by the Government of Western Australia Department of Biodiversity, Conservation and Attractions, meaning that it is poorly known and known from only a few locations but is not under imminent threat.
