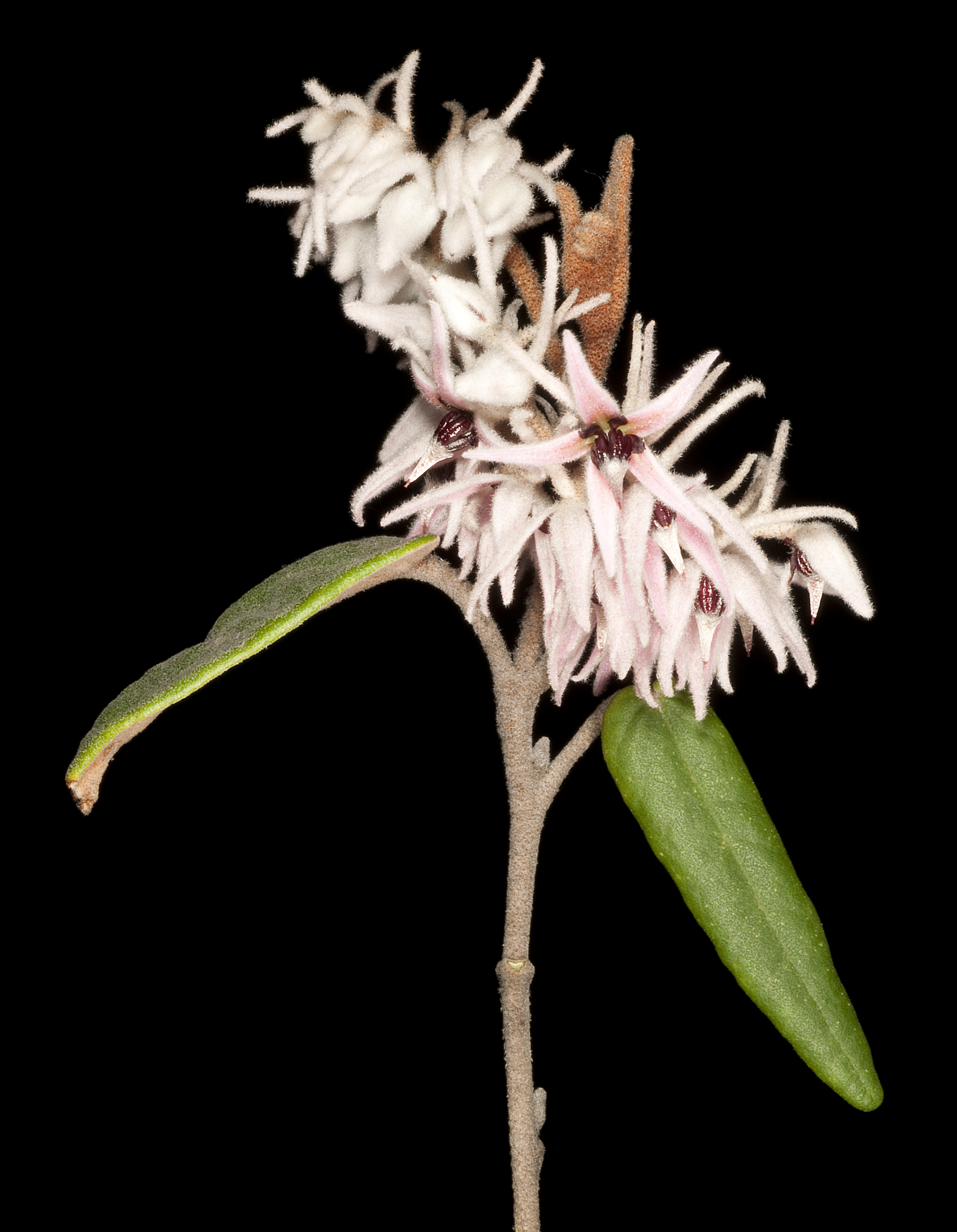

Scientific classification
- Kingdom: Plantae
- Clade: Tracheophytes
- Clade: Angiosperms
- Clade: Eudicots
- Clade: Rosids
- Order: Malvales
- Family: Malvaceae
- Genus: Lasiopetalum
- Species: L. drummondii

Binomial name
- Lasiopetalum drummondii Benth.

= Lasiopetalum drummondii =

Species of plant

Lasiopetalum drummondii is a species of flowering plant in the family Malvaceae and is endemic to the south-west of Western Australia. It is an erect, slender shrub with many densely hairy stems, egg-shaped or oblong leaves and white, pink and red flowers.

== Description ==
Lasiopetalum drummondii is an erect, slender shrub that typically grows to a height of 0.1–1 m (3.9 in – 3 ft 3.4 in) with its many stems with rust-coloured, star-shaped hairs. The leaves are egg-shaped or oblong, 15–37 mm (0.59–1.46 in) long, 6–18 mm (0.24–0.71 in) wide on a petiole 2–21 mm (0.079–0.827 in) long, the lower surface densely covered with rust-coloured, star-shaped hairs. The flowers are arranged in groups 19–47 mm (0.75–1.85 in) long with 13 to 31 flowers on hairy peduncles 9–21 mm (0.35–0.83 in) long, each flower on a pedicel 0.7–2.5 mm (0.028–0.098 in) long with narrowly egg-shaped bracts 2.5–6.5 mm (0.098–0.256 in) long at the base. There are up to three bracteoles 5.0–8.5 mm (0.20–0.33 in) long at the base of the sepals. The sepals are 6.6–10.4 mm (0.26–0.41 in) long, pink and densely hairy on the back. The petals are red, 0.7–1.7 mm (0.028–0.067 in) long and the stamens have dark red anthers. Flowering occurs from May to November and the fruit is elliptic and about 4 mm (0.16 in) long.

== Taxonomy ==
Lasiopetalum drummondii was first formally described in 1863 by George Bentham in Flora Australiensis from specimens collected by James Drummond. The specific epithet (drummondii) honours the collector of the type specimen.

== Distribution and habitat ==
This lasiopetalum grows in sandy soil in low woodland, shrubland or heath from near Dongara and Lesueur National Park to south of Cataby in the Geraldton Sandplains and Swan Coastal Plain biogeographic regions of south-western Western Australia.

== Conservation status ==
Lasiopetalum drummondii is listed as "not threatened" by the Department of Biodiversity, Conservation and Attractions.
