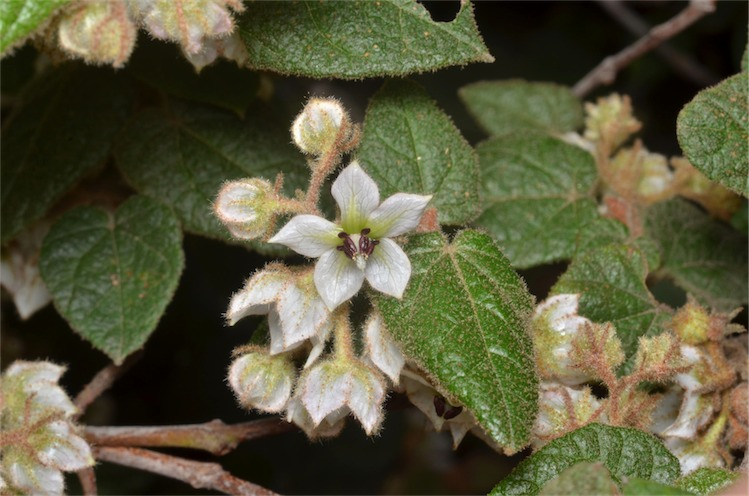
- In the Australian National Botanic Gardens

Scientific classification
- Kingdom: Plantae
- Clade: Tracheophytes
- Clade: Angiosperms
- Clade: Eudicots
- Clade: Rosids
- Order: Malvales
- Family: Malvaceae
- Genus: Lasiopetalum
- Species: L. schulzenii

Binomial name
- Lasiopetalum schulzenii (F.Muell.) Benth.

Synonyms
- Corethrostylis schulzenii F.Muell.

= Lasiopetalum schulzenii =

Drooping velvet-bush

Species of plant

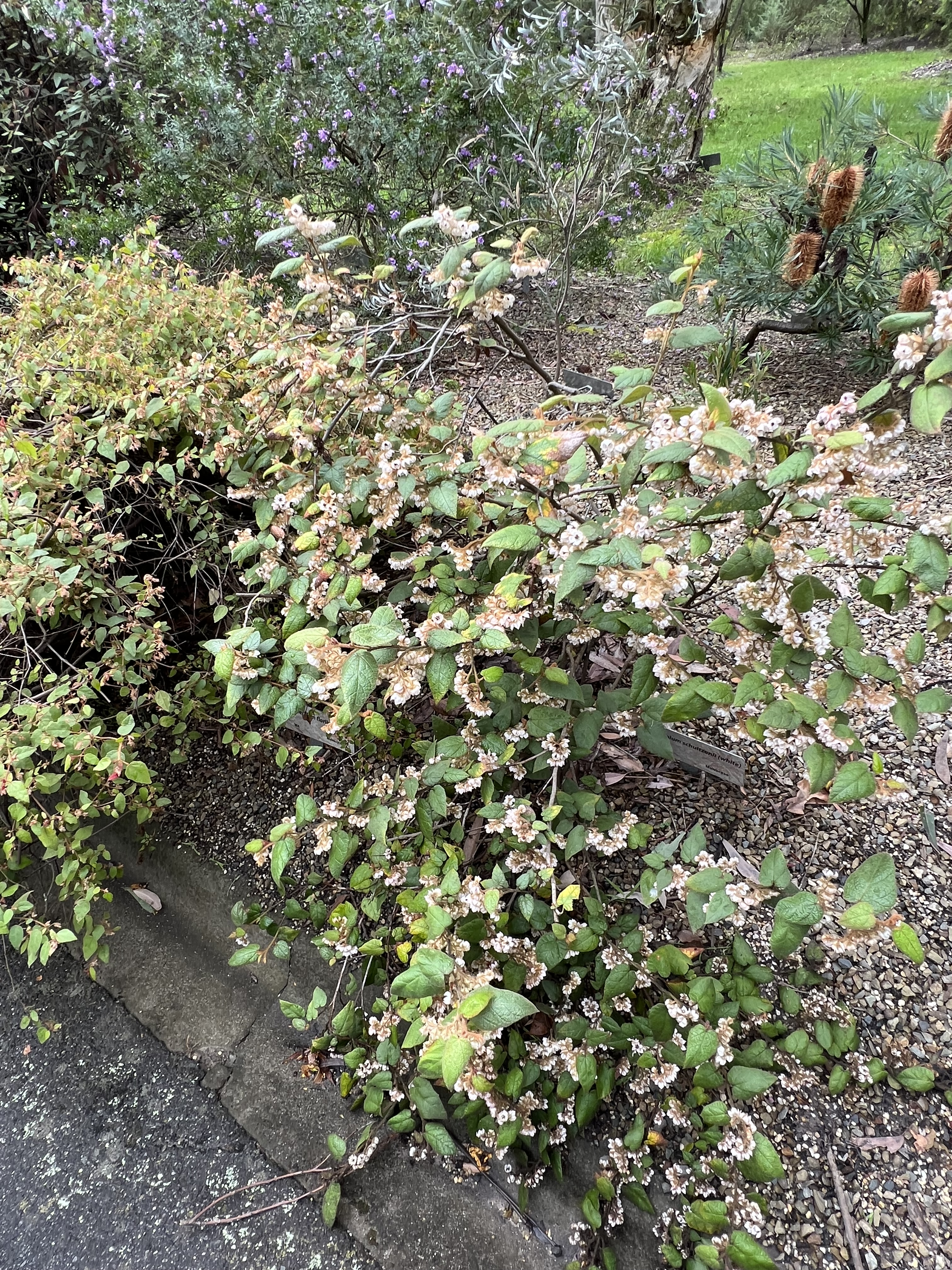
Habit

Lasiopetalum schulzenii, commonly known as drooping velvet-bush, is a species of flowering plant in the family Malvaceae and is endemic to southern continental Australia. It is a shrub with heart-shaped leaves and small groups of hairy white and reddish-brown flowers.

== Description ==
Lasiopetalum schulzenii is a spreading, many-stemmed, densely foliaged shrub to 2 m (6.6 ft) in height and 2.5 m (8.2 ft) across. The grey-green foliage is covered in fine hair, which is particularly prominent on new growth. The leaves are heart-shaped (cordate), and measure 2–7 cm (1–3 in) long and 1.5–5 cm (0.59–1.97 in) wide with recurved margins. Flowering occurs from September to February, the cymes bearing from five to twelve five-pointed star-shaped flowers 1.5 cm (0.59 in) in diameter. The sepals are whitish, 6–10 mm (0.24–0.39 in) long and densely covered with fine hair on the outside, less so or smooth on the inside. The five petals are about 1 mm (0.039 in) long and dark red-brown. Flowering is followed by round hairy fruit 4 mm (0.16 in) in diameter.

== Taxonomy ==
Drooping velvet-bush was first formally described in 1855 by Ferdinand von Mueller who gave it the name Corethrostylis schulzenii in his book Definitions of rare or hitherto undescribed Australian plants, later published in the Transactions of the Philosophical Society of Victoria. In 1863, George Bentham changed the name to Lasiopetalum schulzenii in Flora Australiensis. The specific epithet (schulzenii) honours the 19th century botanist Ludwig F. Schulzen.

== Distribution and habitat ==
Lasiopetalum schulzenii grows on clifftops and in woodland and heath in the south-east of South Australia, including on Kangaroo Island and near Port Campbell and Portland south-western Victoria, where it is rare. It grows on alkaline sands, and is associated with Eucalyptus diversifolia subsp. megacarpa.

== Use in horticulture ==
Lasiopetalum schulzenii has potential in horticulture, the compact foliage and flowering are features. It tolerates well-drained soils in sun or part-shaded aspect. It is frost hardy and can tolerate extended dry periods. Propagation is by seed or cutting. It has also been classified as somewhat fire retardant.
