= Lasiopetalum laxiflorum =

Conservation status
- Priority Three — Poorly Known Taxa (DEC)

Scientific classification
- Kingdom: Plantae
- Clade: Tracheophytes
- Clade: Angiosperms
- Clade: Eudicots
- Clade: Rosids
- Order: Malvales
- Family: Malvaceae
- Genus: Lasiopetalum
- Species: L. laxiflorum

Binomial name
- Lasiopetalum laxiflorum (Benth.) F.Muell.

Synonyms
- Thomasia laxiflora Benth.

Species of shrub

Lasiopetalum laxiflorum is a species of flowering plant in the family Malvaceae and is endemic to the south-west of Western Australia. It is a sticky, straggling subshrub or shrub with many densely hairy stems, egg-shaped leaves, and bright pink and dark red flowers.

== Description ==
Lasiopetalum laxiflorum is a sticky, straggling shrub or subshrub typically 0.3–1.5 m (1 ft 0 in – 4 ft 11 in) high and 0.2–1.5 m (7.9 in – 4 ft 11.1 in) wide with many stems densely covered with woolly, white and rust-coloured, star-shaped hairs. The leaves are egg-shaped, mostly 22–65 mm (0.87–2.56 in) long and 11–75 mm (0.43–2.95 in) wide, both surfaces covered with star-shaped hairs. The flowers are borne in leaf axils in groups 53–118 mm (2.1–4.6 in) long with 6 to 25 flowers on a peduncle 19–50 mm (0.75–1.97 in) long, each flower on a pedicel 4.5–7.5 mm (0.18–0.30 in) long with very narrow egg-shaped or linear bracts at the base. There are three similar bracteoles 1.5–3.5 mm (0.059–0.138 in) long near the base of the sepals. The sepals are bright pink with a dark red base, 5.5–8.5 mm (0.22–0.33 in) long with lobes 5.1–5.8 mm (0.20–0.23 in) long. The back of the sepals is sticky with dark red glandular hairs. The petals are dark red and egg-shaped 0.8–1.4 mm (0.031–0.055 in) long and the anthers are dark red with a white tip and 2.5–4 mm (0.098–0.157 in) long. Flowering has been recorded from October to January.

== Taxonomy ==
This species was first formally described in 1863 by George Bentham who gave it the name Thomasia laxiflora in Flora Australiensis from specimens collected by James Drummond in the Swan River Colony. In 1881, Ferdinand von Mueller changed the name to Lasiopetalum laxiflorum in Fragmenta Phytographiae Australiae. The specific epithet (laxiflorum) means "loose- or open-flowered".

== Distribution and habitat ==
Lasiopetalum laxiflorum grows in woodland and forest in or near the Whicher Range in the Jarrah Forest and Swan Coastal Plain biogeographic regions of south-western Western Australia.

== Conservation status ==
Lasiopetalum laxiflorum is listed as "Priority Three" by the Government of Western Australia Department of Biodiversity, Conservation and Attractions, meaning that it is poorly known and known from only a few locations but is not under imminent threat.
