= Lasiopetalum cordifolium =

Scientific classification
- Kingdom: Plantae
- Clade: Tracheophytes
- Clade: Angiosperms
- Clade: Eudicots
- Clade: Rosids
- Order: Malvales
- Family: Malvaceae
- Genus: Lasiopetalum
- Species: L. cordifolium

Binomial name
- Lasiopetalum cordifolium Endl.

Species of plant

Lasiopetalum cordifolium, is a species of flowering plant in the family Malvaceae and is endemic to the south-west of Western Australia. It is an erect shrub with hairy stems, heart-shaped leaves and pink, cream-coloured or white flowers.

== Description ==
Lasiopetalum cordifolium is an erect shrub that typically grows to a height of 0.4–1.5 m (1 ft 4 in – 4 ft 11 in), its foliage covered with star-shaped hairs. The leaves are heart-shaped, 15–55 mm (0.59–2.17 in) long and 10–35 mm (0.39–1.38 in) wide. The flowers are arranged in cymes, each flower on a pedicel 3.5–4.2 mm (0.14–0.17 in) long with bracteoles 2.5–4 mm (0.098–0.157 in) long at the base of the sepals. The sepals are pink, cream-coloured or white, covered with star-shaped hairs and 5.0–6.4 mm (0.20–0.25 in) long with lobes about half the length of the sepals. The petals are reduced to small scaled or lobes and there are five stamens. Flowering occurs from September to December.

== Taxonomy ==
Lasiopetalum cordifolium was first formally described in 1837 by Stephan Endlicher in Enumeratio plantarum quas in Novae Hollandiae ora austro-occidentali ad fluvium Cygnorum et in sinu Regis Georgii collegit Carolus Liber Baro de Hügel from specimens collected from King George Sound. The specific epithet (cordifolium) means "heart-leaved".

== Distribution and habitat ==
This lasiopetalum grows on rocky outcrops, slopes and ridges in the Avon Wheatbelt, Esperance Plains and Jarrah Forest biogeographic regions of south-western Western Australia.

== Conservation status ==
Lasiopetalum cordifolium is listed as "not threatened" by the Government of Western Australia Department of Biodiversity, Conservation and Attractions.
