= Lasiopetalum cenobium =

Conservation status
- Priority One — Poorly Known Taxa (DEC)

Scientific classification
- Kingdom: Plantae
- Clade: Tracheophytes
- Clade: Angiosperms
- Clade: Eudicots
- Clade: Rosids
- Order: Malvales
- Family: Malvaceae
- Genus: Lasiopetalum
- Species: L. cenobium

Binomial name
- Lasiopetalum cenobium K.A.Sheph. & C.F.Wilkins

Species of plant

Lasiopetalum cenobium, is a species of flowering plant in the family Malvaceae and is endemic to a restricted part of the south-west of Western Australia. It is only known from the type location, not having been collected since 1918.

== Description ==
Lasiopetalum cenobium has stems densely covered with woolly, star-shaped hairs. The leaves are egg-shaped, 17–43 mm (0.67–1.69 in) long and 12–29 mm (0.47–1.14 in) wide on a woolly-hairy petiole 9–24 mm (0.35–0.94 in) long, the edges turned downwards. The upper surface of the leaves sparsely covered with white, star-shaped hairs and the lower surface densely covered with white and rust-coloured, star-shaped hairs. The flowers are arranged in loose groups of three to five, 75–95 mm (3.0–3.7 in) long, the peduncles hairy and 28–65 mm (1.1–2.6 in) long, each flower on a pedicel 8.5–10 mm (0.33–0.39 in) long with thread-like bracts about 8 mm (0.31 in) long at the base and three further thread-like bracts 10.5–14 mm (0.41–0.55 in) long near the base of the sepals. The sepals are pink with a dark red base, about 11.5–15 mm (0.45–0.59 in) long with five egg-shaped lobes about 9 mm (0.35 in) long, and there are no petals.

== Taxonomy ==
Lasiopetalum cenobium was first formally described in 2015 by Kelly Anne Shepherd and Carolyn F. Wilkins in the journal Nuytsia from specimens collected in New Norcia in 1918. The specific epithet (cenobium) means "monastery", referring to the monastic town of New Norcia where the only two known specimens were collected in 1918.

== Distribution and habitat ==
This lasiopetalum is only known from two collections made in 1918 and recent searches made in the region have failed to located further specimens.

== Conservation status ==
Lasiopetalum cenobium is listed as "Priority One" by the Government of Western Australia Department of Biodiversity, Conservation and Attractions, meaning that it is known from only one or a few locations which are potentially at risk.
