= Lasiopetalum indutum =

Scientific classification
- Kingdom: Plantae
- Clade: Tracheophytes
- Clade: Angiosperms
- Clade: Eudicots
- Clade: Rosids
- Order: Malvales
- Family: Malvaceae
- Genus: Lasiopetalum
- Species: L. indutum

Binomial name
- Lasiopetalum indutum Steud.

Synonyms
- Lasiopetalum acutiflorum Turcz.; Lasiopetalum acutiflorum Turcz. var. acutiflorum

Species of shrub

Lasiopetalum indutum is a species of flowering plant in the family Malvaceae and is endemic to the south-west of Western Australia. It is an erect or straggling shrub with hairy stems and pink, cream-coloured or white flowers.

== Description ==
Lasiopetalum indutum is an erect or straggling shrub that typically grows to a height of 0.2–1 m (7.9 in – 3 ft 3.4 in) and has hairy stems. The leaves are 15–60 mm (0.59–2.36 in) long and 3–10 mm (0.12–0.39 in) wide covered with star-shaped hairs. The flowers are borne on pedicels 1.8–3 mm (0.071–0.118 in) long with bracteoles 3–8.2 mm (0.12–0.32 in) long near the base of the sepals. The sepals are pink, cream-coloured or white, 6.5–7.0 mm (0.26–0.28 in) long and joined for less than half their length. The petals are reduced to scales 0.5–0.6 mm (0.020–0.024 in) long. The anthers are dark red and 2–3 mm (0.079–0.118 in) long. Flowering occurs from May to December.

== Taxonomy ==
Lasiopetalum indutum was first formally described in 1845 by Ernst Gottlieb von Steudel in Johann Georg Christian Lehmann's Plantae Preissianae. The specific epithet (indutum) means "covered with a layer of hairs".

== Distribution and habitat ==
This lasiopetalum grows on sandplains, flats and hillslopes in the Esperance Plains, Jarrah Forest and Mallee biogeographic regions of south-western Western Australia.

== Conservation status ==
Lasiopetalum indutum is listed as "not threatened" by the Government of Western Australia Department of Biodiversity, Conservation and Attractions.
