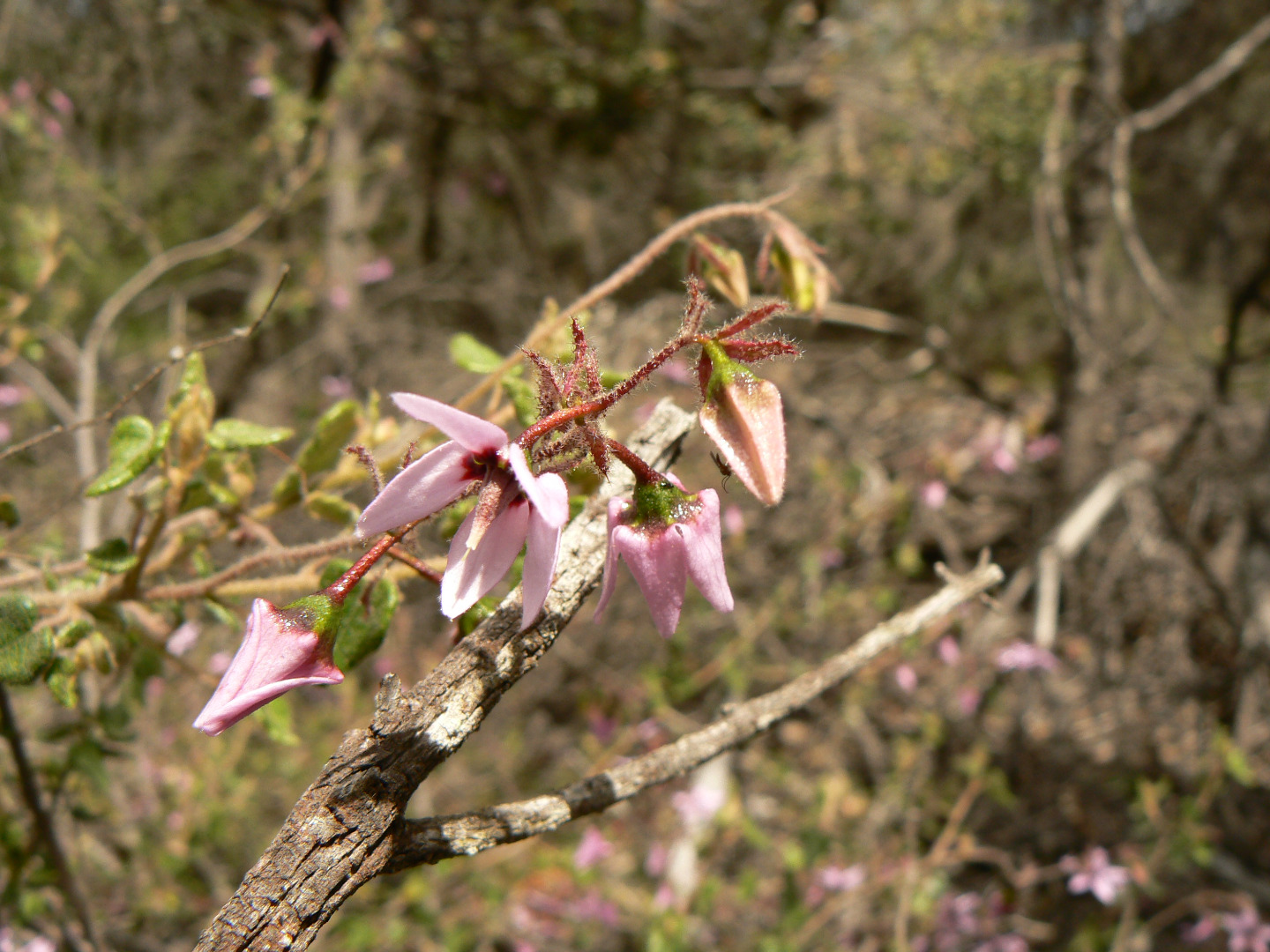

Conservation status
- Priority Two — Poorly Known Taxa (DEC)

Scientific classification
- Kingdom: Plantae
- Clade: Tracheophytes
- Clade: Angiosperms
- Clade: Eudicots
- Clade: Rosids
- Order: Malvales
- Family: Malvaceae
- Genus: Lasiopetalum
- Species: L. trichanthera

Binomial name
- Lasiopetalum trichanthera K.A.Sheph. & C.F.Wilkins

= Lasiopetalum trichanthera =

Species of plant

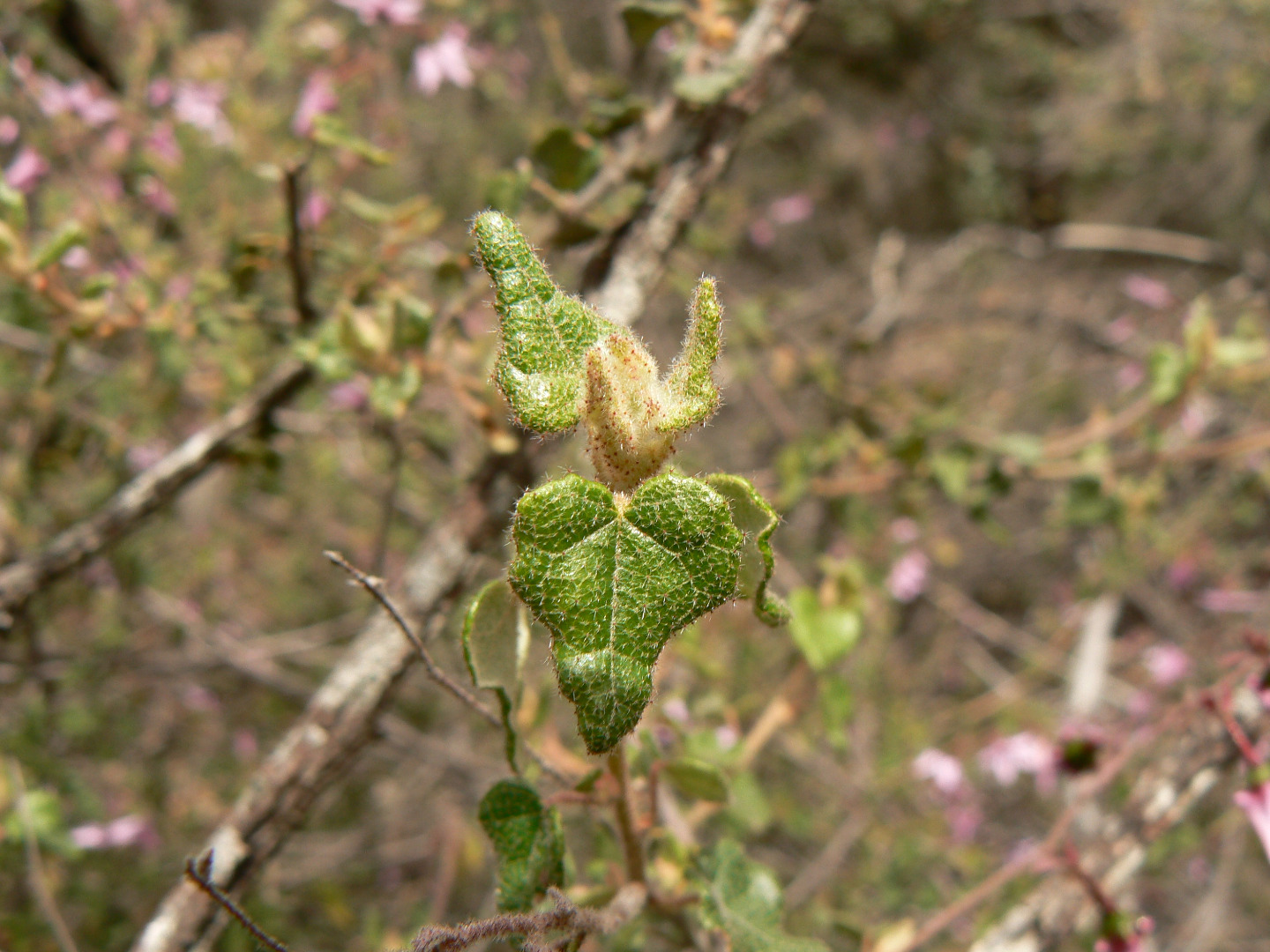
Leaves

Lasiopetalum trichanthera is a species of flowering plant in the family Malvaceae and is endemic to a restricted area in the south-west of Western Australia. It is an erect to straggling, sticky shrub with many hairy stems, egg-shaped leaves and bright pink and dark red flowers.

== Description ==
Lasiopetalum trichanthera is an erect to straggling, sticky shrub typically 0.8–1.2 m (3–4 ft) high and 0.8–1.5 m (3–5 ft) wide, its many stems covered with rust-coloured and white, star-shaped hairs, at least when young. The leaves are egg-shaped with a heart-shaped base, 35–80 mm (1.4–3.1 in) long and 4–15 mm (0.16–0.59 in) wide on a petiole 3.5–8 mm (0.14–0.31 in) long. The leaves are covered with white and rust-coloured, star-shaped hairs, densely so on the lower surface, but become glabrous with age. The flowers are arranged in loose groups of three to seven on a rusty-hairy peduncle 17–53.5 mm (0.67–2.11 in) long, each flower on a pedicel 2.3–8.3 mm (0.091–0.327 in) long with a narrowly egg-shaped bract 1.8–3.6 mm (0.071–0.142 in) long at the base. There are three bracteoles 3–6 mm (0.12–0.24 in) long at the base of the sepals. The sepals are bright pink with a dark red base, the lobes 5.7–7.2 mm (0.22–0.28 in) long, and hairy on the back. There are no petals, the anthers are densely hairy, dark red and 3.7–4.5 mm (0.15–0.18 in) long on filaments about 0.5–2.3 mm (0.020–0.091 in) long. Flowering has been recorded from October to February and the fruit is 4–6 mm (0.16–0.24 in) long and hairy.

== Taxonomy ==
Lasiopetalum trichanthera was first formally described in 2015 by Kelly Anne Shepherd and Carolyn F. Wilkins in the journal Nuytsia from specimens collected in Bobakine Nature Reserve in 2005. The specific epithet (trichanthera) means "hairy anthers".

== Distribution and habitat ==
This lasiopetalum is only known from two small populations in nature reserves near Northam, where it grows in woodland with a shrubby understorey.

== Conservation status ==
Lasiopetalum trichanthera is listed as "Priority Two" by the Western Australian Government Department of Biodiversity, Conservation and Attractions, meaning that it is poorly known and from only one or a few locations.
