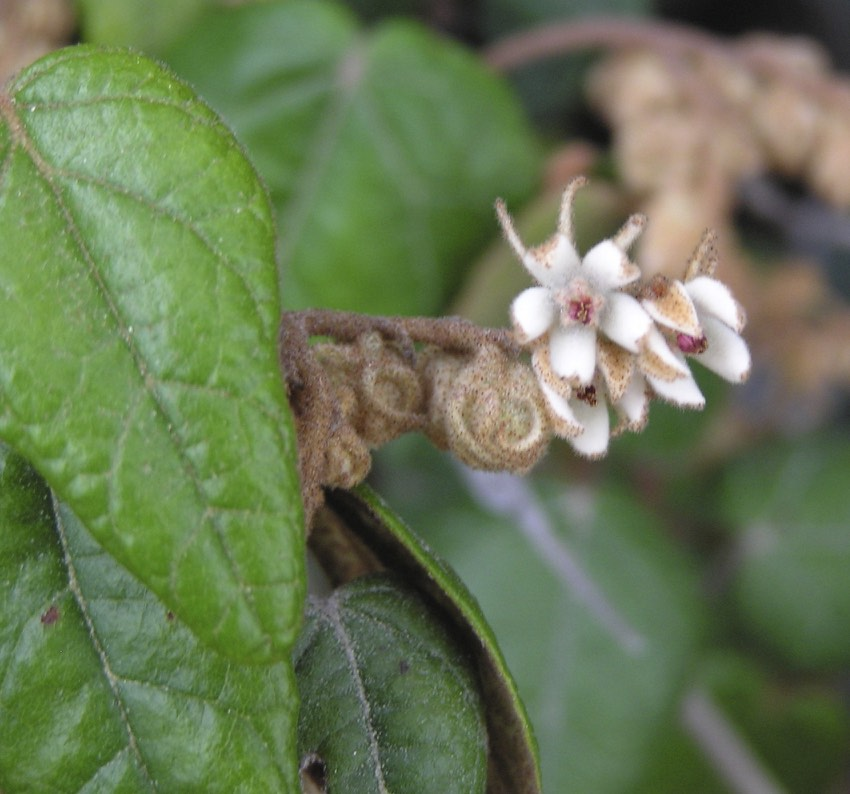
- In Cape Arid National Park

Scientific classification
- Kingdom: Plantae
- Clade: Tracheophytes
- Clade: Angiosperms
- Clade: Eudicots
- Clade: Rosids
- Order: Malvales
- Family: Malvaceae
- Genus: Lasiopetalum
- Species: L. quinquenervium

Binomial name
- Lasiopetalum quinquenervium Turcz.

Synonyms
- Lasiopetalum acutiflorum var. quinquenervium (Turcz.) Benth.

= Lasiopetalum quinquenervium =

Species of plant

Lasiopetalum quinquenervium is a species of flowering plant in the family Malvaceae and is endemic to the south of Western Australia. It is an erect, spreading shrub with hairy stems and leaves, egg-shaped leaves and pink or white flowers.

== Description ==
Lasiopetalum quinquenervium is an erect, spreading shrub that typically grows to a height of 0.25–1 m (1–3 ft), its stems and leaves covered with star-shaped hairs. The leaves are egg-shaped with a heart-shaped base, 30–70 mm (1.2–2.8 in) long and 10–45 mm (0.39–1.77 in) wide. The flowers are arranged in loose groups, each flower on a pedicel 1.5–5 mm (0.059–0.197 in) long with hairy bracteoles 6–9 mm (0.24–0.35 in) long at the base of the sepals. The sepals are pink or white, 6.0–7.5 mm (0.24–0.30 in) long, fused for half their length, and there are no petals. The anthers are 2.4–2.8 mm (0.094–0.110 in) long on filaments 1.4–2.0 mm (0.055–0.079 in) long. Flowering occurs from August to December.

== Taxonomy ==
Lasiopetalum quinquenervium was first formally described in 1852 by Nikolai Turczaninow in Bulletin de la Société Impériale des Naturalistes de Moscou from specimens collected by James Drummond. The specific epithet (quinquenervium) means "five-veined", referring to the leaves.

== Distribution and habitat ==
This lasiopetalum grows in rocky places on hillsides and in coastal areas between Jerramungup, Ravensthorpe and Esperance in the Esperance Plains and Mallee biogeographic regions of southern Western Australia.

== Conservation status ==
Lasiopetalum quinquenervium is listed as "not threatened" by the Western Australian Government Department of Biodiversity, Conservation and Attractions.
