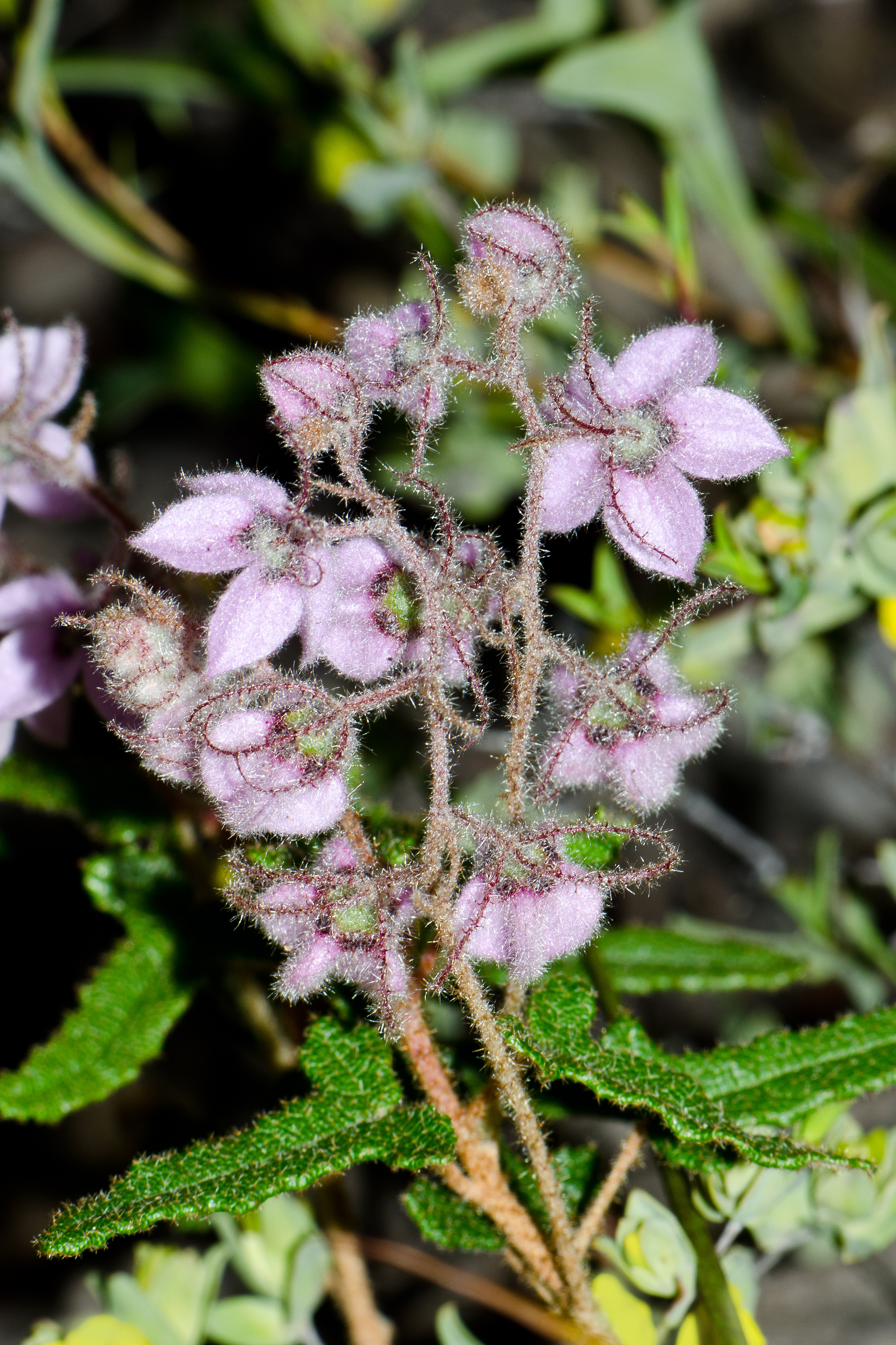

Conservation status
- Priority Three — Poorly Known Taxa (DEC)

Scientific classification
- Kingdom: Plantae
- Clade: Tracheophytes
- Clade: Angiosperms
- Clade: Eudicots
- Clade: Rosids
- Order: Malvales
- Family: Malvaceae
- Genus: Lasiopetalum
- Species: L. venustum

Binomial name
- Lasiopetalum venustum K.A.Sheph. & C.F.Wilkins

= Lasiopetalum venustum =

Species of plant

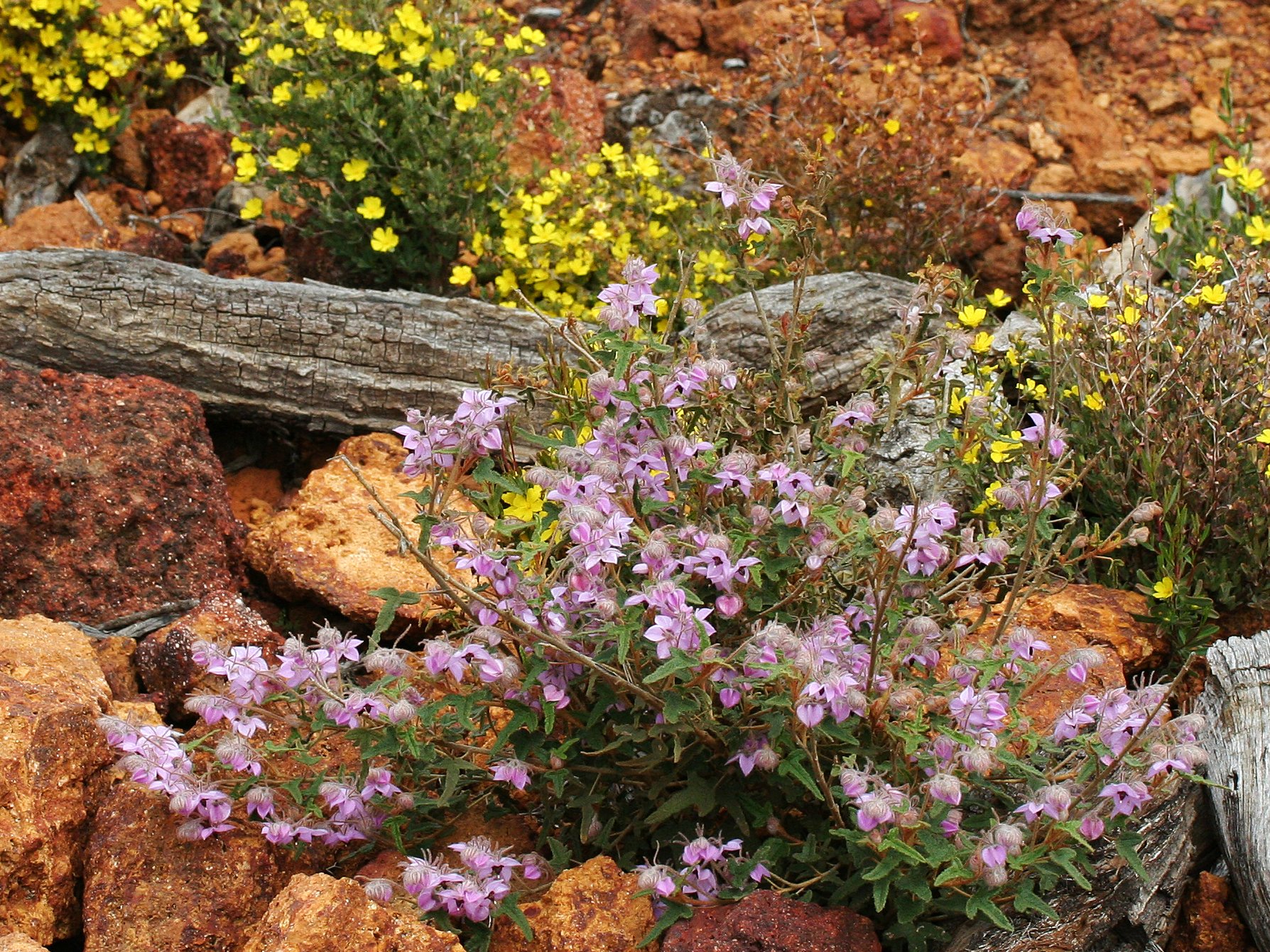
Habit

Lasiopetalum venustum is a species of flowering plant in the family Malvaceae and is endemic to a restricted area in the south-west of Western Australia. It is an erect shrub with hairy stems, egg-shaped, three-lobed leaves and pink and dark red flowers.

== Description ==
Lasiopetalum venustum is an erect shrub typically 0.8–1.5 m (3–5 ft) high and wide, its stems covered with rust-coloured and white, star-shaped hairs, at least when young. The leaves are egg-shaped with three lobes, 13–40 mm (0.51–1.57 in) long and 18–32 mm (0.71–1.26 in) wide on a petiole 4–22 mm (0.16–0.87 in) long. The leaves are covered with white and rust-coloured, star-shaped hairs, densely covered on the lower surface. The flowers are arranged in loose groups of four to twelve on a rusty-hairy peduncle 28–72 mm (1.1–2.8 in) long, each flower on a pedicel 4.5–9 mm (0.18–0.35 in) long with a thread-like bract 6–14 mm (0.24–0.55 in) long at the base. There are three thread-like bracteoles 6–12 mm (0.24–0.47 in) long at the base of the sepals. The sepals are bright pink with a dark red base, the lobes egg-shaped, 4–8.5 mm (0.16–0.33 in) long, and hairy on the back. There are no petals. The anthers are dark red with a white tip and 3.6–4.7 mm (0.14–0.19 in) long on filaments about 1 mm (0.039 in) long. Flowering has been recorded from October to January, and the fruit is about 3.5 mm (0.14 in) long and hairy.

== Taxonomy ==
Lasiopetalum venustum was first formally described in 2015 by Kelly Anne Shepherd and Carolyn F. Wilkins in the journal Nuytsia from specimens collected in Boonanarring Nature Reserve in 2002. The specific epithet (venustum) means "attractive, charming or pretty".

== Distribution and habitat ==
This lasiopetalum is only known from a nature reserve near Gingin, where it grows in woodland among granite boulders.

== Conservation status ==
Lasiopetalum venustum is listed as "Priority Three" by the Government of Western Australia Department of Biodiversity, Conservation and Attractions, meaning that it is poorly known and known from only a few locations but is not under imminent threat.
