= Lasiopetalum adenotrichum =

Conservation status
- Priority Two — Poorly Known Taxa (DEC)

Scientific classification
- Kingdom: Plantae
- Clade: Tracheophytes
- Clade: Angiosperms
- Clade: Eudicots
- Clade: Rosids
- Order: Malvales
- Family: Malvaceae
- Genus: Lasiopetalum
- Species: L. adenotrichum

Binomial name
- Lasiopetalum adenotrichum R.A.Meissn. & Rathbone

Species of plant

Lasiopetalum adenotrichum is a species of flowering plant in the family Malvaceae and is endemic to the Fitzgerald River National Park in the south of Western Australia. It is an erect shrub with hairy foliage, narrow egg-shaped to lance-shaped leaves and groups of white to cream-coloured and dark reddish-purple flowers.

== Description ==
Lasiopetalum adenotrichum is an erect shrub typically 25–50 cm (9.8–19.7 in) high and 25–100 cm (9.8–39.4 in) wide, its stems covered with rust-coloured, star-shaped hairs. The leaves are narrow egg-shaped to lance-shaped, mostly 12–48 mm (0.47–1.89 in) long and 5–24 mm (0.20–0.94 in) wide on a petiole 5–20 mm (0.20–0.79 in) long. The upper surface of the leaves has scattered, rust-coloured, star-shaped hairs and the lower surface is densely covered with mostly white star-shaped hairs. The flowers are arranged in groups of mostly four to seven on a hairy peduncle 6–12 mm (0.24–0.47 in) long, each flower on a pedicel up to 1.5 mm (0.059 in) long with a bract at the base. There are three further bracts mostly 3.1–7.5 mm (0.12–0.30 in) long at the base of the sepals, the sepals white to cream-coloured and hairy, with lobes 4.6–7.1 mm (0.18–0.28 in) long. The five petals are more or less round, dark reddish-purple, 0.7–1.1 mm (0.028–0.043 in) long and glabrous. Flowering occurs from September to November and the fruit is a densely hairy capsule 4.1–4.5 mm (0.16–0.18 in) long.

== Taxonomy ==
Lasiopetalum adenotrichum was first formally described in 2014 by Rachel A. Meissner and Damien A. Rathbone in the journal Nuytsia from specimens collected by Rathbone in the Fitzgerald River National Park in 2012. The specific epithet (adenotrichum) means "gland-hair", referring to the hairs on the foliage.

== Distribution and habitat ==
This lasiopetalum is only known from scattered populations in the Fitzgerald River National Park where it grows in low heath.

== Conservation status ==
Lasiopetalum adenotrichum is listed as "Priority Two" by the Western Australian Government Department of Biodiversity, Conservation and Attractions, meaning that it is poorly known and from only one or a few locations.
