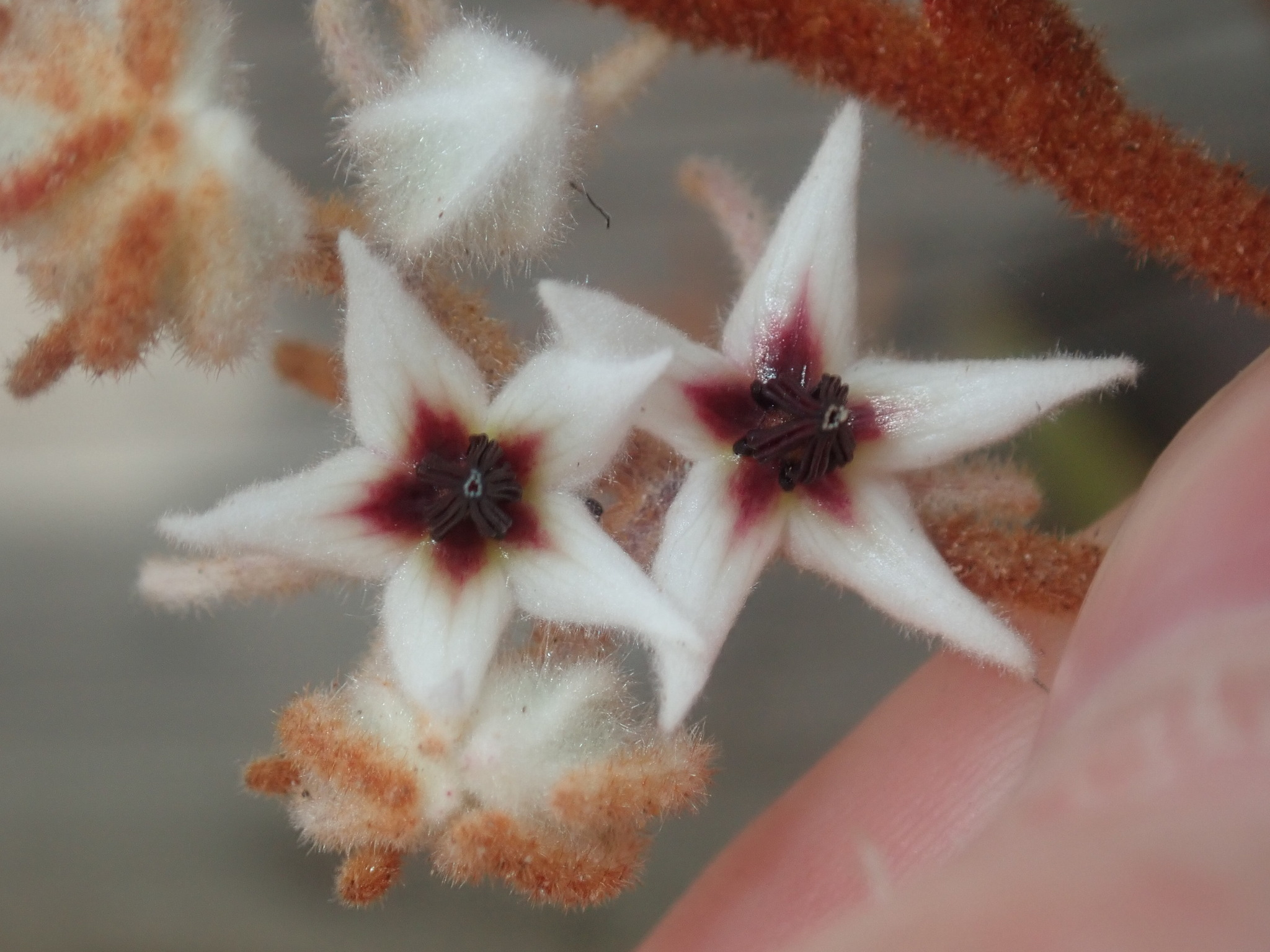

Conservation status
- Priority Three — Poorly Known Taxa (DEC)

Scientific classification
- Kingdom: Plantae
- Clade: Tracheophytes
- Clade: Angiosperms
- Clade: Eudicots
- Clade: Rosids
- Order: Malvales
- Family: Malvaceae
- Genus: Lasiopetalum
- Species: L. monticola

Binomial name
- Lasiopetalum monticola Paust

= Lasiopetalum monticola =

Species of shrub

Lasiopetalum monticola is a species of flowering plant in the family Malvaceae and is endemic to the south-west of Western Australia. It is an erect, slender or straggling shrub with densely hairy branchlets, leaves and flowers, egg-shaped leaves and pink, cream-coloured or white flowers.

== Description ==
Lasiopetalum monticola is an erect, slender or straggling shrub that typically grows to a height of 0.45–1.5 m (1 ft 6 in – 4 ft 11 in), its branches, leaves and flowers densely covered with white or rust-coloured, star-shaped hairs. The leaves are egg-shaped, 15–80 mm (0.59–3.15 in) long and 5–40 mm (0.20–1.57 in) wide on a petiole 10–20 mm (0.39–0.79 in) long. The flowers are borne in racemes of three to fifteen 40–110 mm (1.6–4.3 in) long, each raceme on a peduncle 30–60 mm (1.2–2.4 in) long, each flower on a pedicel 4–5 mm (0.16–0.20 in) long with linear bracts about 5 mm (0.20 in) long at the base and three bracteoles 0.5–1.2 mm (0.020–0.047 in) long below the base of the sepals. The sepals are pink, cream-coloured or white, narrowly egg-shaped and 5.6–6.3 mm (0.22–0.25 in) long. The petals are oblong, about 0.5 mm (0.020 in) long, the anthers more or less sessile. Flowering occurs from August to October.

== Taxonomy ==
Lasiopetalum monticola was first formally described in 1974 by Susan Paust in the journal Nuytsia from specimens collected from Ellen Peak in the Stirling Range by Alexander Morrison in 1902. The specific epithet (monticola) means "a dweller in mountains".

== Distribution and habitat ==
This lasiopetalum grows on steep slopes and gullies on rocky soil in the Stirling Range and on East Mount Barren in the Esperance Plains and Mallee biogeographic regions of south-western Western Australia.

== Conservation status ==
Lasiopetalum monticola is listed as "Priority Three" by the Government of Western Australia Department of Biodiversity, Conservation and Attractions, meaning that it is poorly known and known from only a few locations but is not under imminent threat.
