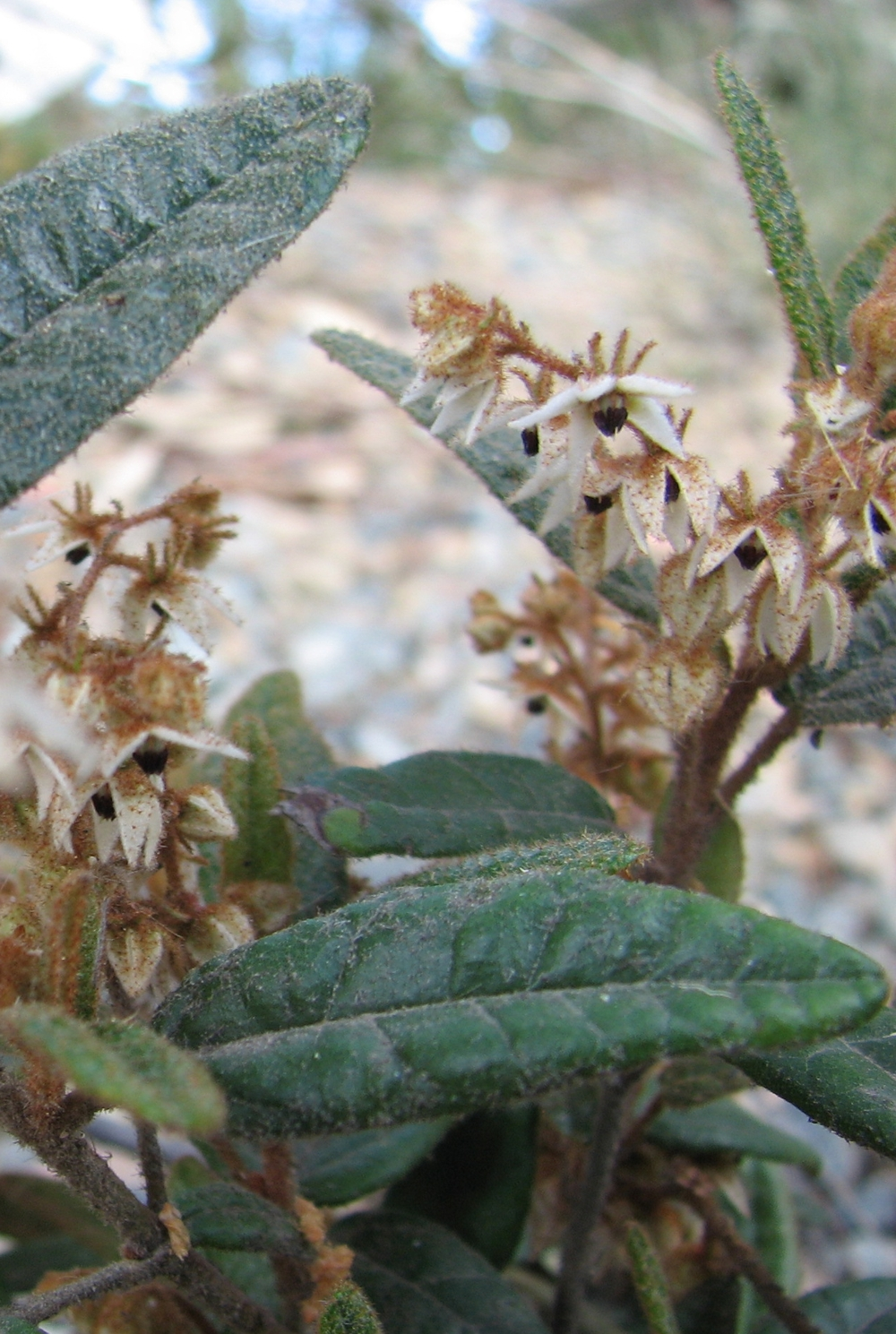
- In Maranoa Gardens

Conservation status
- Priority Two — Poorly Known Taxa (DEC)

Scientific classification
- Kingdom: Plantae
- Clade: Tracheophytes
- Clade: Angiosperms
- Clade: Eudicots
- Clade: Rosids
- Order: Malvales
- Family: Malvaceae
- Genus: Lasiopetalum
- Species: L. maxwellii

Binomial name
- Lasiopetalum maxwellii F.Muell.

= Lasiopetalum maxwellii =

Species of shrub

Lasiopetalum maxwellii is a species of flowering plant in the family Malvaceae and is endemic to the south coast Western Australia. It is a sprawling shrub with hairy young stems, lance-shaped to oblong leaves and white to cream-coloured flowers.

== Description ==
Lasiopetalum maxwellii is a sprawling shrub that typically grows to a height of 25–60 cm (9.8–23.6 in) and has hairy stems. The leaves are lance-shaped to oblong, 30–80 mm (1.2–3.1 in) long and 7–25 mm (0.28–0.98 in) wide and covered with star-shaped hairs. The flowers are borne in loose groups, each flower on a pedicel 1.2–3.0 mm (0.047–0.118 in) long with bracteoles 2–3 mm (0.079–0.118 in) long below the base of the sepals. The sepals are cream-coloured or white, 5–6 mm (0.20–0.24 in) long and the petals reduced to small scales or absent. The anthers are 1.4–2.0 mm (0.055–0.079 in) long on a filament 0.5–0.7 mm (0.020–0.028 in) long. Flowering mainly occurs from September to January.

== Taxonomy ==
Lasiopetalum maxwellii was first formally described in 1881 by Ferdinand von Mueller in his Fragmenta Phytographiae Australiae from specimens collected by George Maxwell. The specific epithet (maxwellii) honours the collector of the type specimens.

== Distribution and habitat ==
This lasiopetalum grows on sandy soils of granitic slopes in near-coastal areas of the Esperance Plains biogeographic area of southern Western Australia.
