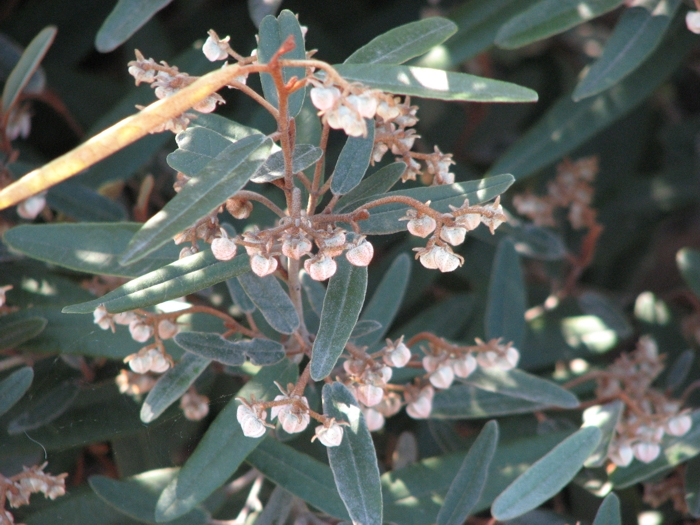
- Lasiopetalum behrii

Scientific classification
- Kingdom: Plantae
- Clade: Tracheophytes
- Clade: Angiosperms
- Clade: Eudicots
- Clade: Rosids
- Order: Malvales
- Family: Malvaceae
- Tribe: Lasiopetaleae
- Genus: Lasiopetalum; Sm.

Species
- See text.

= Lasiopetalum =

Genus of flowering plants

Lasiopetalum, commonly known as velvet bushes, is a genus of about forty-five species of flowering plants in the family Malvaceae, all endemic to Australia.

== Description ==
Most species of Lasiopetalum are spreading or prostrate, many-branched shrubs. Commonly known as velvet bushes, they derive their common name from the pubescent (finely-furred) nature of the stems, leaves and flowers. Their leaves are generally arranged alternately on the stems. The flowerheads are either axillary or terminal. The flowers are small, the five-lobed calyces are hairy and the petals tiny.

The genus is allied to the genera Guichenotia and Thomasia. The greatest diversity of species is in Western Australia, where 24 species are found, of which 8 are endemic to the region.

== Taxonomy ==
The genus Lasiopetalum was first formally described in 1798 by James Edward Smith in Transactions of the Linnean Society of London. The genus name is derived from the Ancient Greek word lasios "hairy", and the Botanical Greek petalon "petal", and refers to the hairy calyx. Lasiopetalum was previously classified in the family Sterculiaceae, however that family has been sunk into an expanded Malvaceae. Within the family, it gives its name to its tribe Lasiopetaleae, which contains about ten genera, located mostly in Australia. It is closely related to Guichenotia, although the exact relationship and genus delineation is unclear pending further research.

== Distribution and habitat ==
Species occur in lowland sclerophyll forest and heathland habitats and are endemic to Australia.

== Use in horticulture ==
The genus is rarely cultivated, although many species have flushes of attractive reddish hairy new growth, and several were cultivated in England in the 19th century.

== Species list ==
The following is a list of Lasiopetalum species, accepted by the Australian Plant Census as at December 2020:

- Lasiopetalum adenotrichum R.A.Meissn. & Rathbone (W.A.)
- Lasiopetalum angustifolium W.Fitzg. - narrow-leaved lasiopetalum (W.A.)
- Lasiopetalum baueri Steetz - slender velvet bush (N.S.W., Vic., S.A., Tas.)
- Lasiopetalum behrii F.Muell. - pink velvet-bush (N.S.W., Vic., S.A., W.A.)
- Lasiopetalum bracteatum (Endl.) Benth. - Helena velvet bush (W.A.)
- Lasiopetalum cardiophyllum Paust (W.A.)
- Lasiopetalum cenobium K.A.Sheph. & C.F.Wilkins (W.A.)
- Lasiopetalum compactum Paust (W.A.)
- Lasiopetalum cordifolium Endl. (W.A.)
- Lasiopetalum dielsii E.Pritz. (W.A.)
- Lasiopetalum discolor Hook. – coast velvet bush (W.A., S.A., Tas.)
- Lasiopetalum drummondii Benth. (W.A.)
- Lasiopetalum ferraricollinum E.M.Benn. & K.A.Sheph. (W.A.)
- Lasiopetalum ferrugineum Sm. – rusty velvet-bush (Qld., N.S.W., Vic.)
- Lasiopetalum fitzgibbonii F.Muell. (W.A.)
- Lasiopetalum floribundum Benth. - free-flowering lasiopetalum (W.A.)
- Lasiopetalum glabratum Paust (W.A.)
- Lasiopetalum glutinosum (Lindl.) F.Muell. (W.A.)
- Lasiopetalum indutum Steud. (W.A.)
- Lasiopetalum joyceae Blakely (N.S.W.)
- Lasiopetalum laxiflorum (Benth.) F.Muell. (W.A.)
- Lasiopetalum lineare Paust (W.A.)
- Lasiopetalum longistamineum Maiden & Betche (N.S.W.)
- Lasiopetalum macrophyllum Graham - shrubby velvet bush (N.S.W., Vic., Tas.)
- Lasiopetalum maxwellii F.Muell. (W.A.)
- Lasiopetalum membranaceum (Steud.) Benth. (W.A.)
- Lasiopetalum micranthum Hook.f. – Tasmanian velvetbush (Tas.)
- Lasiopetalum microcardium E.Pritz. (W.A.)
- Lasiopetalum molle Benth. - soft-leaved lasiopetalum (W.A.)
- Lasiopetalum monticola Paust (W.A.)
- Lasiopetalum ogilvieanum F.Muell. (W.A.)
- Lasiopetalum oldfieldii F.Muell. (W.A.)
- Lasiopetalum oppositifolium F.Muell. (W.A.)
- Lasiopetalum parviflorum Rudge (N.S.W., Qld.)
- Lasiopetalum parvuliflorum F.Muell. (W.A.)
- Lasiopetalum pterocarpum E.M.Benn. & K.A.Sheph. – wing-fruited lasiopetalum (W.A.)
- Lasiopetalum quinquenervium Turcz. (W.A.)
- Lasiopetalum rosmarinifolium (Turcz.) Benth. (W.A.)
- Lasiopetalum rotundifolium Paust (W.A.)
- Lasiopetalum rufum R.Br. ex Benth. (N.S.W.)
- Lasiopetalum schulzenii (F.Muell.) Benth. – drooping velvet-bush (S.A., Vic.)
- Lasiopetalum x tepperi F.Muell. (S.A.)
- Lasiopetalum trichanthera K.A.Sheph. & C.F.Wilkins (W.A.)
- Lasiopetalum venustum K.A.Sheph. & C.F.Wilkins (W.A.)
