= Lasiopetalum cardiophyllum =

Conservation status
- Priority Four — Rare Taxa (DEC)

Scientific classification
- Kingdom: Plantae
- Clade: Tracheophytes
- Clade: Angiosperms
- Clade: Eudicots
- Clade: Rosids
- Order: Malvales
- Family: Malvaceae
- Genus: Lasiopetalum
- Species: L. cardiophyllum

Binomial name
- Lasiopetalum cardiophyllum Paust

Species of plant

Lasiopetalum cardiophyllum, is a species of flowering plant in the family Malvaceae and is endemic to the south-west of Western Australia. It is an erect shrub with egg-shaped to heart-shaped leaves and groups of pinkish flowers.

== Description ==
Lasiopetalum cardiophyllum is an erect shrub with many stems, that typically grows to a height of 20–50 cm (7.9–19.7 in), its young stems covered with star-shaped hairs. The leaves are broadly egg-shaped to heart-shaped or triangular, 10–30 mm (0.39–1.18 in) long and 6–30 mm (0.24–1.18 in) wide on a hairy petiole 3–6 mm (0.12–0.24 in) long. The upper surfaces of the leaves is more or less glabrous and the lower surface is covered with woolly, grey, star-shaped hairs. The flowers are arranged in groups of three to six 30–50 mm (1.2–2.0 in) long, the peduncle 20–30 mm (0.79–1.18 in) long, each flower on a pedicel about 8 mm (0.31 in) long with linear bracts about 2 mm (0.079 in) long at the base and a linear bracteole about 2 mm (0.079 in) long at the base of the sepals. The sepals are pink with a dark red base, about 5 mm (0.20 in) long with five egg-shaped lobes 3.7–7.1 mm (0.15–0.28 in) long and there are no petals. Flowering mostly occurs from August to December.

== Taxonomy ==
Lasiopetalum cardiophyllum was first formally described in 1974 by Susan Paust in the journal Nuytsia from specimens collected by Alexander Morrison on Mount Saddleback in 1904. The specific epithet (cardiophyllum) means "heart-leaved".

== Distribution and habitat ==
This lasiopetalum grows on flats and hillslopes between North Bannister and Mount Saddleback in the Avon Wheatbelt and Jarrah Forest biogeographic regions of south-western Western Australia.

== Conservation status ==
Lasiopetalum cardiophyllum is listed as "Priority Four" by the Government of Western Australia Department of Biodiversity, Conservation and Attractions, meaning that is rare or near threatened.
