= Lasiopetalum joyceae =

Conservation status
- Vulnerable (EPBC Act)

Scientific classification
- Kingdom: Plantae
- Clade: Tracheophytes
- Clade: Angiosperms
- Clade: Eudicots
- Clade: Rosids
- Order: Malvales
- Family: Malvaceae
- Genus: Lasiopetalum
- Species: L. joyceae

Binomial name
- Lasiopetalum joyceae Blakely

Species of shrub

Lasiopetalum joyceae is a species of flowering plant in the family Malvaceae and is endemic to New South Wales. It is an erect shrub with linear leaves and small groups of pinkish to reddish-brown flowers.

== Description ==
Lasiopetalum joyceae is an erect shrub that typically grows to a height of up to 2 m (6 ft 7 in) and has wand-like branches. The leaves are linear, 30–90 mm (1.2–3.5 in) long and less than 10 mm (0.39 in) wide with the edges rolled under, and whitish to rust-coloured hairs on the lower surface. The flowers are arranged in clusters of three of four with bracteoles 5–8 mm (0.20–0.31 in) long and about 1 mm (0.039 in) wide near the base of the sepals. The sepals are pinkish to reddish-brown with woolly hairs on the back, and there are no petals. Flowering occurs in spring.

== Taxonomy ==
Lasiopetalum joyceae was first formally described in 1929 by William Blakely in the Proceedings of the Linnean Society of New South Wales. The specific epithet (joyceae) honours "my late adopted daughter, Joyce, who was the first to bring this beautiful species under my notice".

== Distribution and habitat ==
This lasiopetalum grows in heath on ridgetops on the Hornsby Plateau south of the Hawkesbury River, in the Sydney region of New South Wales.

== Conservation status ==
Lasiopetalum joyceae is listed as "vulnerable" under the Australian Government Environment Protection and Biodiversity Conservation Act 1999 and the New South Wales Government Biodiversity Conservation Act 2016.
