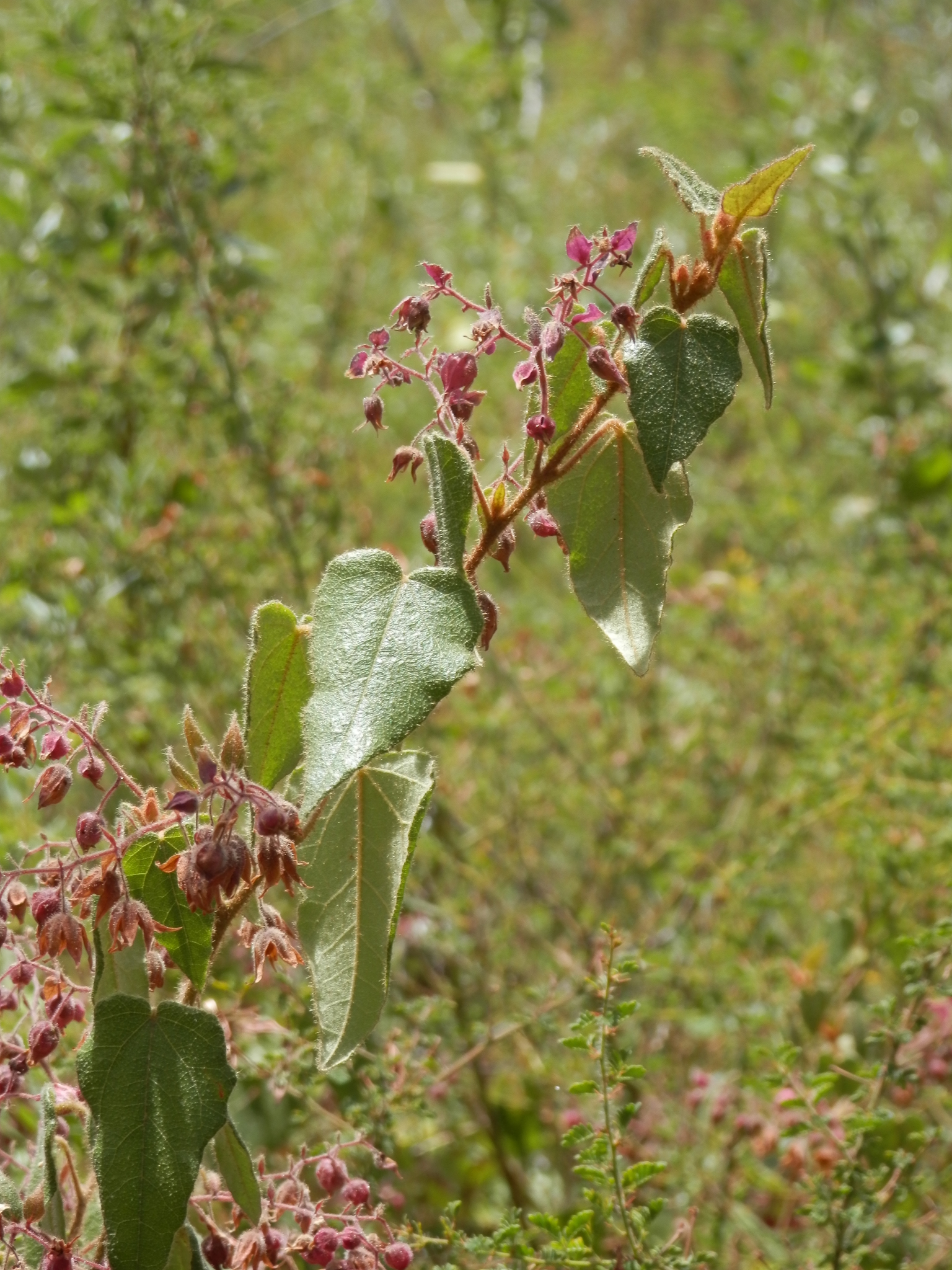
- Lasiopetalum bracteatum near Perth

Conservation status
- Priority Four — Rare Taxa (DEC)

Scientific classification
- Kingdom: Plantae
- Clade: Tracheophytes
- Clade: Angiosperms
- Clade: Eudicots
- Clade: Rosids
- Order: Malvales
- Family: Malvaceae
- Genus: Lasiopetalum
- Species: L. bracteatum

Binomial name
- Lasiopetalum bracteatum (Endl.) Benth.

= Lasiopetalum bracteatum =

Helena velvet bush

Species of plant

Lasiopetalum bracteatum, commonly known as Helena velvet bush, is a species of flowering plant in the family Malvaceae and is endemic to the south-west Western Australia. It is an erect, spreading shrub with egg-shaped leaves and loose groups pinkish flowers.

== Description ==
Lasiopetalum bracteatum is an erect, spreading shrub typically 60–150 cm (24–59 in) high and 40–100 cm (16–39 in) wide, its young stems covered with star-shaped hairs. The leaves are egg-shaped, the edges curved downwards, mostly 19–45 mm (0.75–1.77 in) long and 11–30 mm (0.43–1.18 in) wide on a petiole 6–13 mm (0.24–0.51 in) long. The surfaces of the leaves are sparsely to densely covered with star-shaped hairs. The flowers are arranged in loose groups of 8 to 22 46–80 mm (1.8–3.1 in) long, the peduncle hairy and 10–37 mm (0.39–1.46 in) long, each flower on a pedicel 4.1–7.0 mm (0.16–0.28 in) long with an elliptic bract 2.3–7.2 mm (0.091–0.283 in) long at the base. The sepals are bright pink to mauve-pink with a dark red base, 4.8–8.3 mm (0.19–0.33 in) long with lobes 3.7–7.1 mm (0.15–0.28 in) long and the five petals are about 1 mm (0.039 in) long and glabrous. Flowering occurs from August to November and the fruit is an elliptic capsule 4.1–4.5 mm (0.16–0.18 in) long.

== Taxonomy ==
This species was first formally described in 1839 by Stephan Endlicher who gave it the name Corethrostylis bracteata in Novarum Stirpium Decades. In 1863, George Bentham changed the name to Lasiopetalum bracteatum in Flora Australiensis. The specific epithet (bracteatum) means "bracteate".

== Distribution and habitat ==
This lasiopetalum grows near creeks and drainage lines and near granite outcrops in the Jarrah Forest and Swan Coastal Plain biogeographic regions of south-western Western Australia.

== Conservation status ==
Lasiopetalum bracteatum is listed as "Priority Four" by the Government of Western Australia Department of Biodiversity, Conservation and Attractions, meaning that is rare or near threatened.
