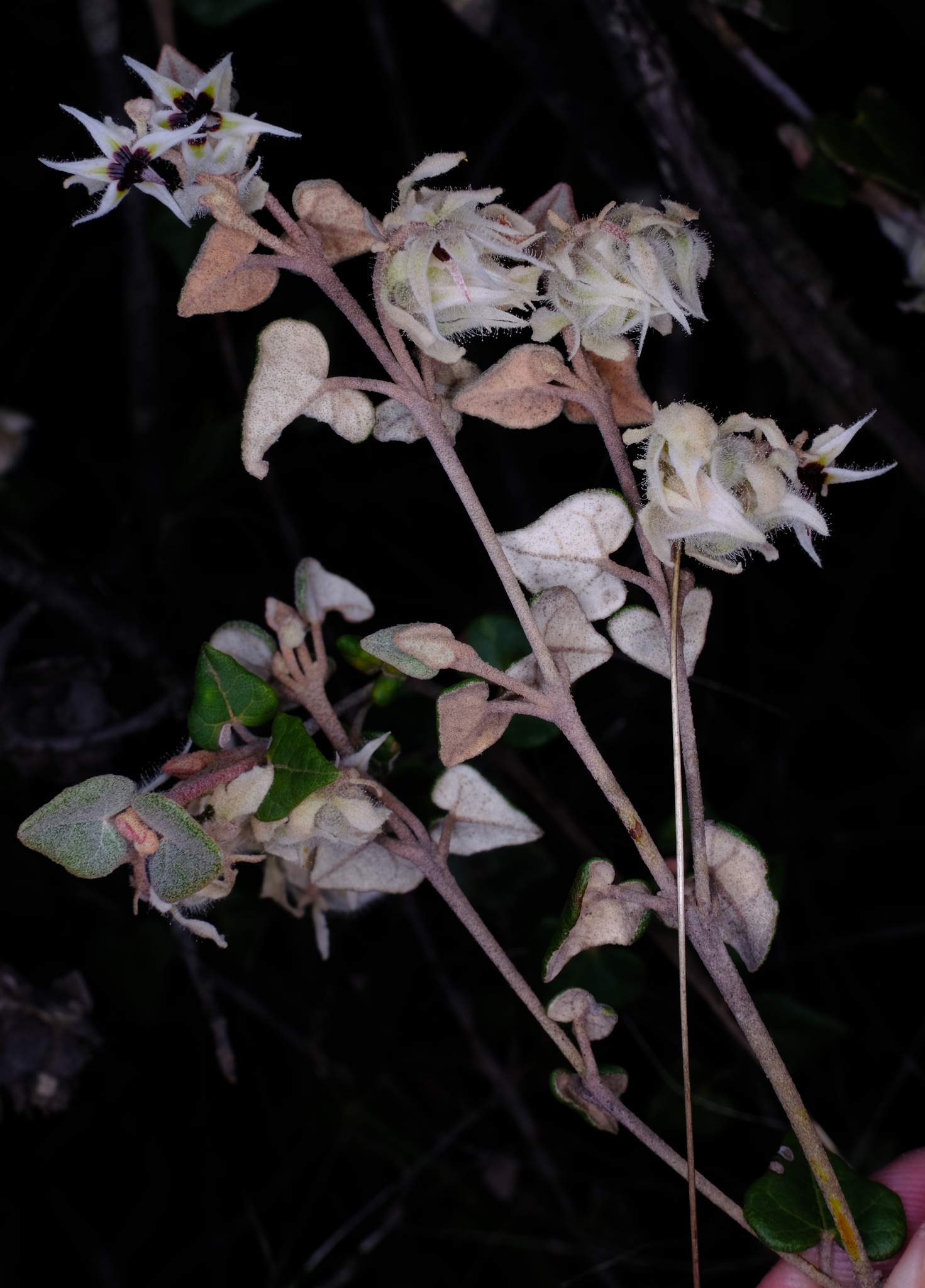

Scientific classification
- Kingdom: Plantae
- Clade: Tracheophytes
- Clade: Angiosperms
- Clade: Eudicots
- Clade: Rosids
- Order: Malvales
- Family: Malvaceae
- Genus: Lasiopetalum
- Species: L. microcardium

Binomial name
- Lasiopetalum microcardium E.Pritz.

= Lasiopetalum microcardium =

Species of shrub

Lasiopetalum microcardium is a species of flowering plant in the family Malvaceae and is endemic to the south-west of Western Australia. It is a low, spreading or straggling shrub with hairy stems, heart-shaped leaves and blue, purple or white flowers.

== Description ==
Lasiopetalum microcardium is a low, spreading or straggling shrub that typically grows to a height of 20–70 cm (7.9–27.6 in) and has hairy stems. The leaves are heart-shaped, 8–20 mm (0.31–0.79 in) long and 5–15 mm (0.20–0.59 in) wide. The flowers are borne on a pedicel 4–6 mm (0.16–0.24 in) long with bracteoles 4.0–4.8 mm (0.16–0.19 in) long below the base of the sepals. The sepals are petal-like, blue, pink or white, 7.0–8.5 mm (0.28–0.33 in) long and joined near the base. There are no petals and the anthers are 2.0–2.3 mm (0.079–0.091 in) long on a filament 0.3–1.2 mm (0.012–0.047 in) long. Flowering occurs from August to December.

== Taxonomy ==
Lasiopetalum microcardium was first formally described in 1904 by Ernst Georg Pritzel in Engler's journal Botanische Jahrbücher für Systematik, Pflanzengeschichte und Pflanzengeographie. The specific epithet (microcardium) means "a small heart" referring to the size and shape of the leaves.

== Distribution and habitat ==
This lasiopetalum grows in lateritic soils on ridges and breakaways in the Avon Wheatbelt, Esperance Plains, Jarrah Forest and Mallee biogeographic regions of south-western Western Australia.

== Conservation status ==
Lasiopetalum microcardium is listed as "not threatened" by the Government of Western Australia Department of Biodiversity, Conservation and Attractions.
