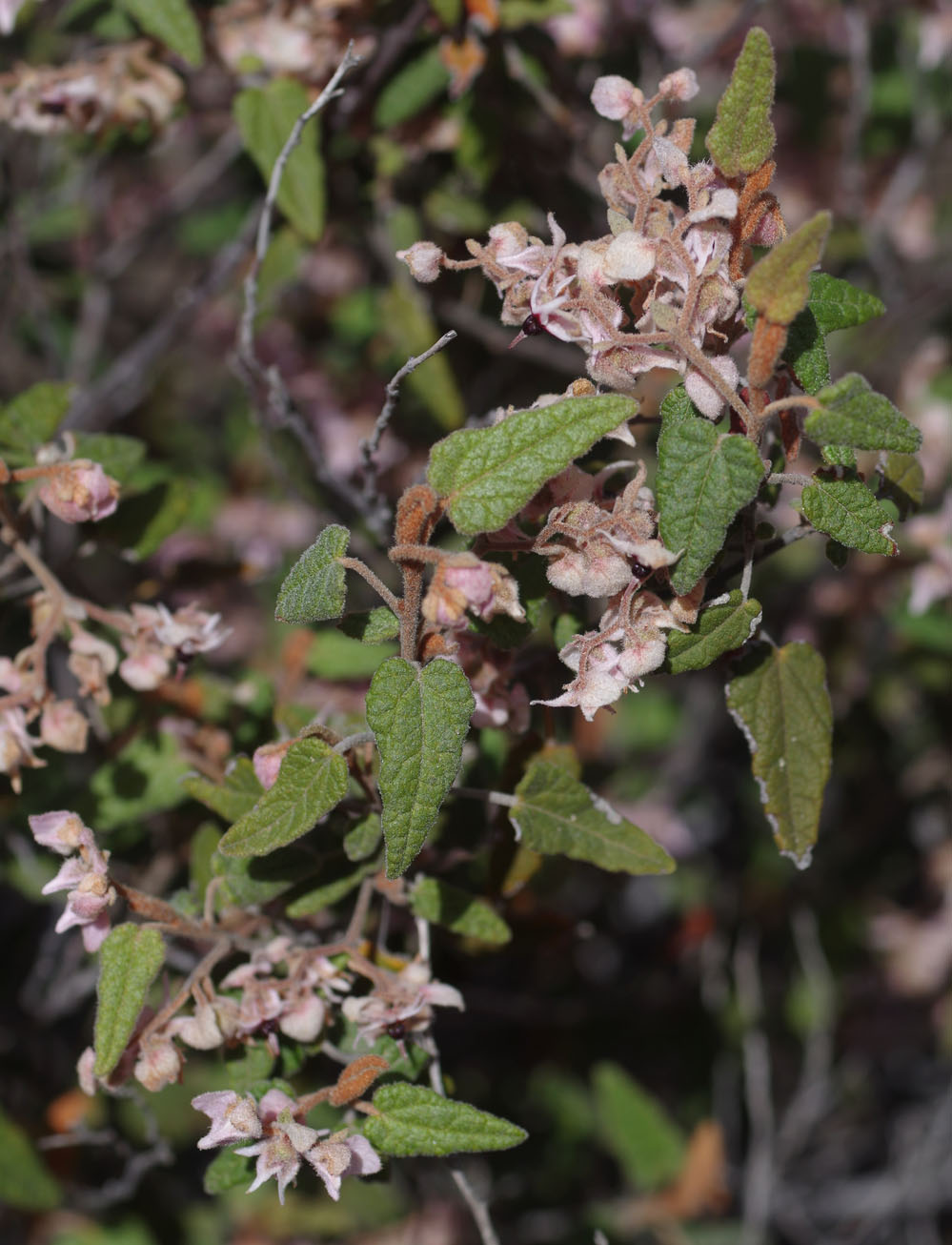
- In Wongan Hills

Scientific classification
- Kingdom: Plantae
- Clade: Tracheophytes
- Clade: Angiosperms
- Clade: Eudicots
- Clade: Rosids
- Order: Malvales
- Family: Malvaceae
- Genus: Lasiopetalum
- Species: L. molle

Binomial name
- Lasiopetalum molle Benth.

= Lasiopetalum molle =

Species of shrub

Lasiopetalum molle, commonly known as soft leaved lasiopetalum, is a species of flowering plant in the family Malvaceae and is endemic to the south-west of Western Australia. It is an erect or spreading subshrub or shrub with hairy stems, thick and stiff egg-shaped leaves and pink flowers.

== Description ==
Lasiopetalum molle is an erect or spreading subshrub or shrub that typically grows to a height of 0.3–1.5 cm (0.12–0.59 in), its young stems densely woolly-hairy with star-shaped hairs. The leaves are egg-shaped, mostly 14–24.3 mm (0.55–0.96 in) long and 6.7–12 mm (0.26–0.47 in) wide on a petiole 3.8–82 mm (0.15–3.23 in) long. The flowers are borne in dense clusters of nine to eleven flowers on a hairy peduncle 8–14.3 mm (0.31–0.56 in) long, the individual flowers on pedicels 1.8–5.3 mm (0.071–0.209 in) long with egg-shaped bracts 1.2–2.7 mm (0.047–0.106 in) long at the base. There are also pinkish, egg-shaped bracteoles 4.5–6.6 mm (0.18–0.26 in) long below the base of the sepals. The sepals are pink and petal-like, 5.8–7.5 mm (0.23–0.30 in) long and joined near the base, the lobes 4.8–6.5 mm (0.19–0.26 in) long. There are no petals and the anthers are 1.7–2.0 mm (0.067–0.079 in) long on a filament 0.5–0.8 mm (0.020–0.031 in) long. Flowering occurs from July to October.

== Taxonomy ==
Lasiopetalum molle was first formally described in 1863 by George Bentham in Flora Australiensis from specimens collected by James Drummond in the Swan River Colony. The specific epithet (molle) means "soft".

== Distribution and habitat ==
This lasiopetalum grows in open mallee woodland from Wongan Hills to Newdegate in the Avon Wheatbelt and Mallee biogeographic regions of south-western Western Australia.

== Conservation status ==
Lasiopetalum molle is listed as "not threatened" by the Government of Western Australia Department of Biodiversity, Conservation and Attractions.
