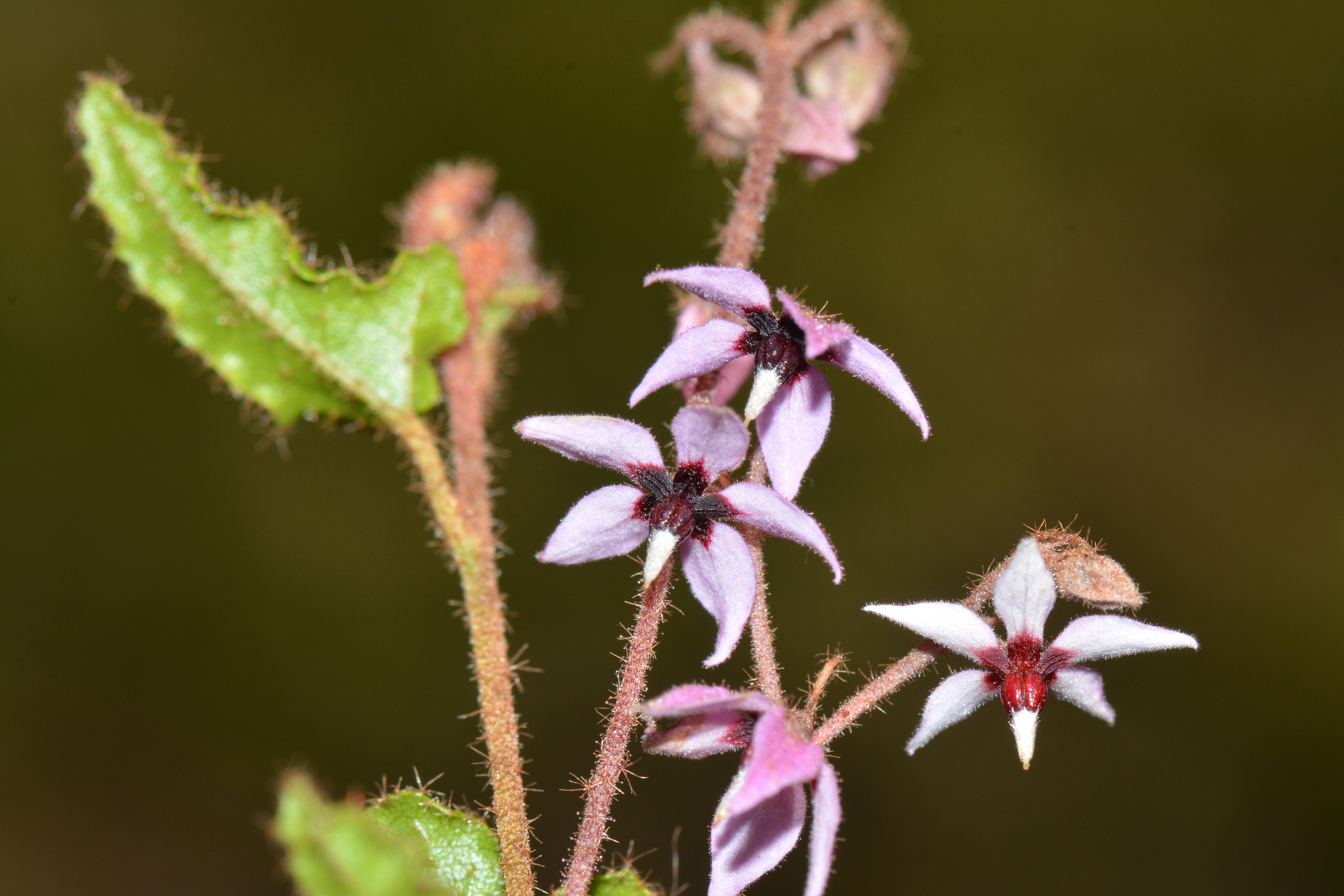

Scientific classification
- Kingdom: Plantae
- Clade: Tracheophytes
- Clade: Angiosperms
- Clade: Eudicots
- Clade: Rosids
- Order: Malvales
- Family: Malvaceae
- Genus: Lasiopetalum
- Species: L. glabratum

Binomial name
- Lasiopetalum glabratum Paust

= Lasiopetalum glabratum =

Species of shrub

Lasiopetalum glabratum is a species of flowering plant in the family Malvaceae and is endemic to the south-west of Western Australia. It is an erect shrub with densely hairy young stems, egg-shaped leaves and pale mauve-pink reddish-purple flowers.

== Description ==
Lasiopetalum glabratum is an erect shrub that typically grows to a height of up to 50 cm (20 in), its young stems covered with tan or dark red, star-shaped hairs. The leaves are mostly glabrous, egg-shaped, mostly 25–58 mm (0.98–2.28 in) long and 13–43 mm (0.51–1.69 in) wide on a petiole 14–40 mm (0.55–1.57 in) long. The flowers are borne in loose groups of three to six 36–72 mm (1.4–2.8 in) long, each group on a peduncle 19–42 mm (0.75–1.65 in) long, each flower on a pedicel 2.3–4.8 mm (0.091–0.189 in) long with linear to narrowly egg-shaped bracts 0.8–4.3 mm (0.031–0.169 in) long at the base and similar bracteoles 0.5–1.2 mm (0.020–0.047 in) long near the base of the sepals. The sepals are pale mauve-pink with a dark red base, the lobes narrowly egg-shaped 5.6–6.3 mm (0.22–0.25 in) long and there are no petals. The anthers are reddish-purple and 1.5–2.0 mm (0.059–0.079 in) long. Flowering usually occurs from August to December.

== Taxonomy ==
Lasiopetalum glabratum was first formally described in 1974 by Susan Paust in the journal Nuytsia from specimens she collected near Mount Cooke in 1971. The specific epithet (glabratum) means "without hair".

== Distribution and habitat ==
This lasiopetalum grows in forest or woodland, in areas east of Perth in the Avon Wheatbelt, Geraldton Sandplains, Jarrah Forest and Swan Coastal Plain biogeographic regions of south-western Western Australia.

== Conservation status ==
Lasiopetalum glabratum is listed as "not threatened" by the Government of Western Australia Department of Biodiversity, Conservation and Attractions.
