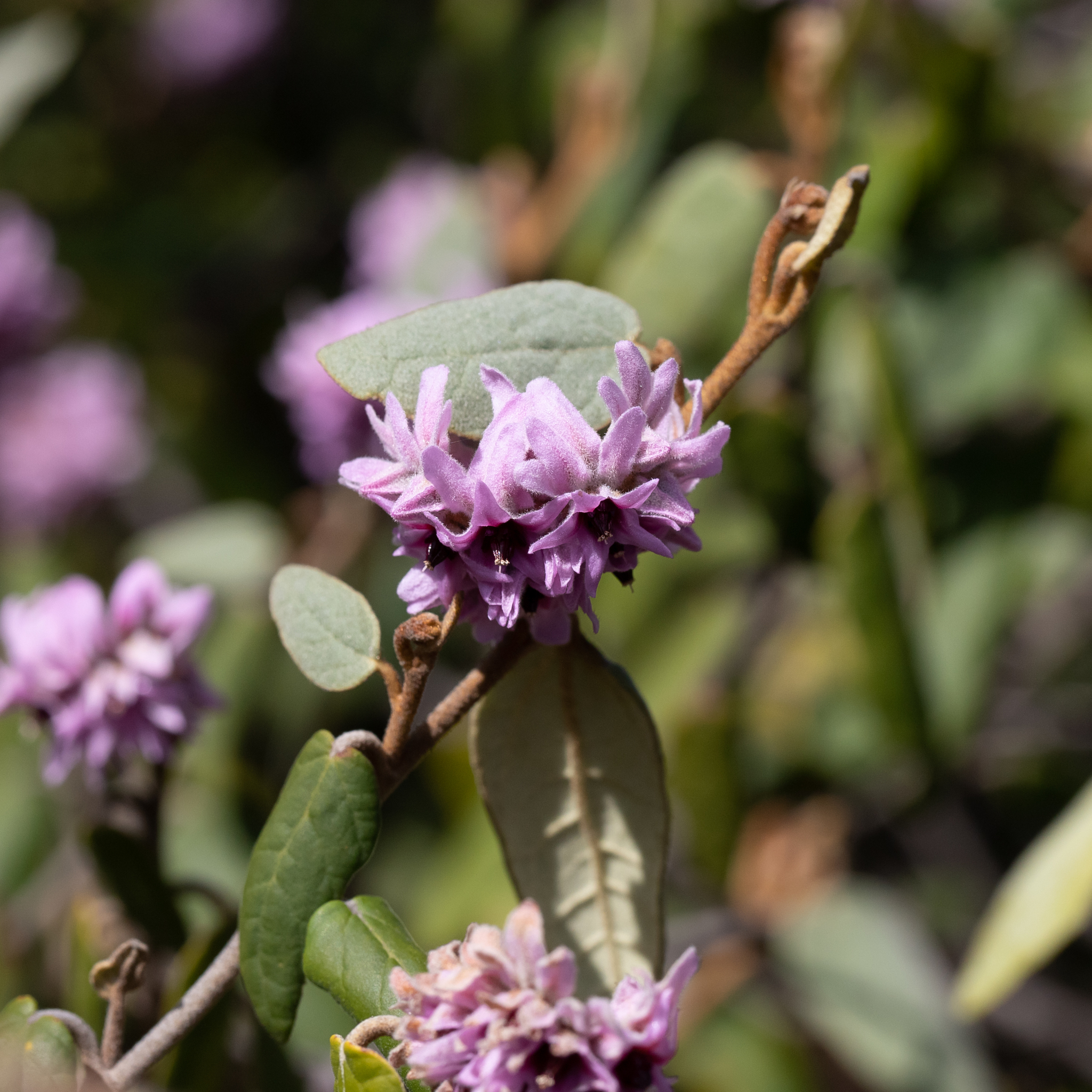
- Lasiopetalum discolor in Dhilba Guuranda–Innes National Park

Scientific classification
- Kingdom: Plantae
- Clade: Tracheophytes
- Clade: Angiosperms
- Clade: Eudicots
- Clade: Rosids
- Order: Malvales
- Family: Malvaceae
- Genus: Lasiopetalum
- Species: L. discolor

Binomial name
- Lasiopetalum discolor Hook.

= Lasiopetalum discolor =

Coast velvet-bush

Species of plant

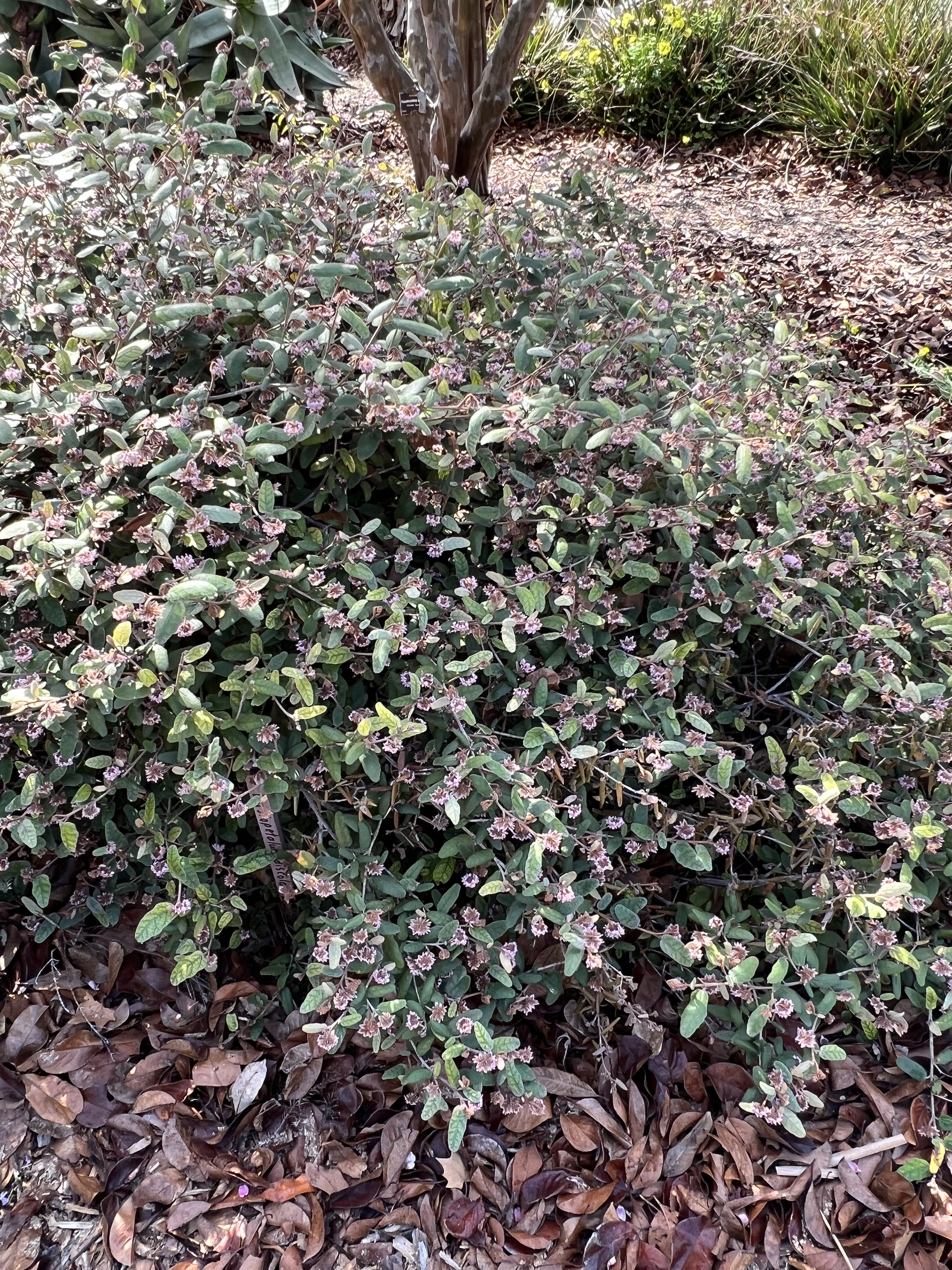
Habit

Lasiopetalum discolor, commonly known as coast velvet-bush, is a species of flowering plant in the family Malvaceae and is endemic to coastal areas of southern Australia. It is an erect, spreading or sprawling shrub with hairy stems, oblong to egg-shaped leaves and pink or white flowers.

== Description ==
Lasiopetalum discolor is a spreading shrub that typically grows to a height of 0.2–1 m (7.9 in – 3 ft 3.4 in), its stems covered with star-shaped hairs. The leaves are broadly oblong to egg-shaped, 20–80 mm (0.79–3.15 in) long, 15–50 mm (0.59–1.97 in) wide and leathery, the lower surface covered with star-shaped hairs. The flowers are up to 10 mm (0.39 in) in diameter and arranged in pendulous heads of ten or more and are sessile or on a pedicel up to 1 mm (0.039 in) long. There are three linear bracteoles at the base of the sepals, the sepals 5–7 mm (0.20–0.28 in) long, pink or white and densely hairy on the back. The petals are reddish-brown, 1.0–1.5 mm (0.039–0.059 in) long and there are five stamens. Flowering occurs from June December and the fruit is 3–4 mm (0.12–0.16 in) in diameter.

== Taxonomy ==
Lasiopetalum discolor was first formally described in 1836 by William Jackson Hooker in the Companion to the Botanical Magazine from specimens collected by James Backhouse "on Prince Seal Island, Basse's Straits". The specific epithet (discolor) refers to the upper surface of the leaves being a darker green than the lower surface.

== Distribution and habitat ==
This lasiopetalum grows in sand on coastal dunes and limestone along the south coast of Western Australia and South Australia, on Bass Strait islands and the north-west coast of Tasmania.

== Conservation status ==
Lasiopetalum discolor is listed as "rare" under the Tasmanian Government Threatened Species Protection Act 1995.
