= Heritage Park =

Heritage Park may refer to:

- Heritage park, a type of open-air heritage park

== Australia ==
- Brunswick Valley Heritage Park, Mullumbimby, New South Wales
- Heritage Park, Queensland

== Canada ==
- Heritage Park Historical Village, Calgary, Alberta
- Heritage Park, Ontario

== Ireland ==
- Bonane Heritage Park, Kenmare

== United States of America (USA) ==
Alphabetical by state

- Heritage Park Zoological Sanctuary, Prescott, Arizona
- Heritage Park (Cerritos, California)
- Heritage Park, Irvine, California
- Heritage Park (San Diego), California
- Heritage Park, Santa Fe Springs, California
- Heritage Park, Mableton, Georgia
- Heritage Park (Midland, Michigan)
- Heritage Park (Taylor, Michigan)
- Heritage Park (Colonie, New York)
- Heritage Park Mall, Midwest City, Oklahoma
- Heritage Park, Simpsonville, South Carolina
- Heritage Park (Morristown, Tennessee), now Fulton-Hill Park, on the site of the defunct Morristown College
- Heritage Park, Corpus Christi, Texas
- Heritage Park Plaza, Fort Worth, Texas
- Heritage Park, Camas, Washington
- Heritage Park (Olympia), Washington
