= List of botanical gardens in Australia =

There are more than 140 botanical gardens in Australia, some like the Australian National Botanic Gardens have collections consisting entirely of Australian native and endemic species; most have a collection that include plants from around the world. There are botanical gardens and arboreta in all states and territories of Australia, most are administered by local governments, some are privately owned.

== Australian Capital Territory ==
- Australian National Botanic Gardens, Acton
- Lindsay Pryor National Arboretum, Yarralumla
- Westbourne Woods, Yarralumla

== New South Wales ==
- Albury Botanic Gardens, Albury
- Auburn Botanical Gardens, Auburn
- Australian Inland Botanic Gardens (formerly Sunraysia Oasis Botanical Gardens), Mourquong
- Bellingen Hospital Grounds, Bellingen
- Booderee National Park and Botanic Gardens (formerly Jervis Bay Botanic Gardens), Jervis Bay
- Brunswick Valley Heritage Park, Mullumbimby
- Burrendong Botanic Garden and Arboretum, Mumbil
- Cook Park, Orange
- Cowra Japanese Garden, Cowra
- Demesne Farm Minor Arboretum, Coomba Park
- Dulegal Native Plant Arboretum, Woolomin
- Elizabeth Park, Dubbo
- E G Waterhouse National Camellia Gardens, Sutherland
- Eurobodalla Regional Botanic Gardens, Batemans Bay
- Fruit Spirit Botanical Garden, Dorroughby
- Glenbrook Native Plant Reserve, Glenbrook
- Hunter Region Botanic Gardens, Tomago
- Hunter Valley Gardens, Pokolbin
- Illawarra Grevillea Park, Bulli
- Ivanhoe Park Botanic Garden, Manly, New South Wales
- Joseph Banks Native Plants Reserve, Kareela, Sutherland
- Ku-ring-gai Wildflower Garden, St Ives
- Mayfield Garden, Oberon
- Mount Annan Botanic Garden, Mount Annan
- Mount Tomah Botanic Garden, Blue Mountains
- North Coast Regional Botanic Garden, Coffs Harbour
- Orange Botanic Gardens, Orange
- Picton Botanical Gardens, Picton
- Pilot Hill Arboretum, Tumut
- Royal Botanic Gardens, Sydney
- Southern Highlands Botanic Gardens, Southern Highlands, New South Wales
- Stony Range Botanic Garden, Dee Why
- Sylvan Grove Native Garden, Picnic Point
- Tamworth Regional Botanic Garden, Tamworth
- Tibooburra Outback Botanic Gardens, Tibooburra
- Tweed Shire Regional Botanic Gardens, Murwillumbah
- Wagga Wagga Botanic Gardens, Wagga Wagga
- Wirrimbirra Field Study Centre and Sanctuary, Bargo
- Wollongong Botanic Garden, Wollongong

== Northern Territory ==
- Alice Springs Desert Park, Alice Springs
- George Brown Darwin Botanic Gardens, Palmerston
- Olive Pink Botanic Garden, Alice Springs

== Queensland ==
- Anderson Park, Townsville
- Atherton Arboretum, Atherton
- Brisbane Botanic Gardens, Mount Coot-tha, Brisbane
- Bundaberg Botanic Gardens, Bundaberg
- City Botanic Gardens, Brisbane
- Cooktown Botanic Gardens, Cooktown
- Daintree Wilderness Refugium, Mossman
- Dan Gleeson Memorial Gardens, Townsville
- Emerald Botanic Gardens, Emerald
- Fairhill Native Plants & Botanic Gardens, Yandina
- Flecker Botanical Gardens, Cairns
- Gayndah Botanical Gardens & Pioneer Place, Gayndah
- Gold Coast Regional Botanic Gardens/Rosser Park, Benowa
- Goondiwindi Botanic Gardens of the Western Woodlands, Goondiwindi
- Hervey Bay Botanic Gardens, Hervey Bay
- Ingham Memorial Botanical Gardens, Ingham
- Kershaw Gardens, Rockhampton
- Lake McDonald Botanic Gardens, Cooroy
- Laurel Bank Park, Toowoomba
- Mackay Regional Botanic Gardens (formerly known as The Lagoons), Mackay
- Maroochy Regional Bushland Botanic Garden, Tanawha
- Myall Park Botanic Garden, Glenmorgan
- Noosa Botanic Gardens, Noosa
- Queens Gardens, Townsville
- Queens Park, Mackay
- Queens Park Gardens, Toowoomba
- Redcliffe Botanic Gardens, Redcliffe
- Rivendell Botanical Gardens, Parkhurst, Rockhampton
- Rockhampton Botanic Gardens, Rockhampton
- Sherwood Arboretum, Sherwood
- Tamborine Mountain Botanic Gardens, Tamborine Mountain
- The Botanical Ark, Mossman
- Tondoon Botanic Gardens, Gladstone
- Townsville Palmetum, Townsville

== South Australia ==
- Adelaide Botanic Garden, Adelaide
- Australian Arid Lands Botanic Garden, Port Augusta West
- Barossa Bushgardens, Nuriootpa
- Beechwood Heritage Garden, Adelaide
- Black Hill Flora Centre, Adelaide
- Currency Creek Arboretum, Currency Creek
- Mount Lofty Botanic Garden, Piccadilly
- Nangawooka Flora Park, Victor Harbor
- Nindethana, Narrung
- Pangarinda Botanic Garden, Wellington East, South Australia
- Roxby Downs Arboretum, Roxby Downs
- Terowie Arid Lands Botanical Garden, Terowie
- Waite Arboretum, University of Adelaide
- Wittunga Botanic Garden, Blackwood

== Tasmania ==
- Cliff Grounds Reserve, Launceston
- Heritage Forest, Invermay
- Royal Tasmanian Botanical Gardens, Hobart
- The Tasmanian Arboretum, Devonport, Tasmania
- Tasmanian Bushland Garden, Buckland

== Victoria ==
- Alfred Nicholas Memorial Garden, Sherbrooke
- Ballarat Botanical Gardens, Ballarat
- Benalla Botanical Gardens, Benalla
- Buninyong Botanic Gardens, Buninyong
- Camperdown Botanic Gardens, Camperdown
- Castlemaine Botanic Gardens, Castlemaine
- Colac Botanic Gardens, Colac
- Dandenong Ranges Botanic Garden, Olinda
- Geelong Botanic Gardens, Geelong
- George Pentland Botanic Gardens, Frankston
- George Tindale Memorial Garden, Sherbrooke
- Gisborne Botanic Gardens, Gisborne
- Hamilton Botanic Gardens, Hamilton
- Horsham Rural City Council Botanic Gardens, Horsham
- Karwarra Australian Native Botanic Garden (Dandenong Ranges), Kalorama
- Keilor Botanic Gardens, Keilor
- Kyneton Botanic Gardens, Kyneton
- Malmsbury Botanic Gardens, Malmsbury
- Mornington Botanical Rose Gardens, Mornington
- Penshurst Botanic Gardens, Penshurst
- Pirianda Garden, Olinda
- Portland Botanical Gardens, Portland
- Port Fairy Botanic Gardens, Port Fairy
- RJ Hamer Arboretum, Olinda
- Royal Botanic Gardens, Cranbourne
- Royal Botanic Gardens, Melbourne
- Sale Botanic Gardens, Sale
- St Kilda Botanical Gardens, St Kilda, Melbourne
- Victoria State Rose Garden (Werribee Park), Werribee
- Warrnambool Botanic Gardens, Warrnambool
- Werribee Park Formal Gardens, Werribee
- White Hills Botanic Gardens, Bendigo
- Williamstown Botanic Gardens, Williamstown
- Wilson Botanic Park, Berwick
- Wombat Hill Botanical Gardens, Daylesford

== Western Australia ==
- Araluen Botanical Park, Roleystone
- Big Brook Forest Arboretum, Pemberton
- Coolgardie Arboretum, Kalgoorlie
- Derby Botanic Gardens, Derby
- Dryandra Inland Arboretum, Narrogin
- Esperance (Helms) Exotic & Indigenous Arboretum, Esperance
- Forest Arboretum, Pemberton
- Kalgoorlie Arboretum, Kalgoorlie
- Kings Park and Botanic Garden, Perth
- Mount Martin Regional Botanic Park, Albany
- Wanneroo Botanic Gardens (privately owned and operated), Wanneroo

== External territories ==
- Lord Howe Island Botanic Gardens, Lord Howe Island
- Norfolk Island Botanic Gardens, Norfolk Island

== See also ==
- Gardening in Australia
