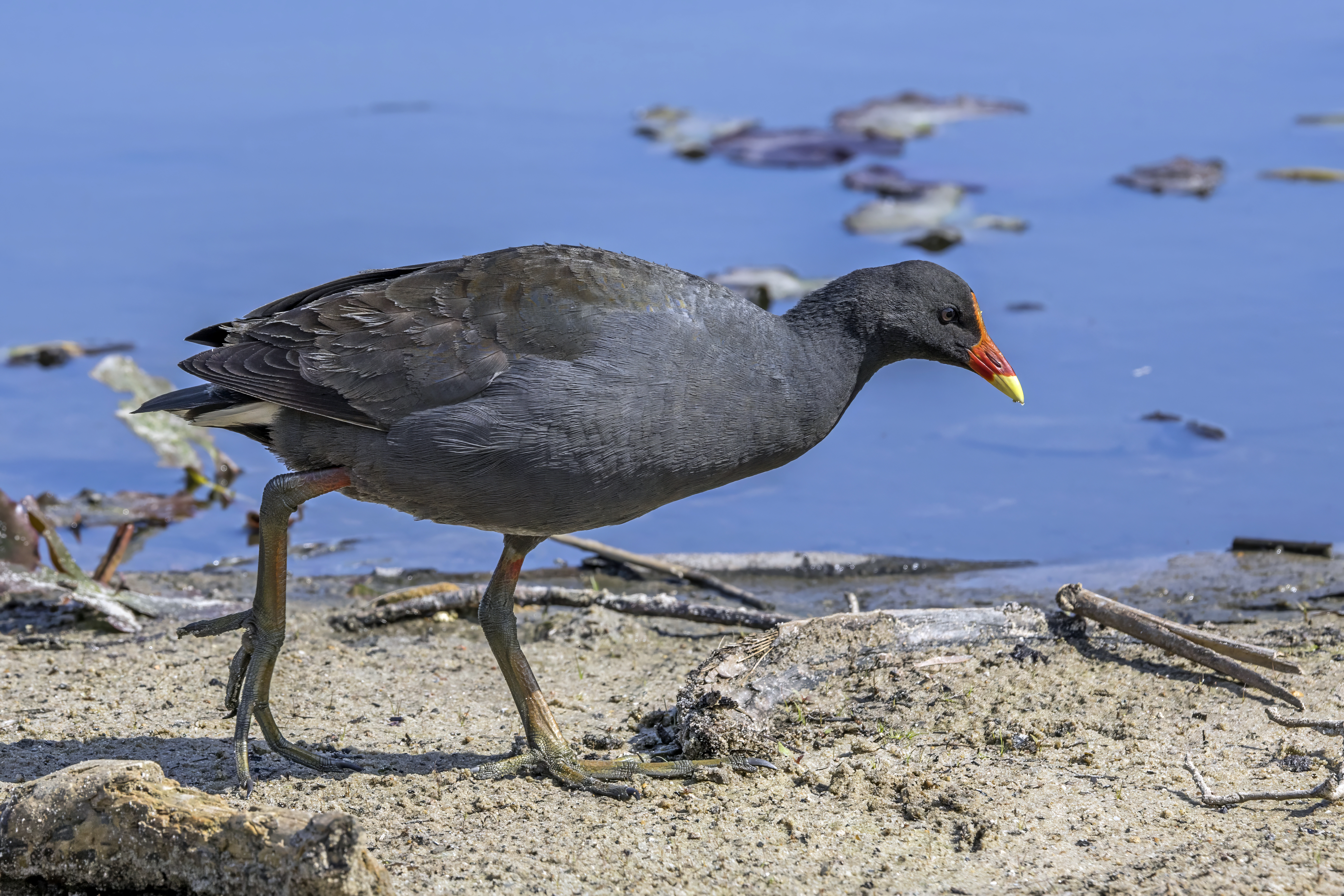
- Gallinula tenebrosa tenebrosa, New South Wales

Conservation status
- Least Concern (IUCN 3.1)

Scientific classification
- Kingdom: Animalia
- Phylum: Chordata
- Class: Aves
- Order: Gruiformes
- Family: Rallidae
- Genus: Gallinula
- Species: G. tenebrosa

Binomial name
- Gallinula tenebrosa Gould, 1846

Synonyms
- Gallinula haematopus Bonaparte, 1856; Gallinula tenebrosa magnirostris Mathews, 1912; Gallinula tenebrosa subfrontata Mathews, 1912

= Dusky moorhen =

Species of bird

The dusky moorhen (Gallinula tenebrosa) is a bird species in the rail family and is one of the eight extant species in the moorhen genus. It occurs in Australia, New Guinea, Borneo and Indonesia. It is often confused with the purple swamphen and the Eurasian coot due to similar appearance and overlapping distributions. They often live alongside birds in the same genus, such as the Tasmanian nativehen and the common moorhen.

== Taxonomy ==
John Gould described the dusky moorhen in 1846 from a skin collected along the Murray River in South Australia. Its species name is derived from the Latin tenebrosa "dark". Charles Lucien Bonaparte described Gallinula haematopus in 1856, but this is now a nomen nudum. Gregory Mathews described two subspecies that have been synonymized—magnirostris from Western Australia and subfrontata from New South Wales.

Three subspecies are recognised: subspecies frontata from southeastern Borneo, the Sunda Islands, Timor and western New Guinea, subspecies neumannii from northern New Guinea, and the nominate subspecies from Australia.

Common names include dusky moorhen, black gallinule, black moorhen and waterhen.

== Description ==
The dusky moorhen is a medium-sized bird, slightly smaller than the purple swamphen. The New Guinea birds are smaller, at 25–32 centimetres (9.8–12.6 in) in length, than the Australian race 34–38 centimetres (13–15 in). Adult males generally weigh on average around 570 grams and adult females 493 grams. The adult dusky moorhen is mainly dark grey-black, with a browner tinge to the upper parts. It has a red frontal shield and yellow-tipped red bill like its Eurasian relative, but lacks the white flank line shown by common moorhen, and has orange-yellow rather than yellow legs. The Australian subspecies is larger and pager than both other subspecies.

During autumn and winter, the colour of the frontal shield grows duller in females and young males. During the warmer months, in the breeding season, the shield grows brighter again in both sexes.

=== Diet ===
The dusky moorhen feeds both on land and in water. Its diet consists of seeds, the tips of shrubs and grasses, algae, fruits, molluscs, and other invertebrates. It will also consume carrion, bread and droppings from birds including gulls and ducks. The chicks are fed mostly on annelid worms and molluscs, with plant matter gradually being given in increasing proportions by the parents as the young mature.

=== Voice ===
The territorial call is a loud kurk or krik, which may be repeated or run together, sounding like kurruk-uk. This call is taken up by birds in surrounding territories and can be heard from over two kilometres away. The birds also make a series of short, sharp squawks and squeaks as alarm calls. Swimming and preening birds may make a series of short, stacatto, widely spaced noises.

Both sexes make a soft mewing noise, or a soft kook noise before and during courtship. Adults may make a quiet hissing noise when their eggs are disturbed. Chicks under the age of three months make a repeated shrill piping noise when begging, when an adult approaches with food, and when they are separated from adults. Adults also make short clicking noises when separated from chicks, and the young give a series of descending whistles in response.

== Distribution and habitat ==
It occurs in Australia, New Guinea, Borneo and Indonesia. Some vagrant, non-breeding birds may be found in New Zealand as well. In Australia, they are found all across the eastern states of Victoria, New South Wales and Queensland as far north as Cooktown, as well as the eastern part South Australia and the south-western tip of Western Australia. It is also found in parts of Tasmania and South Australia, but are uncommon. Included in their natural distribution range are wildlife parks such as Currumbin Wildlife Sanctuary and the Brisbane Botanic Gardens.

The dusky moorhen is found in wetland habitats, with a preference for freshwater marshes and swamps, and are rarely found far from these areas except when foraging in nearby vegetation. They are also found in urban parks such as Gold Coast Regional Botanic Gardens and often in dams and river banks. They require open water, usually with some cover such as grass, reeds, and other vegetation. In south-east Queensland, they are more likely to be found in areas with taller vegetation, more attached aquatic vegetation, and a larger number of purple swamphens, indicating that the availability of food and other resources affects their numbers and distribution in wetlands. They usually live in low-lying areas, although a pair have been found as high up as 1,580 metres in New Guinea, likely having been separated from their flock.

The birds do not often migrate long distances, and may remain in the same location for eight years or more. They may move to different locations within their range when resources become scarce. Young birds leave their place of birth in autumn and spring, and may be found in locations not normally frequented by adult birds.

== Behaviour ==
Breeding season is from August to January in the south of Australia, with generally one brood, and January to June in the north, often brooding twice. This species builds a bulky nest of reeds or grasses at the water's edge or a few centimetres above the water, often at the base of a Melaleuca and lays a clutch of 5–11 matte whitish eggs that are covered with red-brown dots and splotches. Tapered oval in shape, they measure 53 mm long by 36 mm wide each and have more prominent markings at the larger end. It is territorial when breeding, but otherwise gregarious. The dusky moorhen may nest alongside the purple swamphen.

Dusky moorhens are diurnal, and roost at nighttime alone, in breeding groups, or in non-breeding flocks. They roost on platforms constructed in reeds set above the water, on branches over the water, and more rarely on the ground in the reeds. During the day they rest at these places, and may also sit on floating vegetation, rocks, logs, and on the banks. In hot weather they may sit high up in trees.

The moorhens frequently flick their conspicuous white and black tail. This may be a signal of alertness or of social status, depending on the context.

== Gallery ==
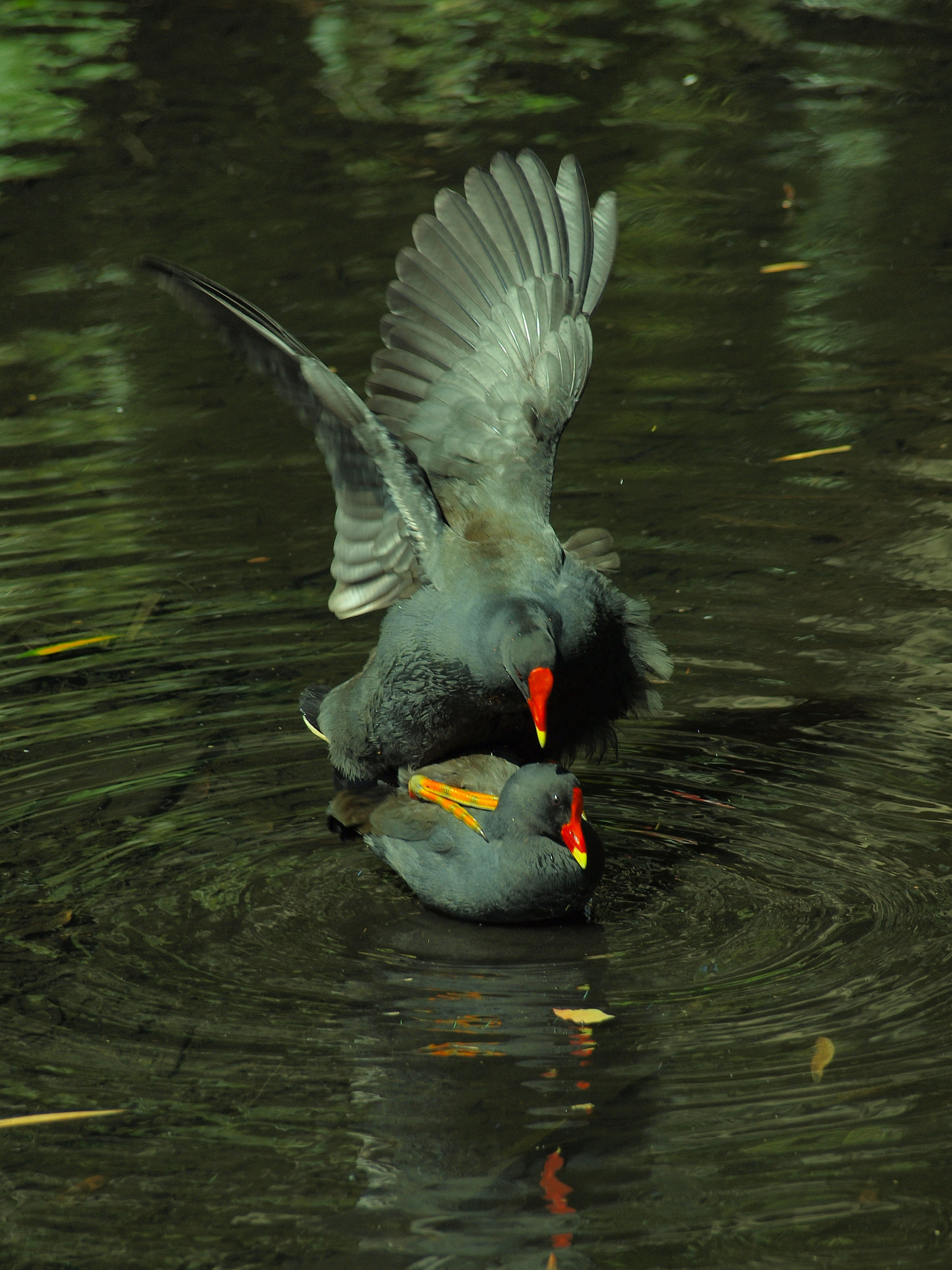
Mating

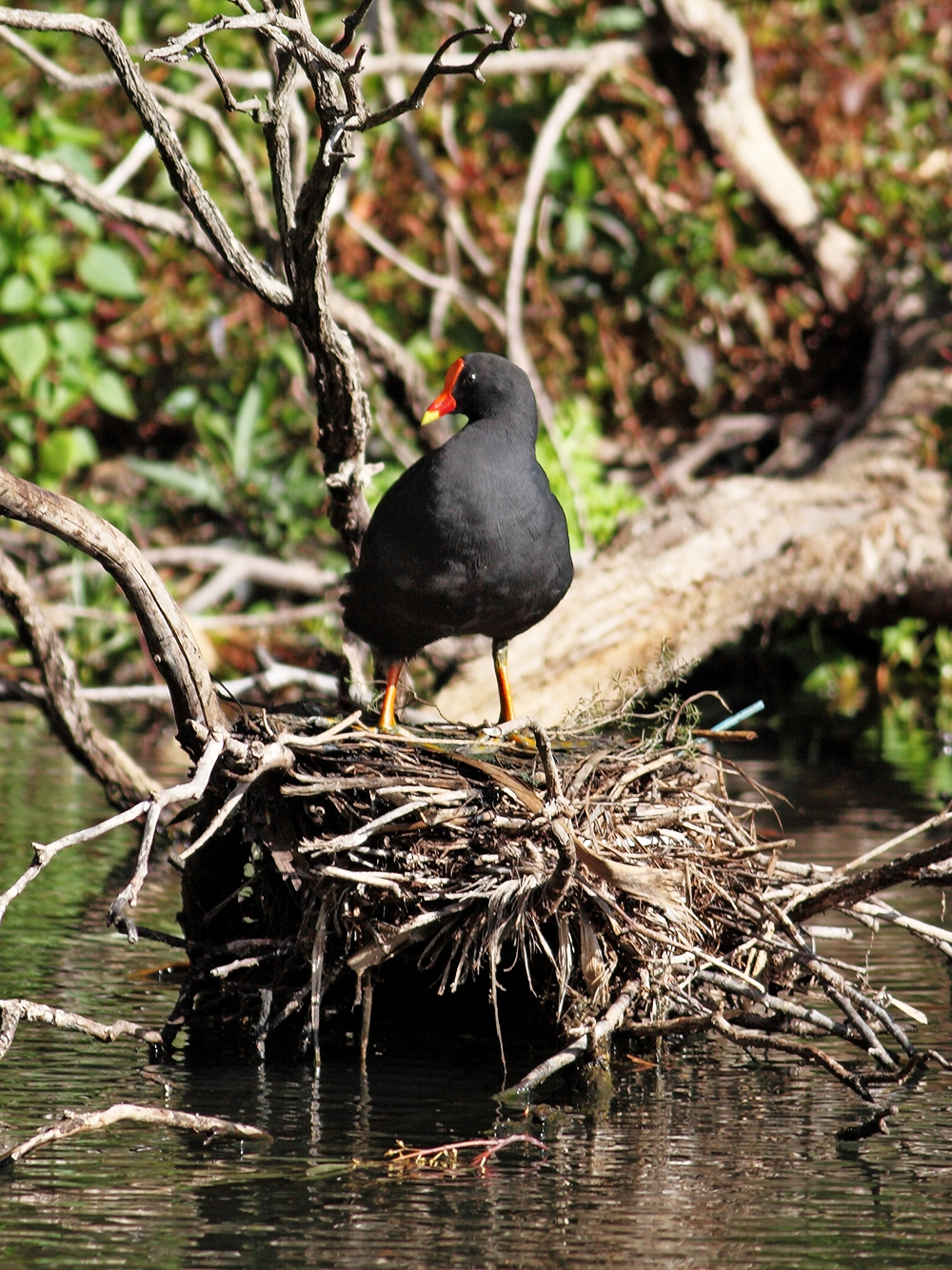
Nesting

Adults with chicks

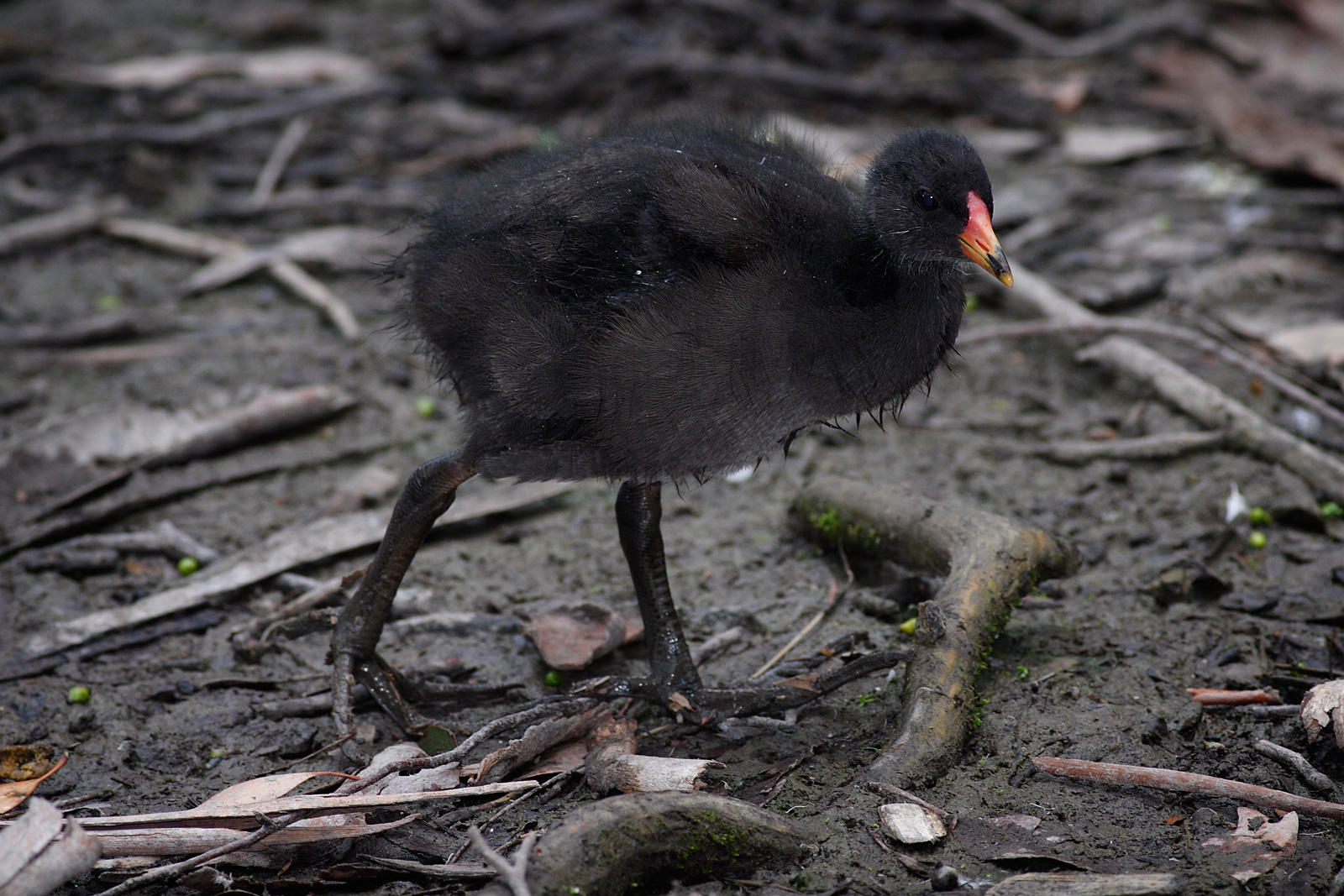
Juvenile

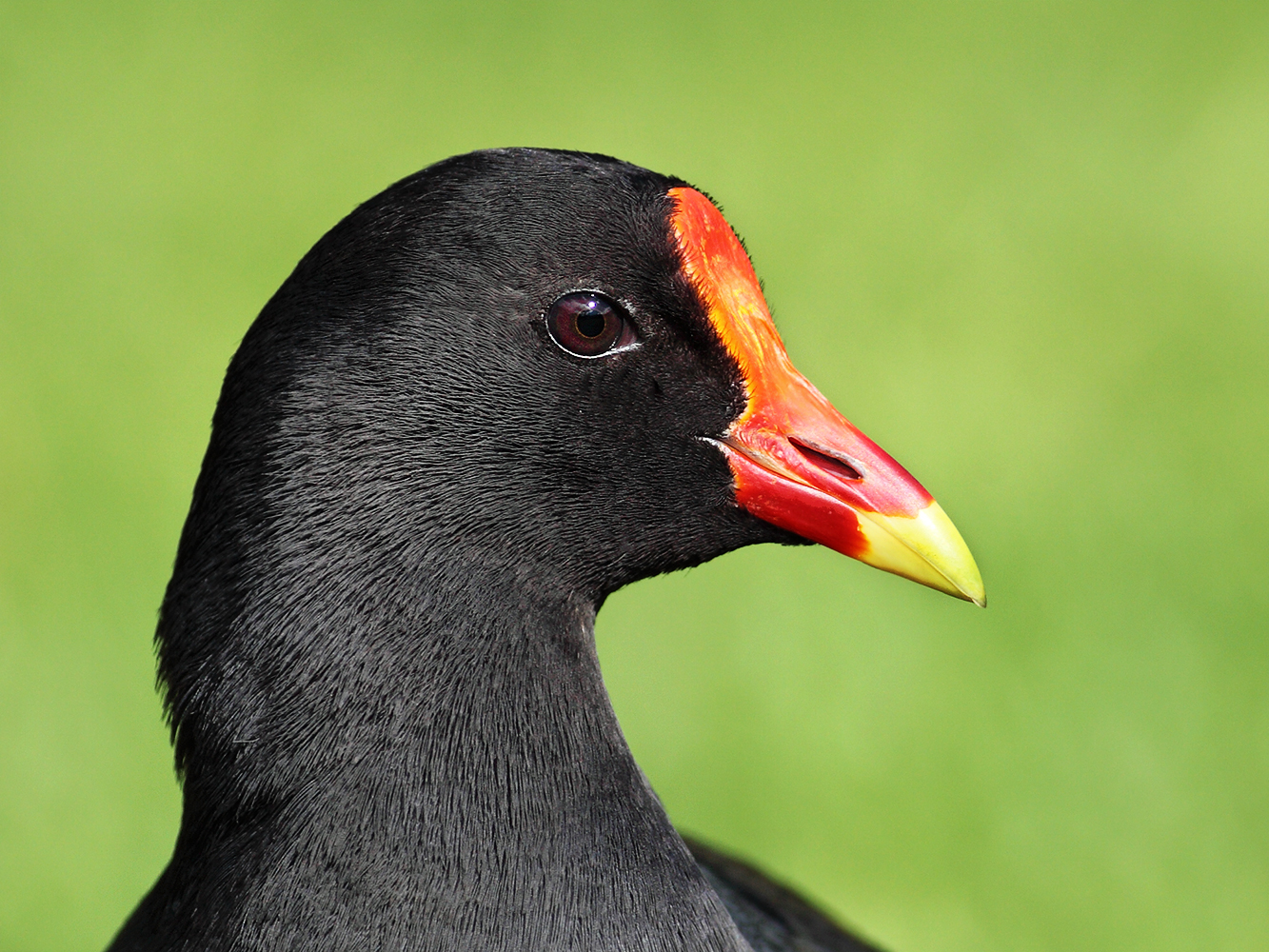
Head and cere detail

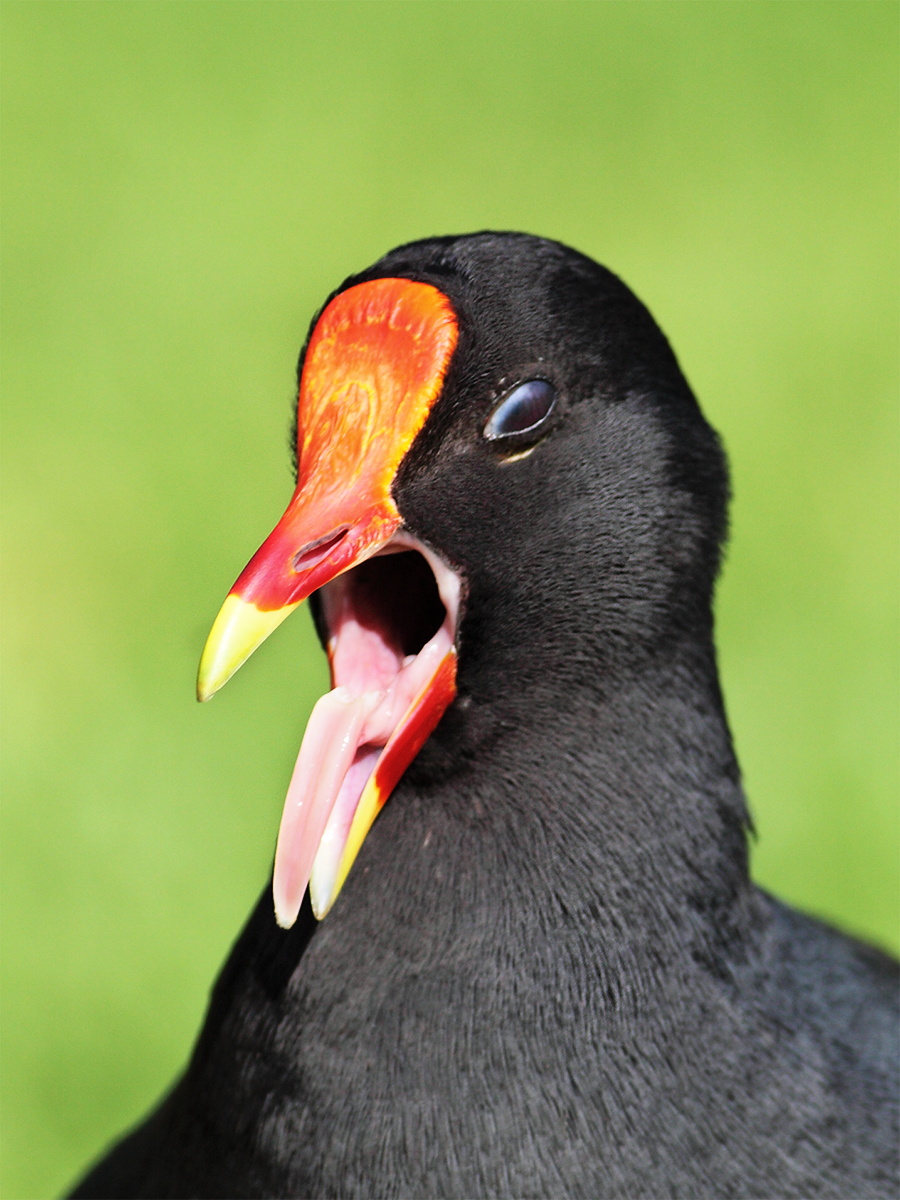
Beak and tongue detail

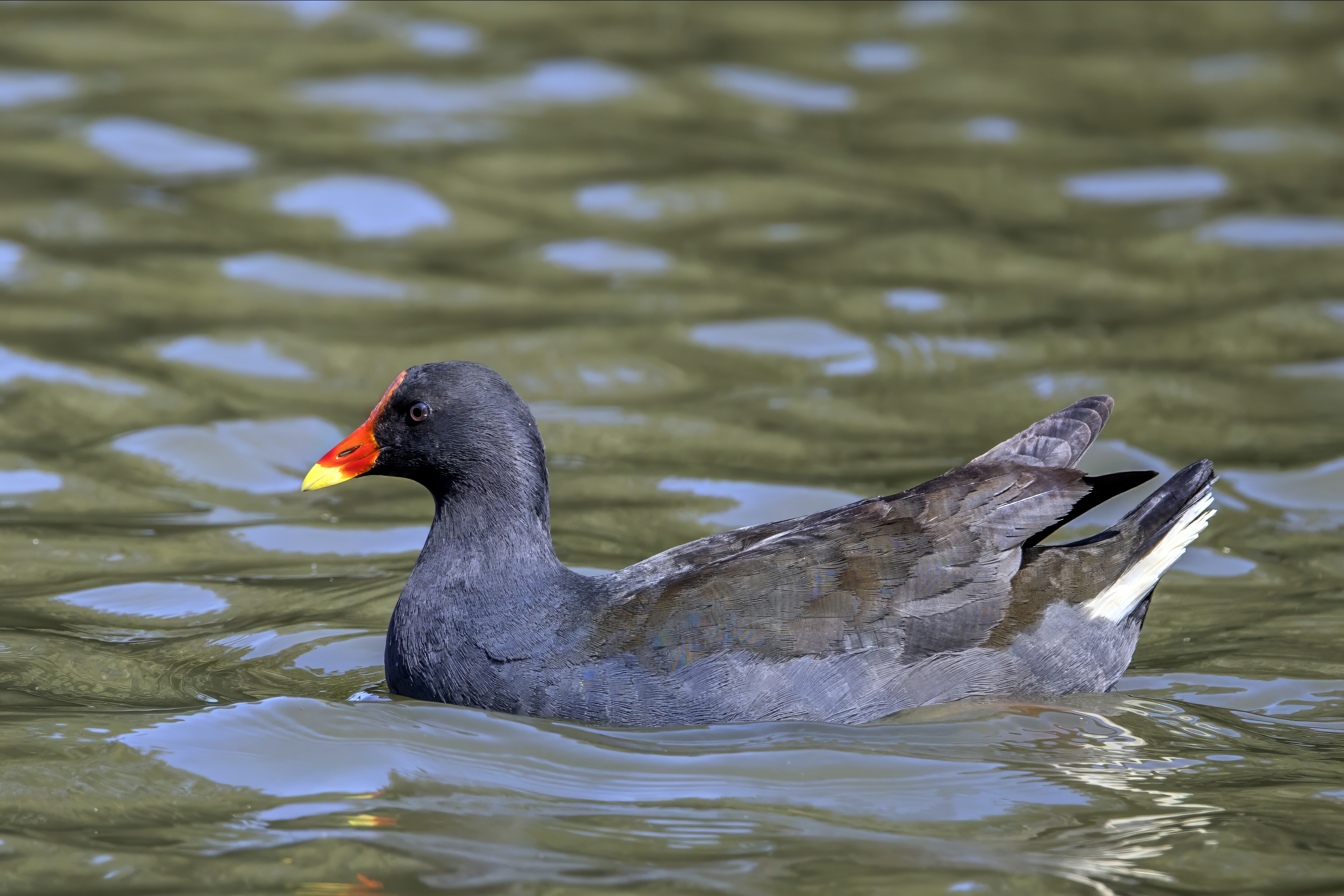
In water
