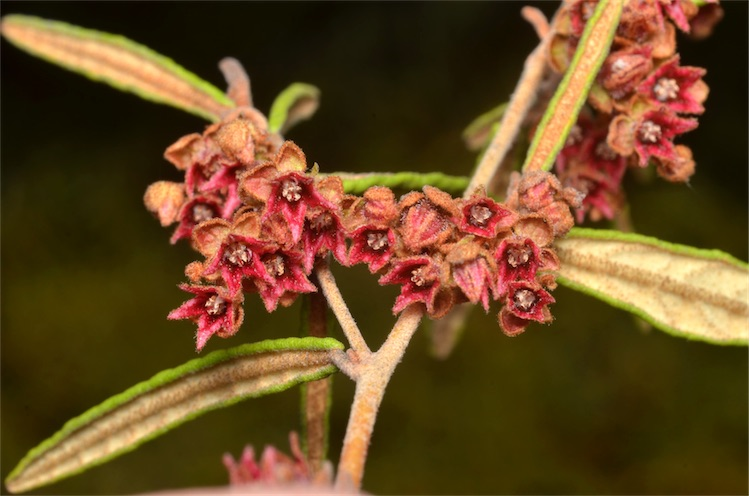
- Lasiopetalum micranthum in the Tasmanian Bushland Garden

Conservation status
- Priority Three — Poorly Known Taxa (DEC)

Scientific classification
- Kingdom: Plantae
- Clade: Tracheophytes
- Clade: Angiosperms
- Clade: Eudicots
- Clade: Rosids
- Order: Malvales
- Family: Malvaceae
- Genus: Lasiopetalum
- Species: L. micranthum

Binomial name
- Lasiopetalum micranthum Hook.f.

= Lasiopetalum micranthum =

Tasmanian velvetbush

Species of shrub

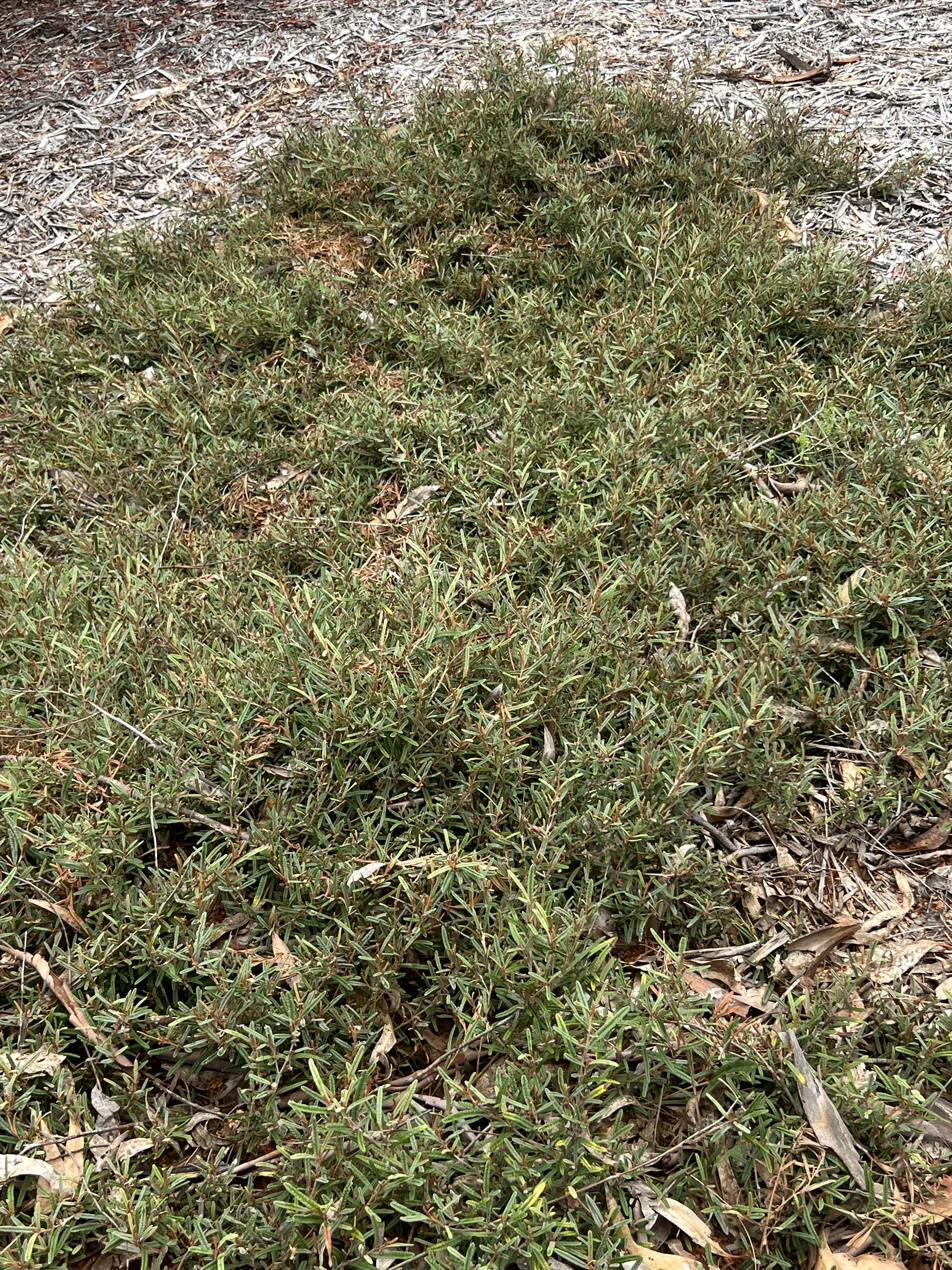
Habit

Lasiopetalum micranthum is a species of flowering plant in the family Malvaceae and is endemic to a small region of eastern Tasmania. It is a low, spreading shrub with thin, rusty-hairy branches, narrow oblong leaves and drooping, star-shaped red to greyish-pink or white flowers.

== Description ==
Lasiopetalum micranthum is a low, spreading shrub that typically grows to a height of up to 50 cm (20 in), its branches covered with rust-coloured, star-shaped hairs. The leaves are narrow oblong, mostly 29–60 mm (1.1–2.4 in) long, the edges rolled under and depressions above the veins on the upper surface. The flowers are borne in drooping groups with brown sepal-like bracts and red to greyish-pink or white petal-like sepals. The fruit is a hairy capsule up to 8 mm (0.31 in) wide.

== Taxonomy ==
Lasiopetalum micranthum was first formally described in 1855 by Joseph Dalton Hooker in The botany of the Antarctic voyage of H.M. Discovery ships Erebus and Terror from a specimen collected by Ronald Campbell Gunn. The specific epithet (micranthum) means "small-flowered".

== Distribution and habitat ==
This lasiopetalum grows in forest or woodland at altitudes of up to 300 m (980 ft) in the central east coast of Tasmania between the Meredith and Swan Rivers near Swansea.

== Conservation status ==
Lasiopetalum micranthum is listed as "rare" under the Tasmanian Government Threatened Species Protection Act 1995.
