= St Kilda Botanical Gardens =

Botanical garden in St Kilda, Victoria, Australia

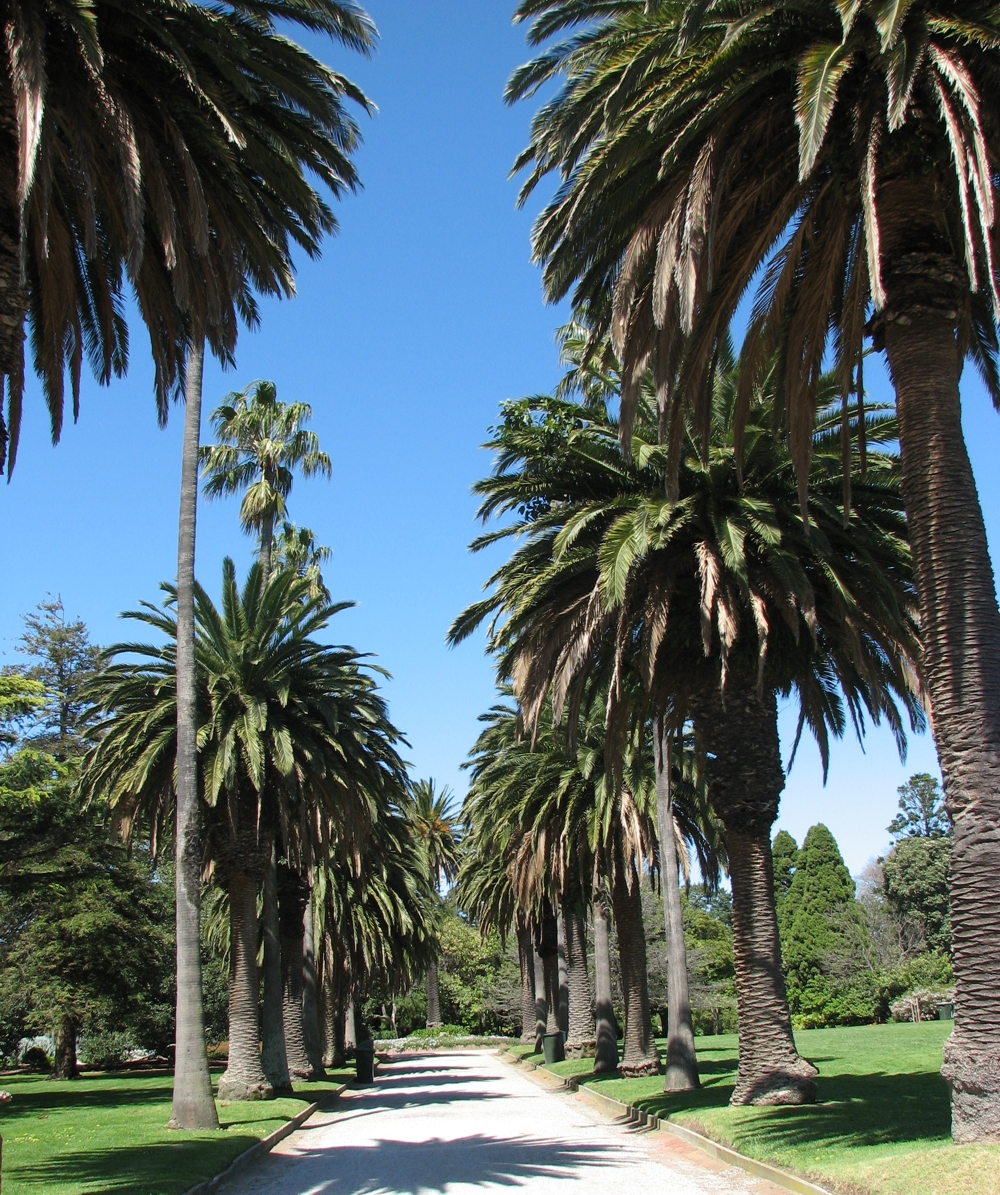
- A palm-lined path in the gardens

- Location within Melbourne
- Interactive map of St Kilda Botanical Gardens
- Type: Botanical garden
- Location: St Kilda, Melbourne, Victoria, Australia
- Coordinates: 37°52′15″S 144°59′02″E
- Area: 6 ha (15 acres)
- Opened: 28 September 1859; 166 years ago
- Founder: City of St Kilda
- Designer: Tilman Gloystein
- Operator: City of Port Phillip
- Status: Open
- Public transit: –, – 246, 600, 922, 923, 246
- Landmarks: Ornamental pond; conservatory; Ecocentre; Alister Clarke Rose Garden
- Facilities: Toilets; playground
- Website: portphillip.vic.gov.au

Victorian Heritage Register
- Official name: St Kilda Botanical Gardens
- Type: Registered place
- Designated: 7 October 1999
- Reference no.: H1804
- Category: Parks, Gardens and Trees
- Heritage overlay no.: HO344

The St Kilda Botanical Gardens are a botanical garden located in the suburb of St Kilda, in Melbourne, Victoria, Australia. Established on the former site of a gravel pit and rubbish dump, they were formally gazetted on 28 September 1859 and opened in 1861. The gardens are operated by the City of Port Phillip.

The gardens were added to the Victorian Heritage Register on 7 October 1999 due to their historical, aesthetic, scientific (horticultural) and social significance.

== Overview ==
Two years after the incorporation of the City of St Kilda in 1857, municipal authorities set aside 6.5 hectares (16 acres) for the establishment of a botanical garden. Tilman Gloystein won a design competition and the gardens are laid out on a north–south path axis. Some of the initial plantings were sourced from the Royal Botanic Gardens in Melbourne; and Ferdinand von Mueller consulted on plant selection and placement.

Initially constrained by a 1.8-metre-high (6 ft) picket fence, the boundary was later replaced by a cypress hedge. The gravel pit was exhausted in the 1920s and at that time, the gardens were semi-completed.

Between 1948 and 1950, the Alister Clark Memorial Rose Garden (Note: This garden should not be confused with the comprehensive Alister Clark Memorial Rose Garden at Bulla, north of Melbourne.) was developed, named in honour of Alister Clark, a well-known Australian rose breeder. In 1985 it was redesigned as a sunken garden. At one time the rose garden contained a large selection of roses bred by Clark. The garden was subsequently renewed with roses bred by David Austin.

In the early 1990s, a sub-tropical rainforest conservatory was added. Other notable features include an ornamental pond, an Ecocentre, and a solar-powered sculptured fountain by Corey Thomas and Ken Arnold that uses recycled water from the pond below.

To celebrate the 150th anniversary of the Gardens, in October 2010 four new gates were installed on Tennyson, Dickens and Herbert Streets, designed and sculpted by blacksmith, David Wood. A fifth gate was installed in 2012.

== Gallery ==
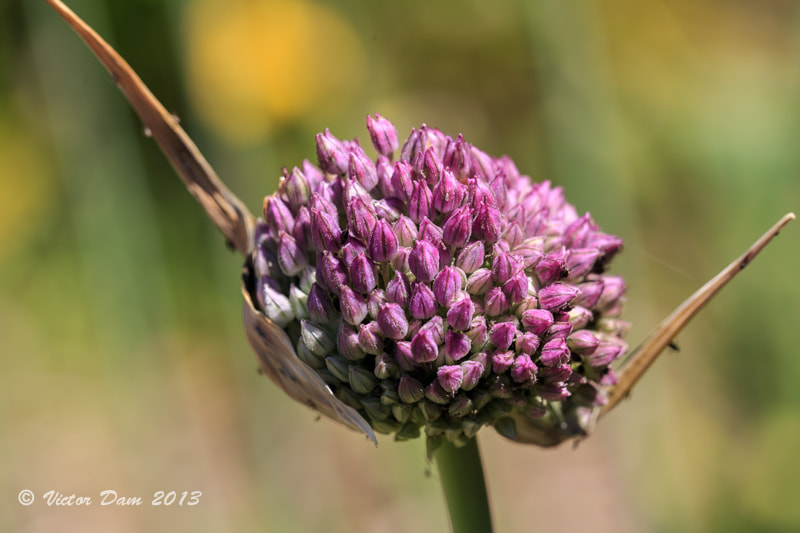
An allium in the gardens, in 2013

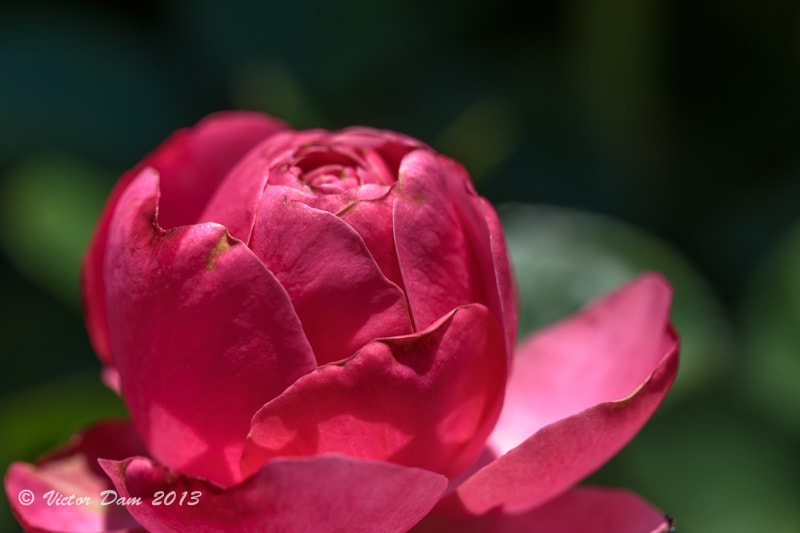
A pink rose in the gardens, in 2013

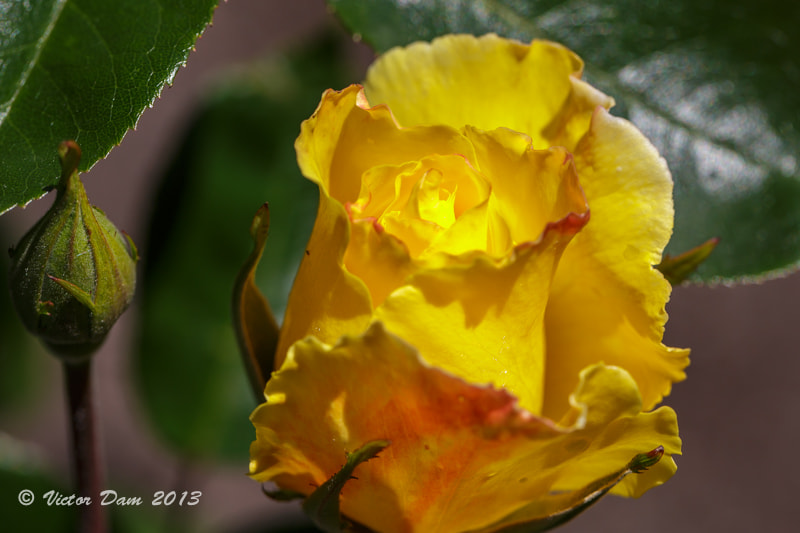
A yellow rose in the gardens, in 2013

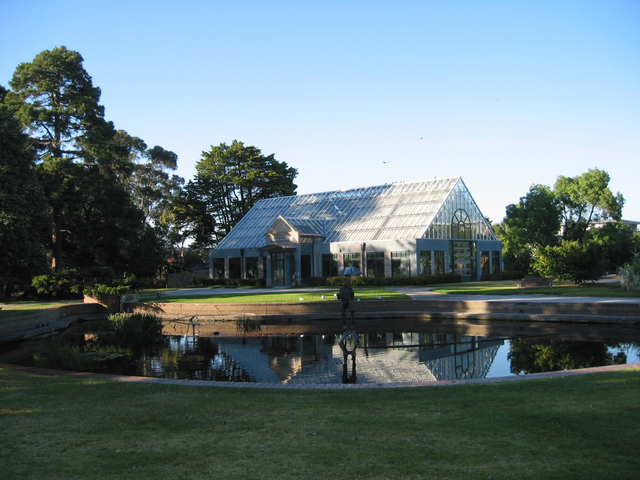
The conservatory, in 2009

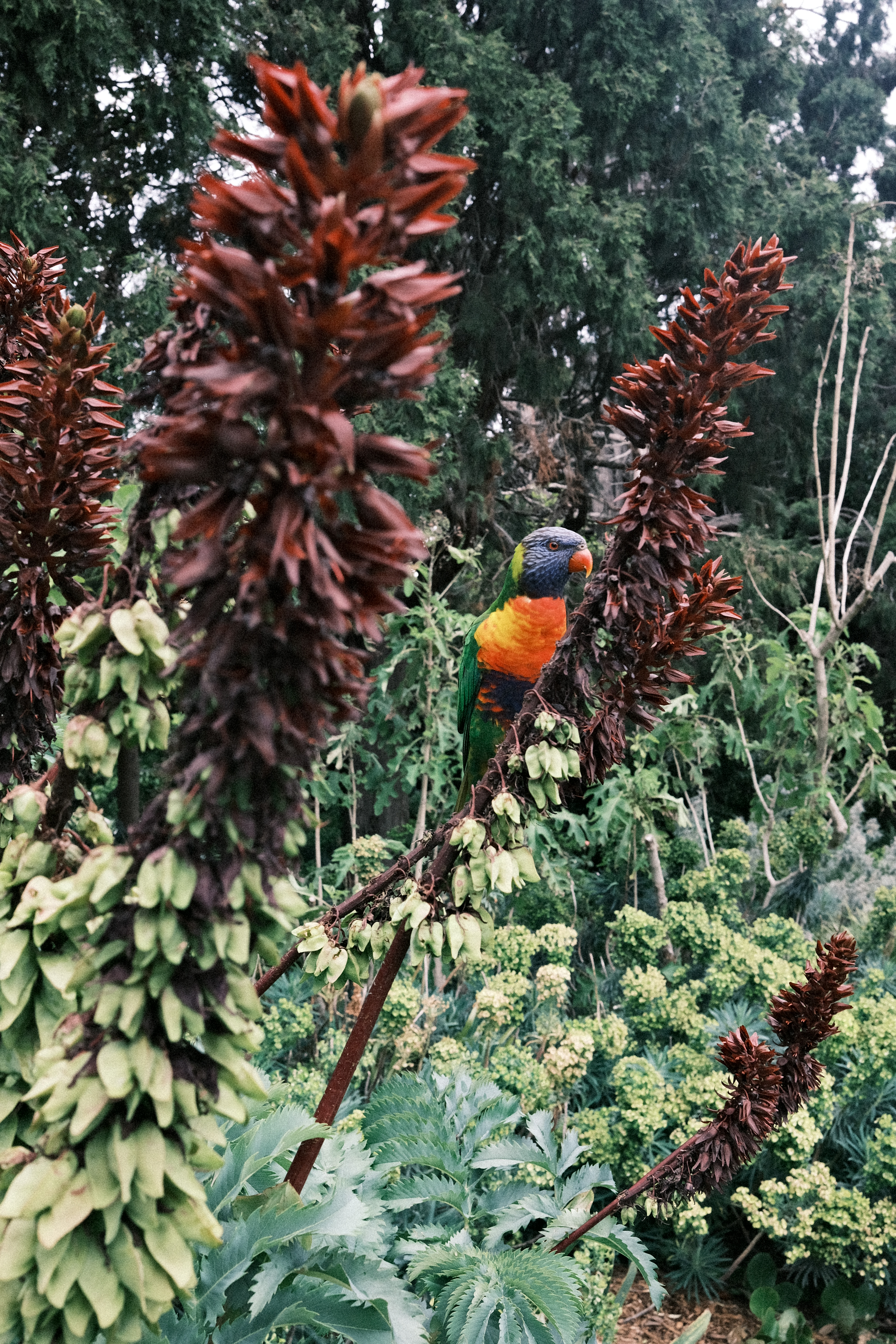
Rainbow lorikeet, in 2025

== See also ==
- Parks and gardens of Melbourne
- Heritage gardens in Australia
- List of botanical gardens in Victoria
- List of heritage-listed buildings in Melbourne
