= Gold Coast Regional Botanic Gardens =

Botanical garden in Benowa, Gold Coast, Queensland

Coordinates: 28.0083°S 153.3849°E

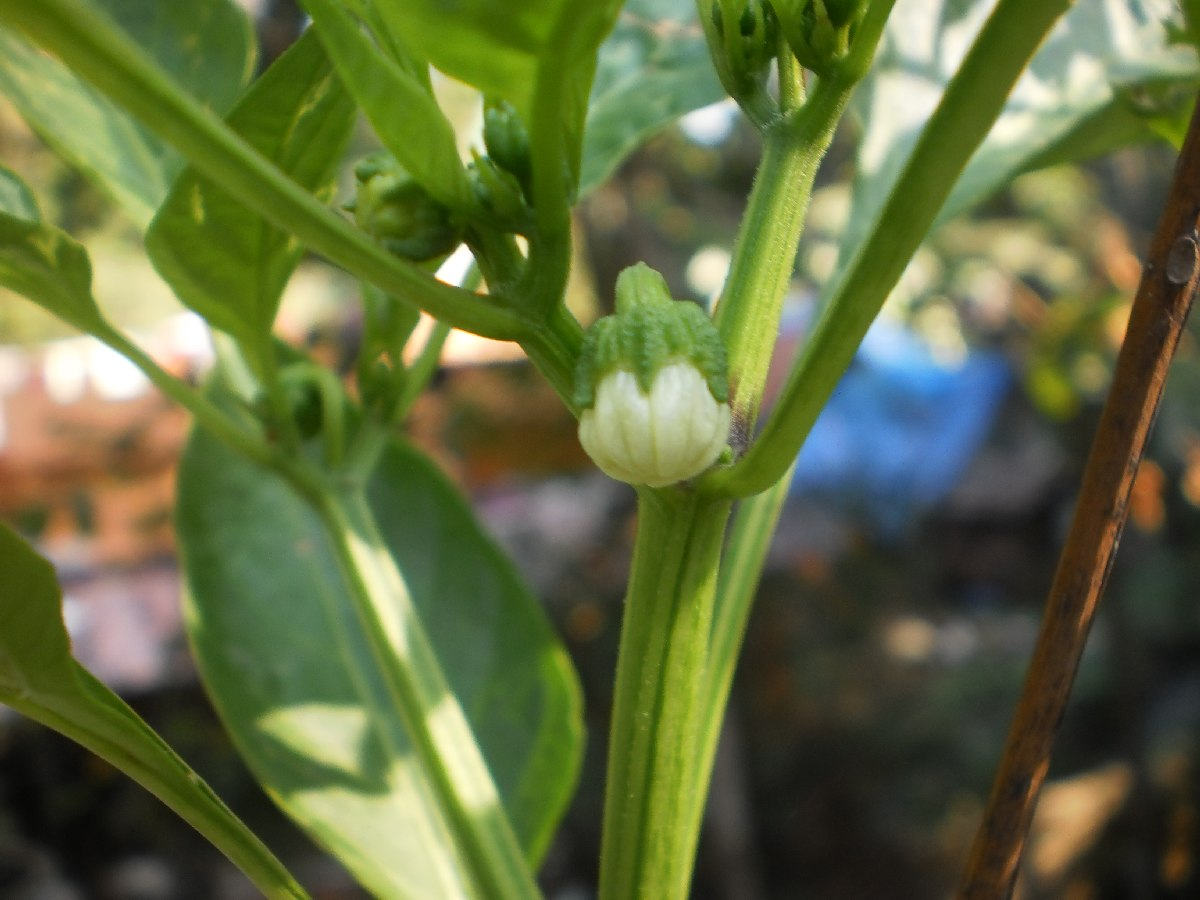
Flower-Capsicum-Chilli

The Gold Coast Regional Botanic Gardens, formerly known as the Rosser Park Regional Botanic Gardens, and before that simply Rosser Park, are located on Ashmore Road, Benowa, Gold Coast, Australia. The south-west boundary of the park extends down to the Nerang River, the Royal Pines Resort Golf Course runs all along the northern boundary and Benowa Waters residential area is located to the south.

The gardens have a large variety of plants, including raised vegetable, fruit and herb gardens. These gardens contain a variety of vegetables such as tomatoes and chilis. This creates a centre of learning for all children and adults and makes it possible for one to see how easy it is to grow these vegetables.

== History and development ==
In 1969 John and Essie Rosser, local honey producers, donated 2.02ha to the city for the establishment of a park. In 2000, Council formally ratified this park, then known as 'Rosser Park', as the city's botanical garden.

The development of the master plan for the botanic gardens involved more than 18 months' investigation, site analysis and community consultation. The plan was finally adopted by City of Gold Coast in 2002. In November 2003, the master plan for what was then proposed to be a $12 million project received acclaim for its design and community involvement.

The inaugural Community Tree Planting Day and opening ceremony was held on 27 July 2003.

By February 2006, the garden's transformation was well underway, with the new rose garden and a mangrove-to-mountains section having been recently completed.

== Sensory garden ==
In February 2006, Rotary International in partnership with Council created a sensory garden for people with disabilities to explore the five senses. Members of Rotary International and students from AB Paterson School reportedly planted more than 3400 plants in this garden.

== Gallery ==
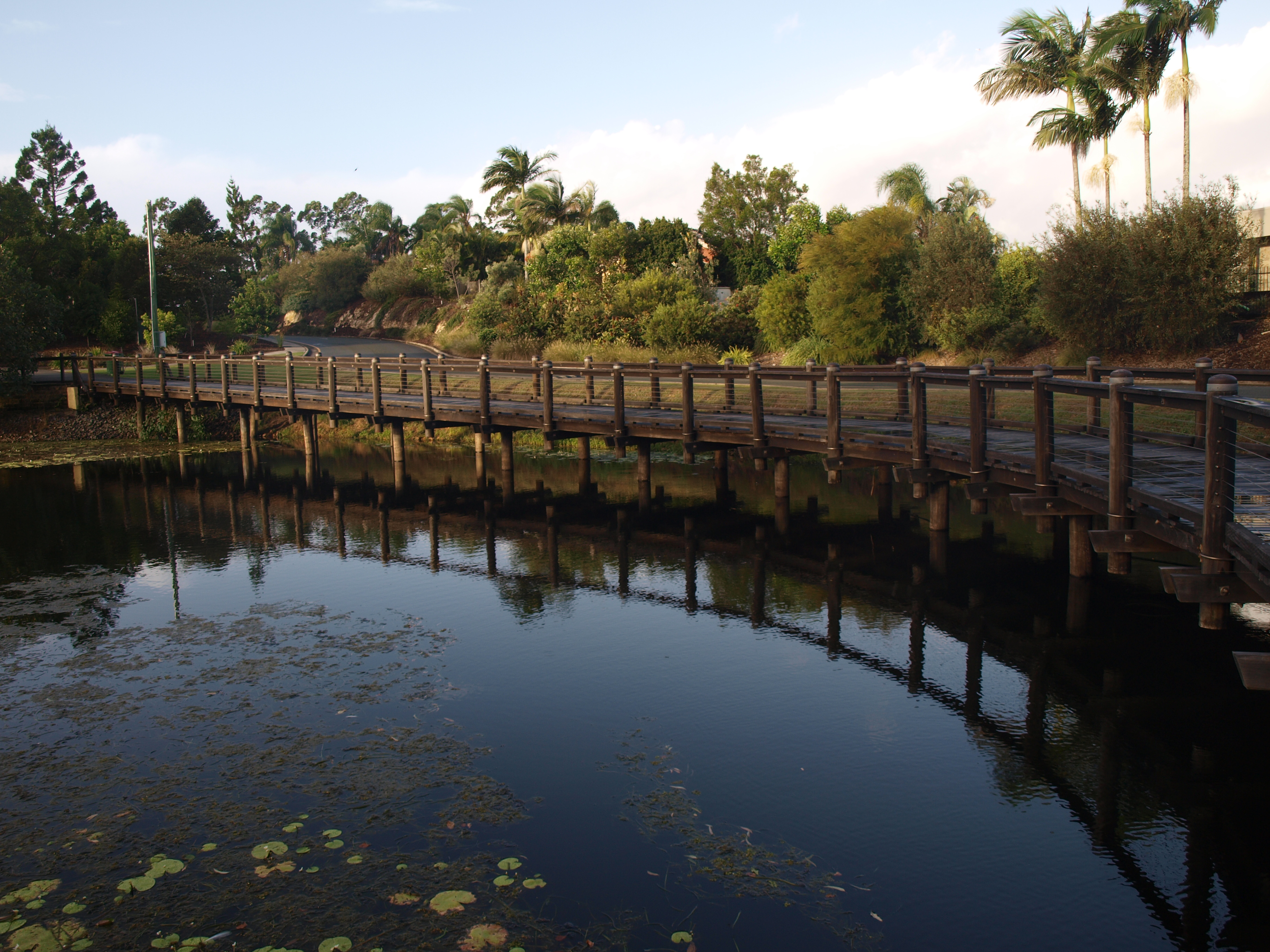

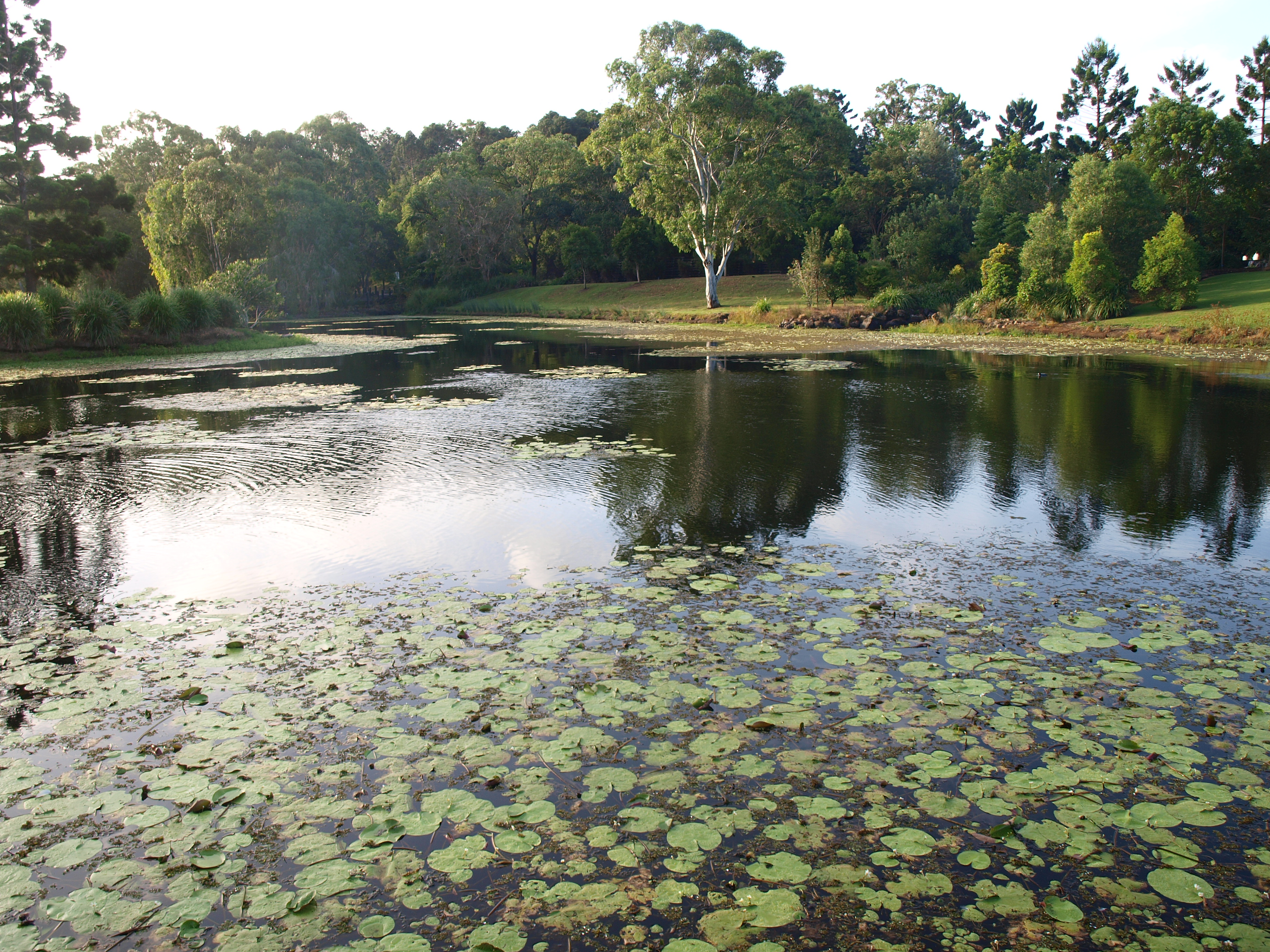

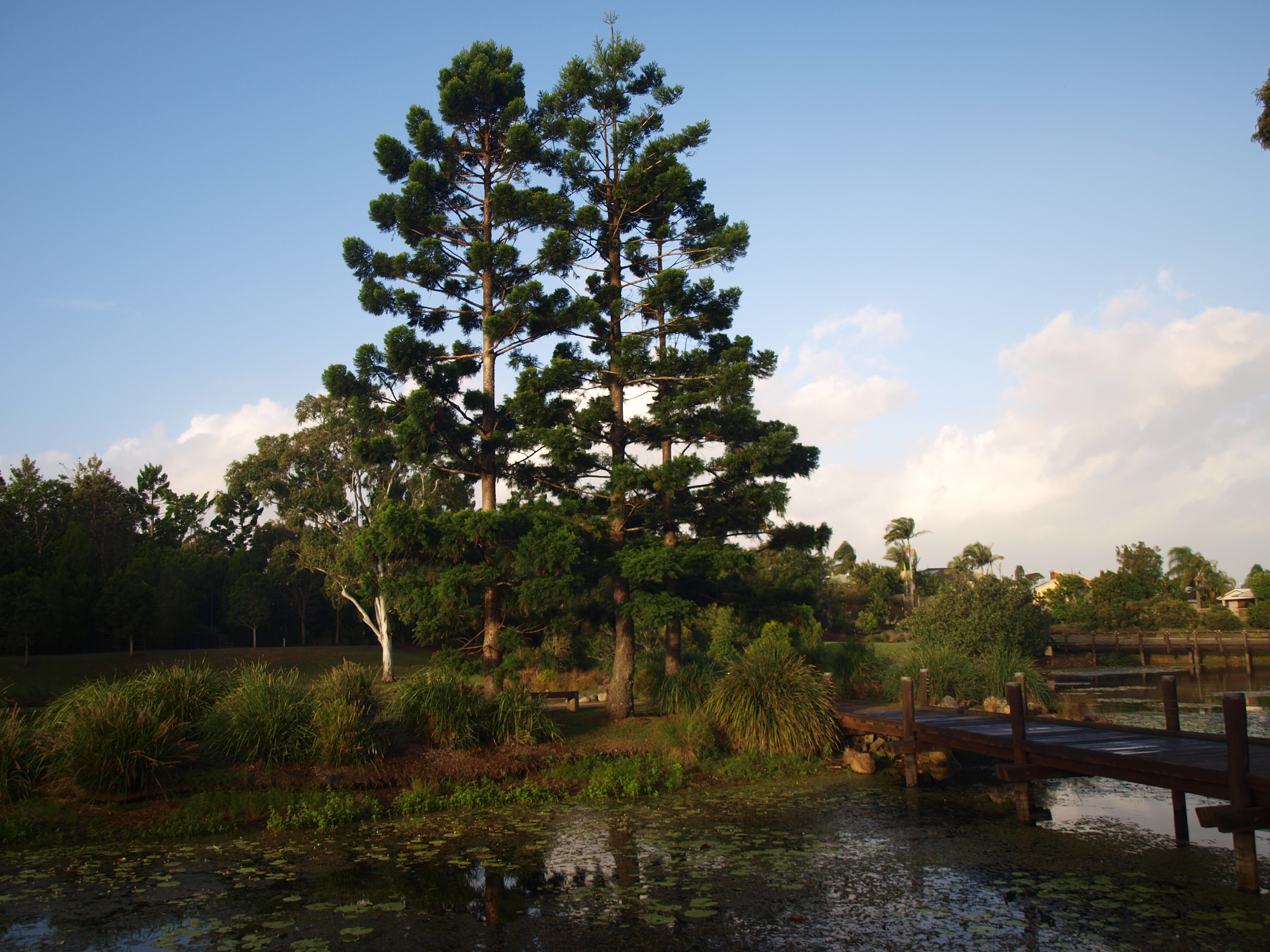

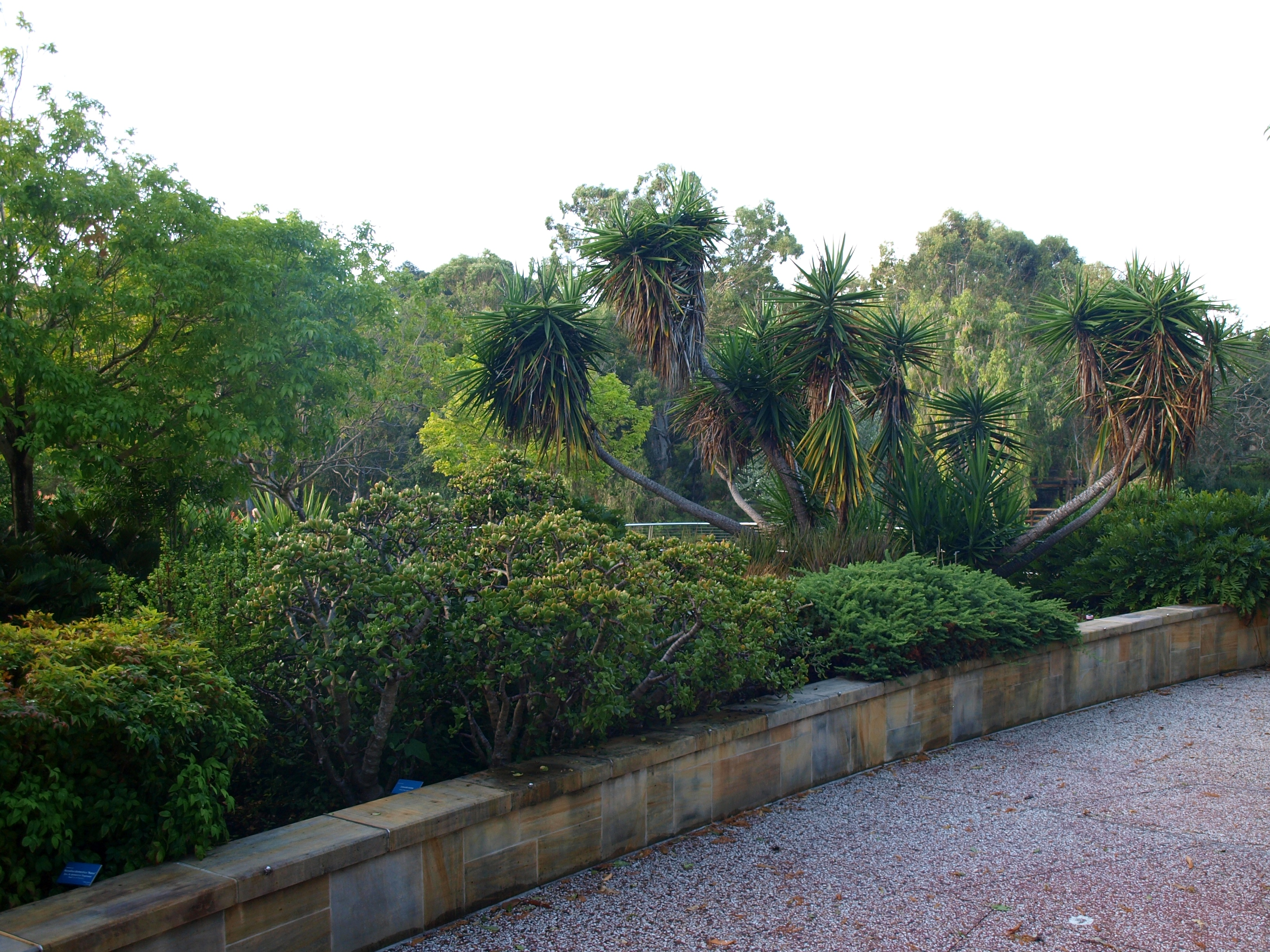

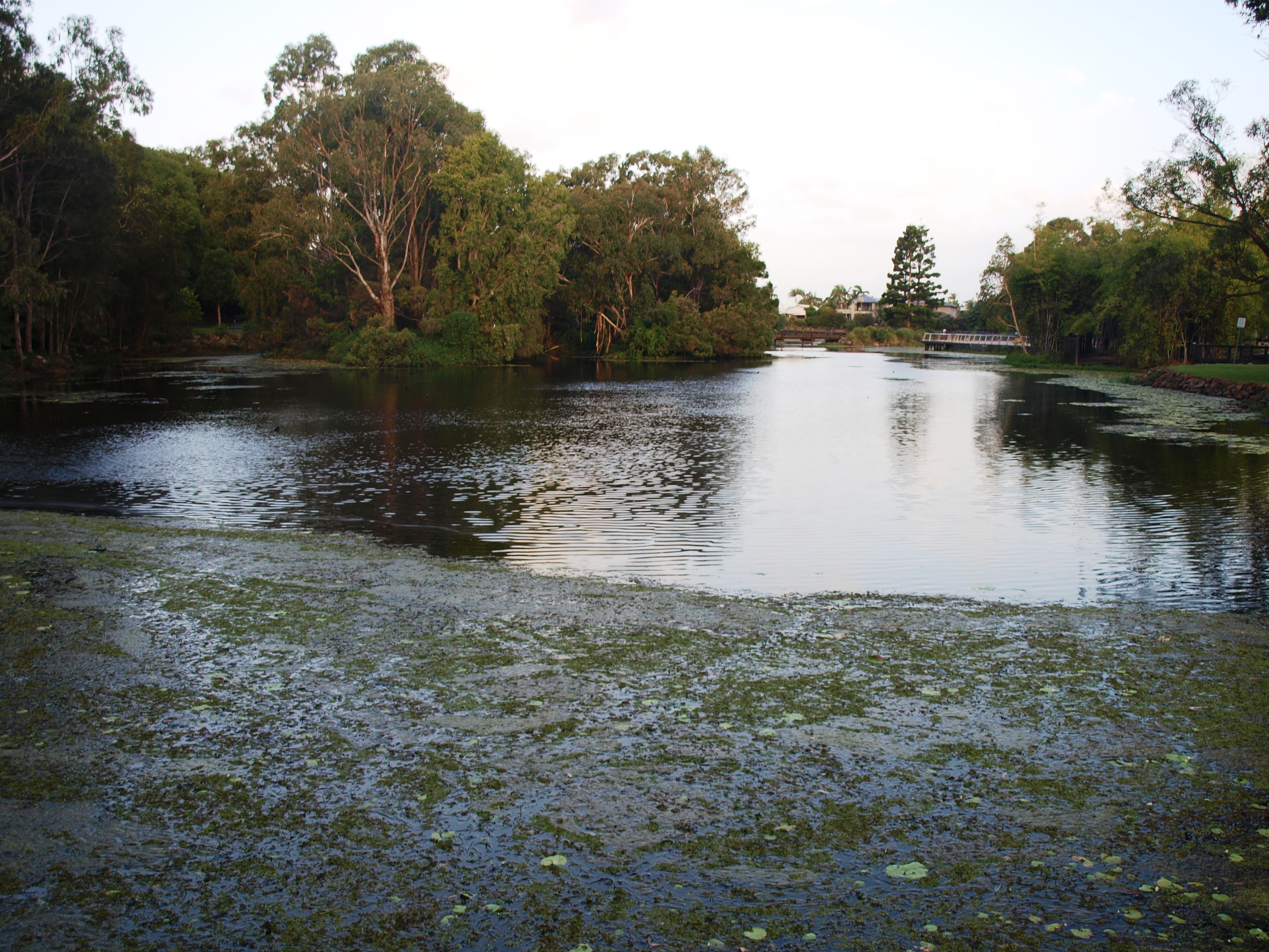

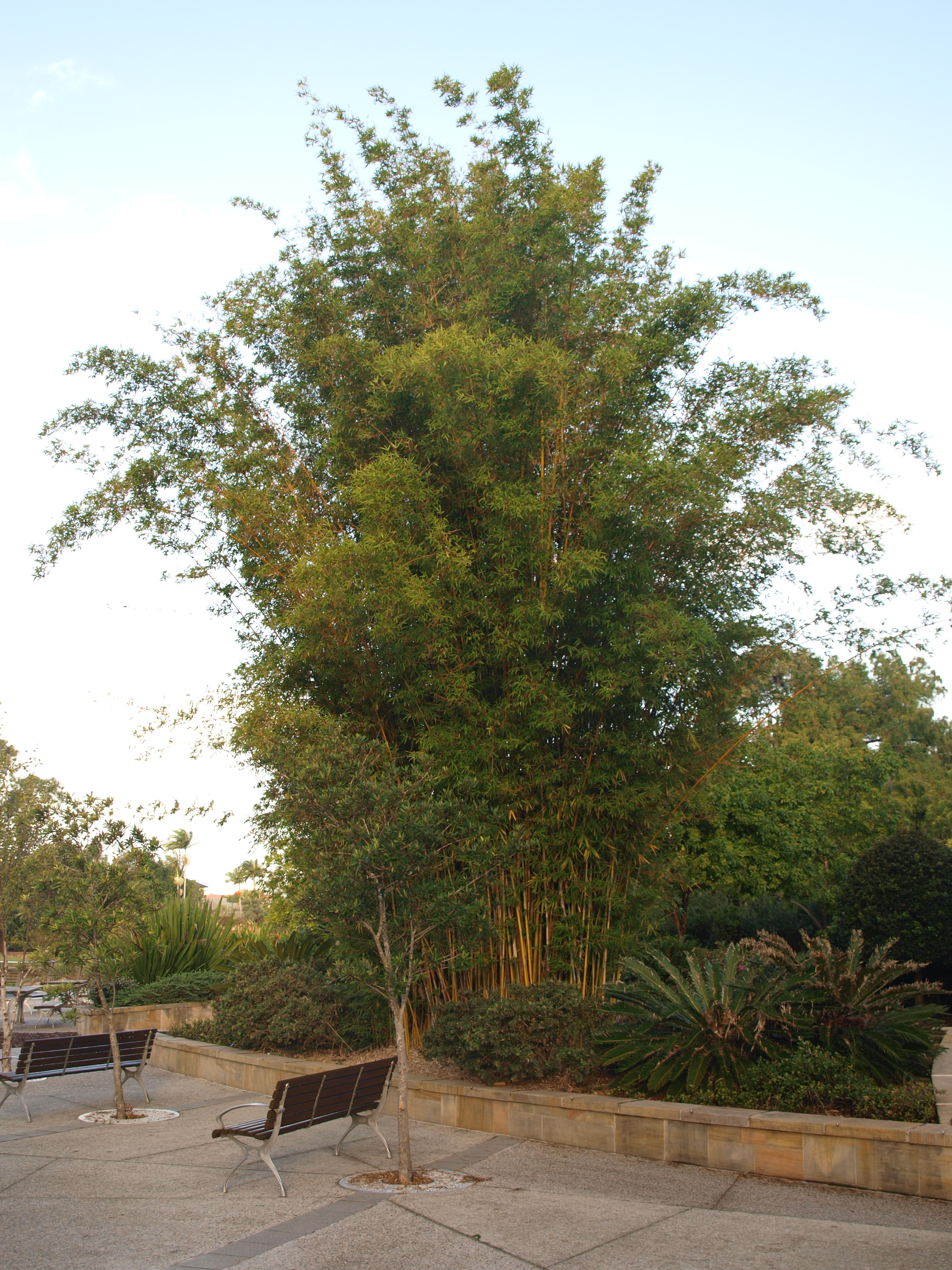

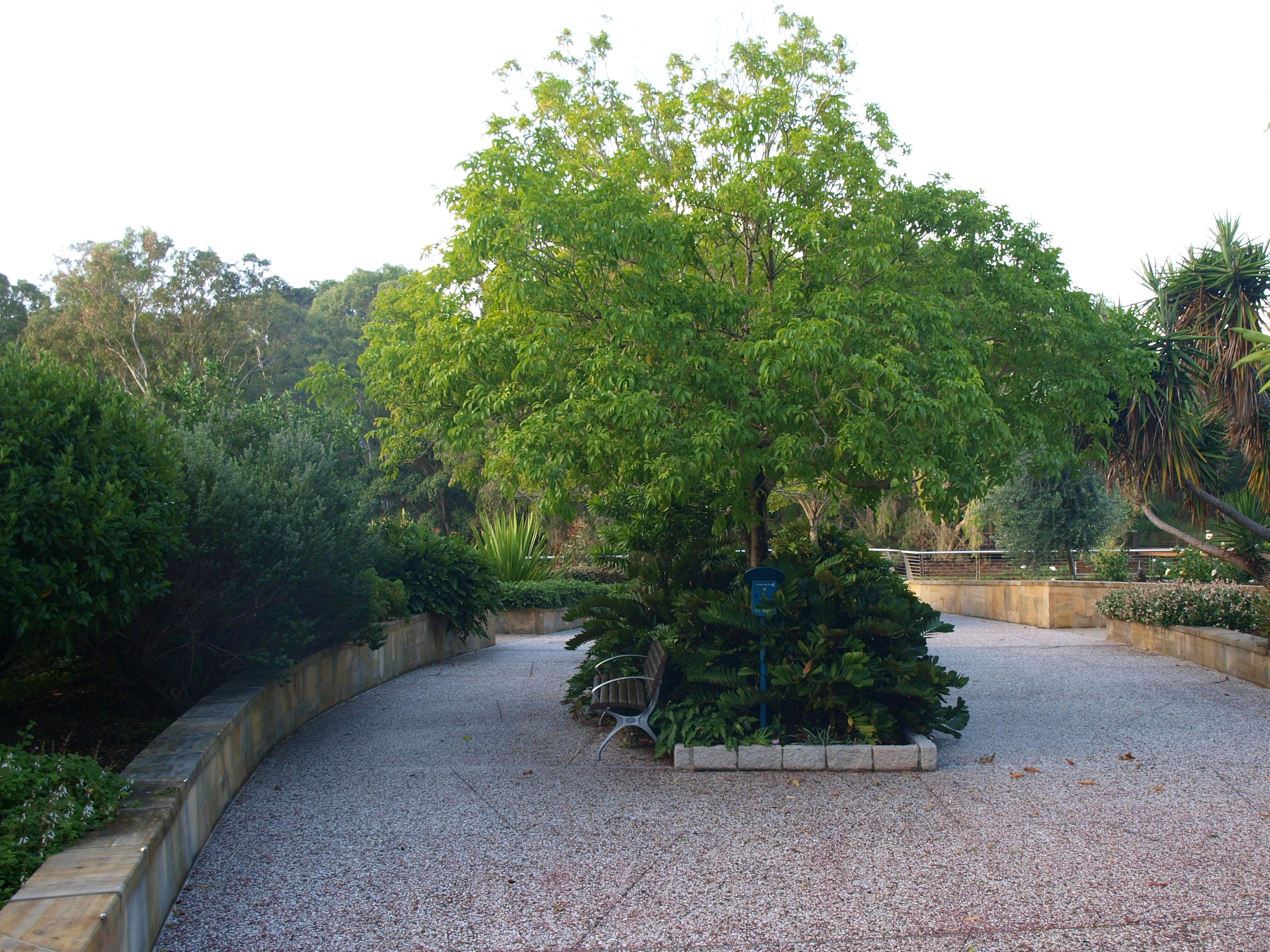

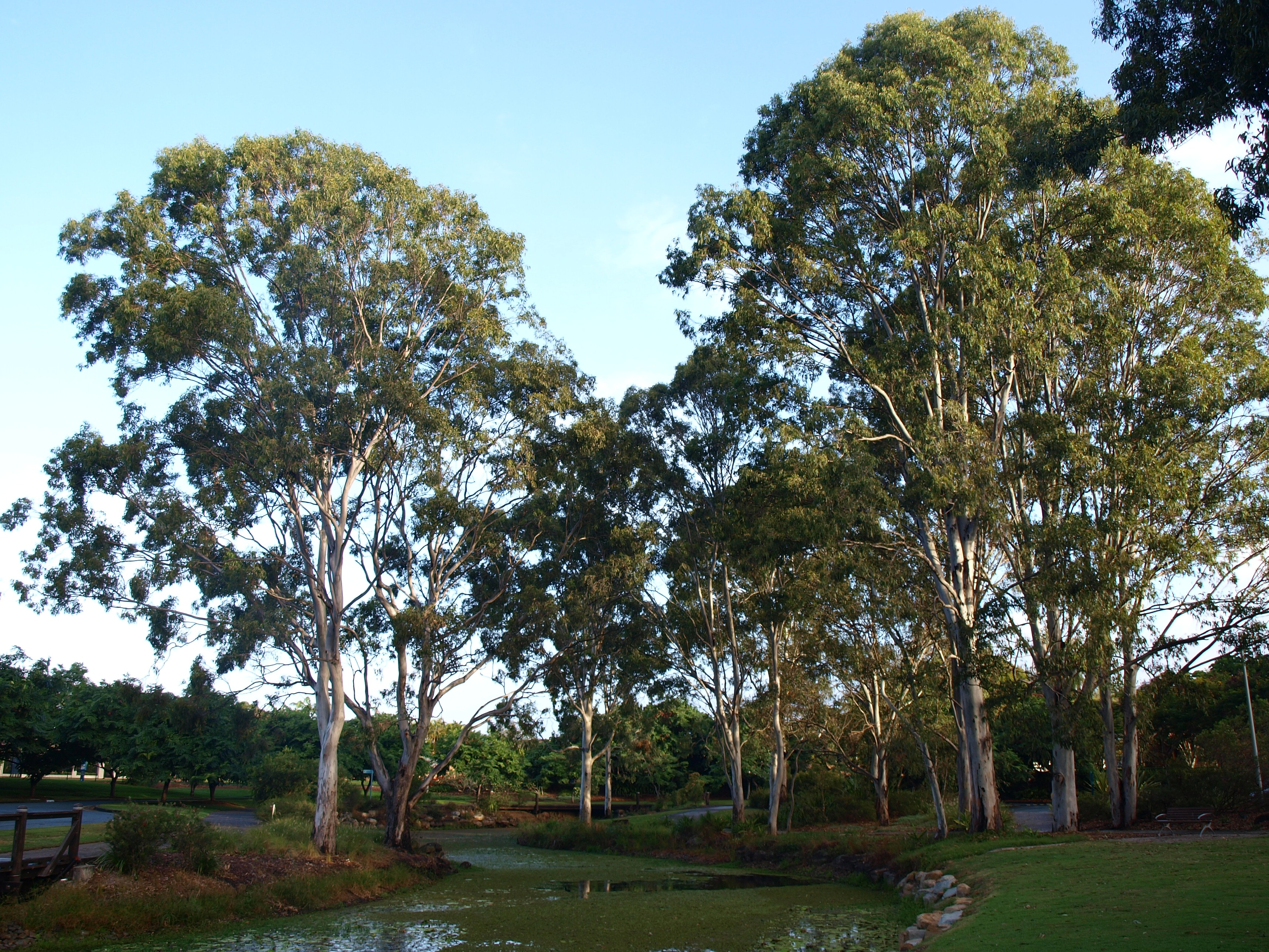

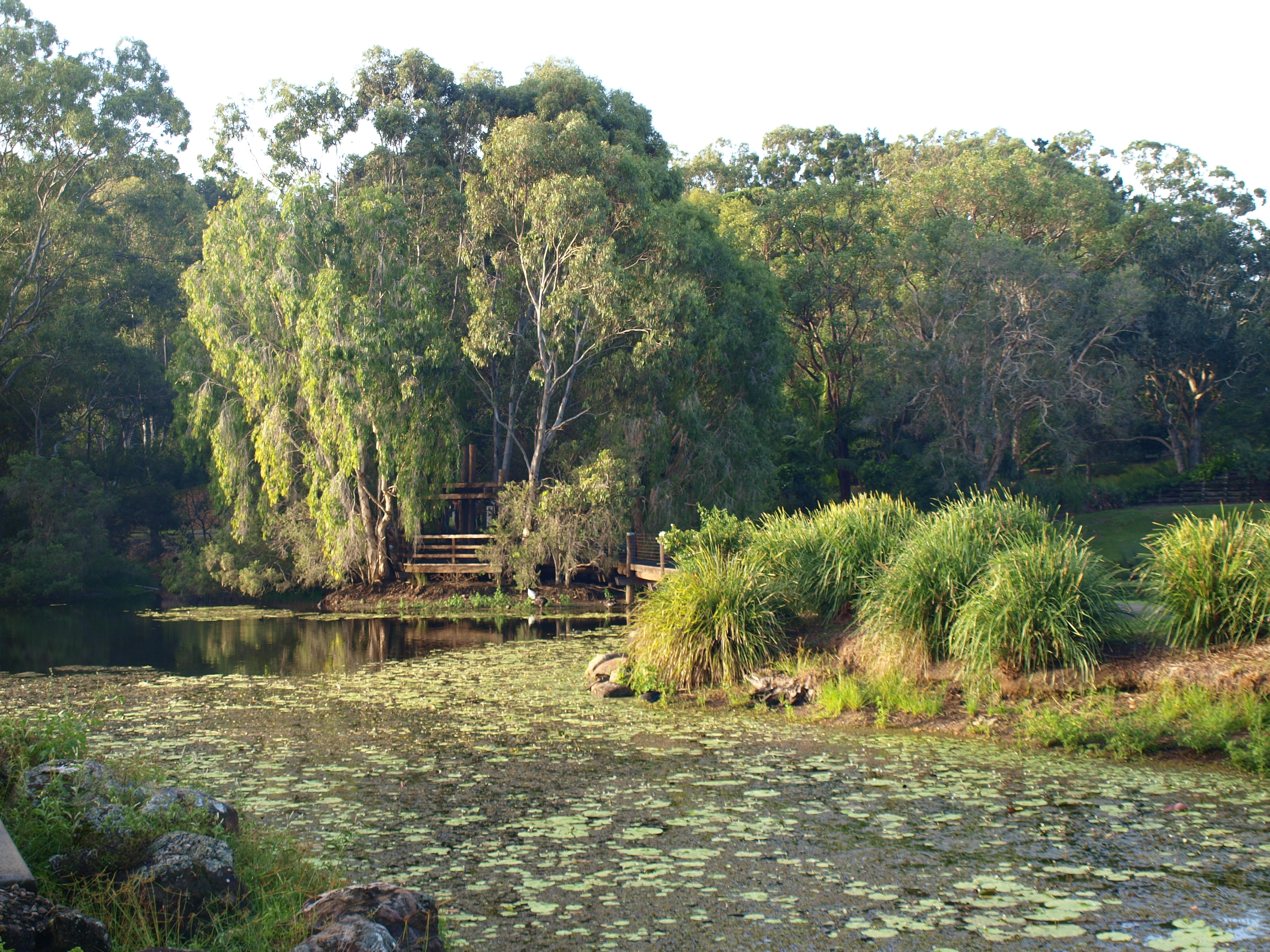

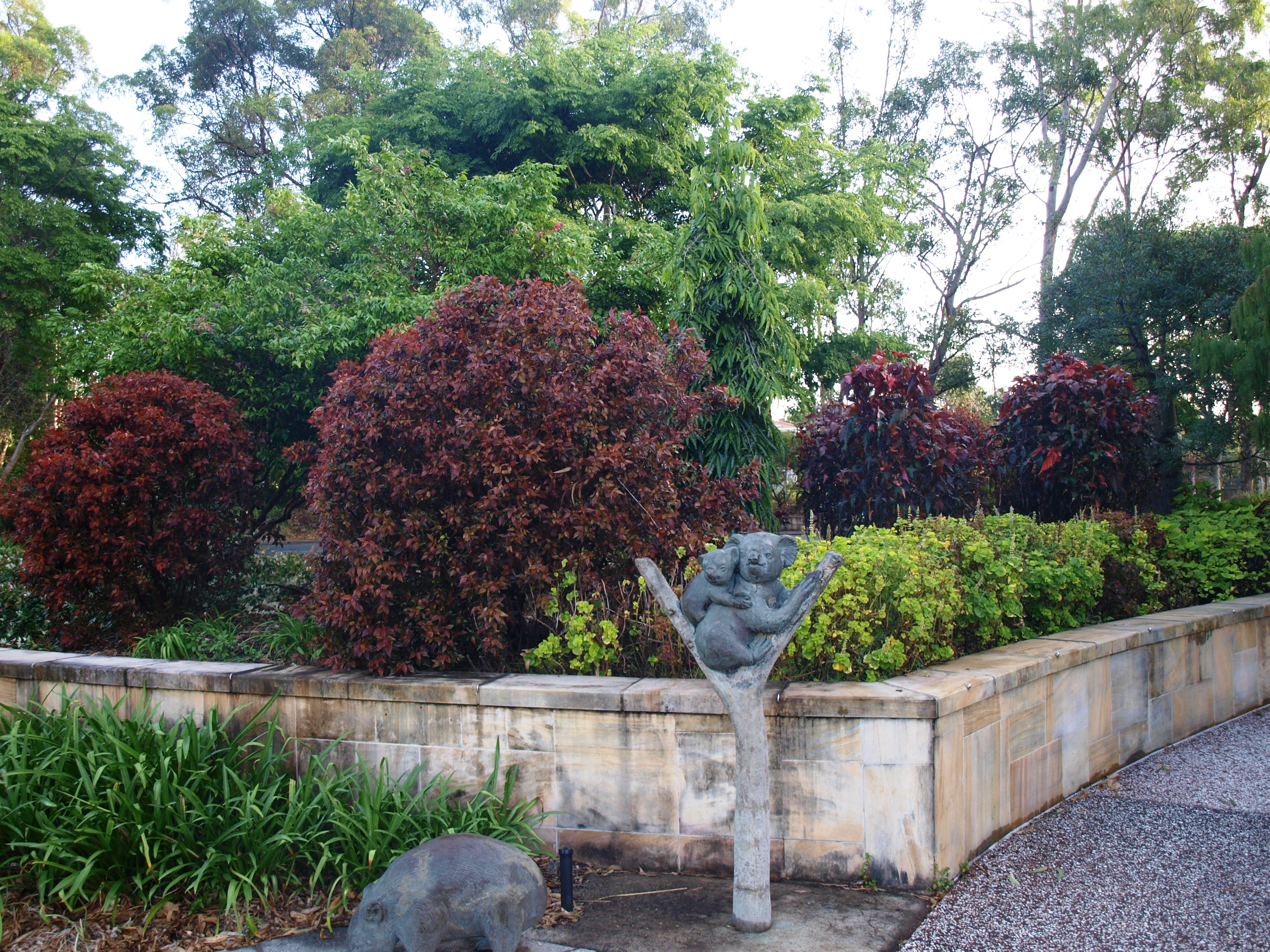

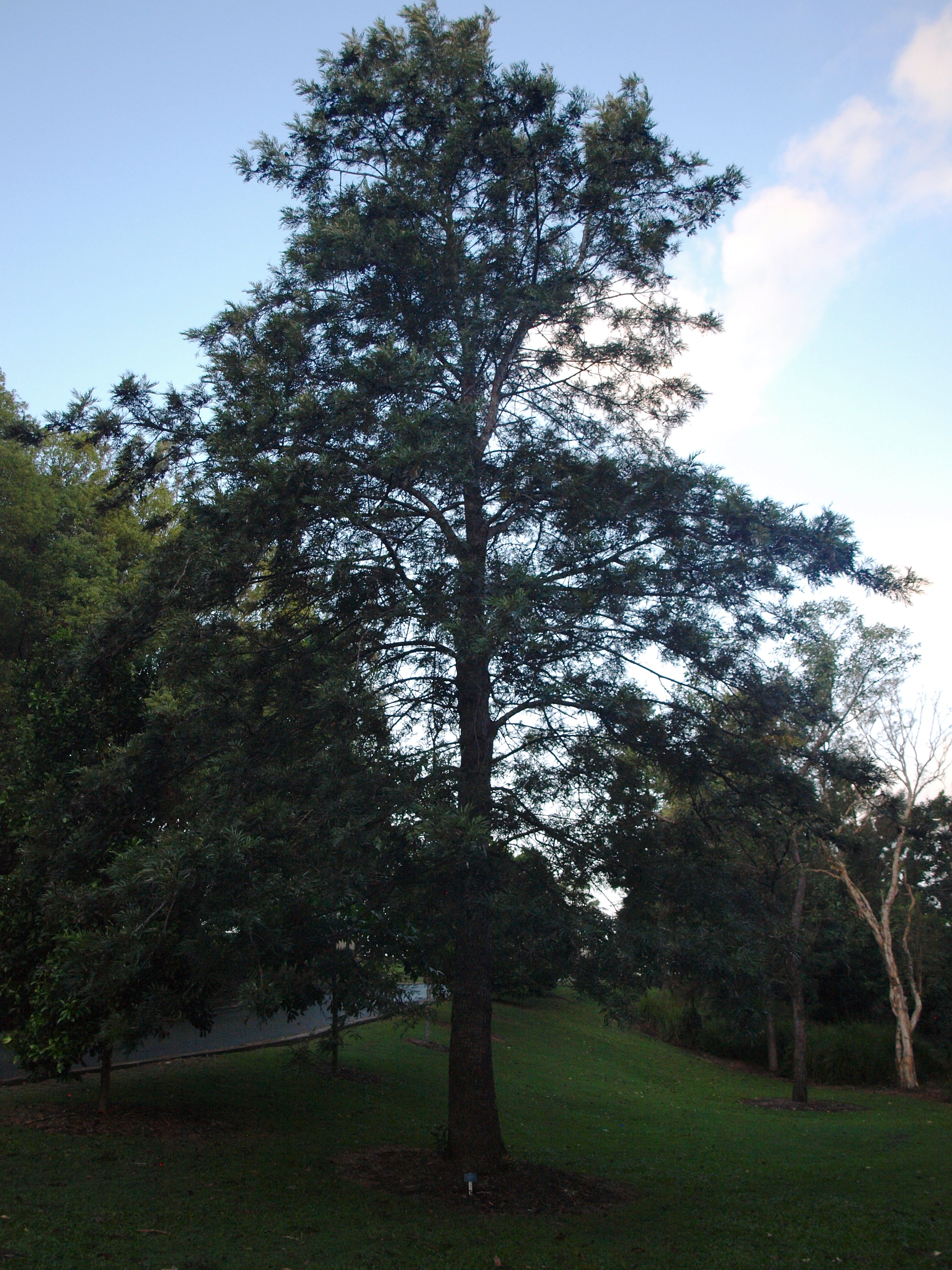

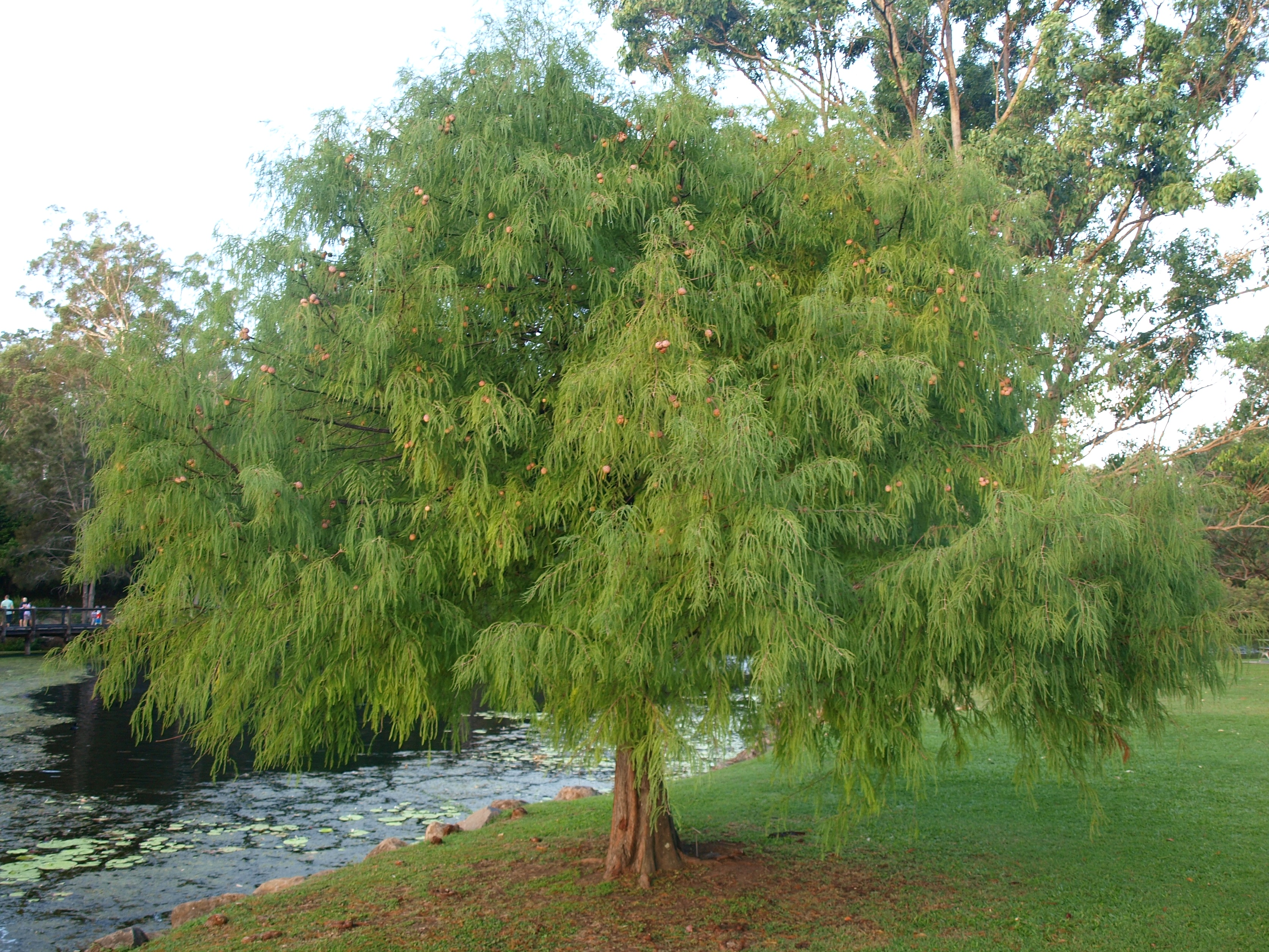

== See also ==
- List of botanical gardens in Australia
- List of botanical gardens
