= Malmsbury Botanic Gardens =

Botanic Garden in Malmsbury, Victoria, Australia

Malmsbury Botanic Garden
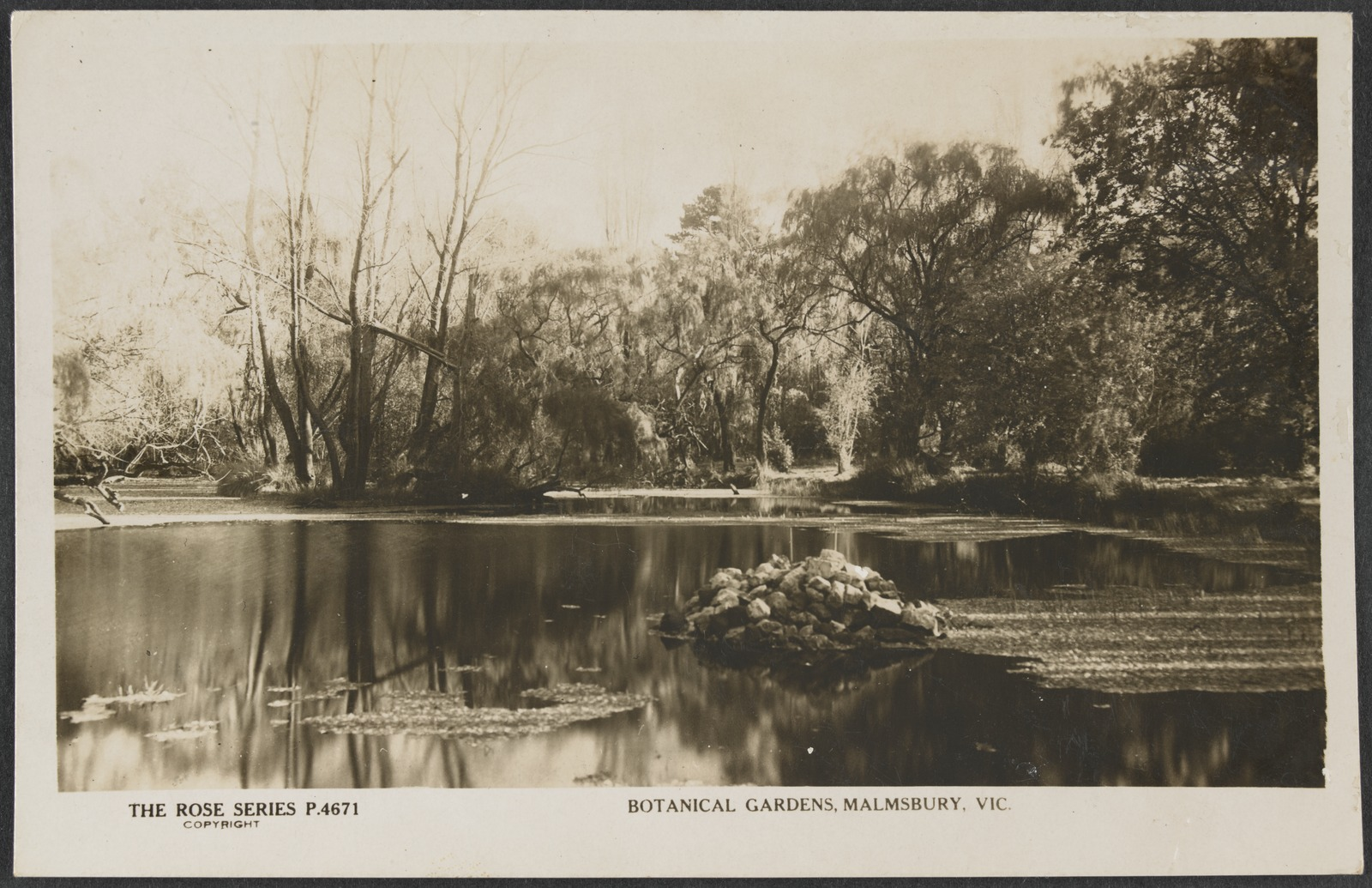
- Interactive map of Malmsbury Botanic Garden
- Type: Botanical
- Location: Malmsbury, Victoria
- Coordinates: 37°11′22″S 144°22′52″E
- Opened: 1863
- Owner: Macedon Ranges Shire
- Website: https://www.mrsc.vic.gov.au/See-Do/Parks-Gardens-Reserves/Botanic-Gardens#section-4

The Malmsbury Botanic Gardens is an Australian botanic garden in the regional town of Malmsbury, Victoria. Established in the 1850s, the garden is one of regional Victoria's earliest botanic gardens. Land was first reserved for the garden in 1855 with work commencing in 1863. In 2002 the garden was listed on the Victorian Heritage Register as an example of a nineteenth century regional garden for its design and layout, collection of plants, structures and aesthetic and social value.

The garden contains a pair of bunya bunya pines (Araucaria bidwillii) that is on the National Trust register of significant trees.
