= Heritage Park, Irvine =

City park in Irvine, California

Heritage Community Park
- Gazebo
- Interactive map of Heritage Community Park
- Location: 14301 Yale Ave. Irvine, CA 92604
- Coordinates: 33°42′00″N 117°46′42″W
- Area: 36.5 acres (14.8 hectares)
- Open: 6AM – 10PM, Daily
- Status: Open year-round
- Website: www.cityofirvine.org

Heritage Community Park is located in the city of Irvine in Orange County, California. The park sits next to Heritage Park Regional Library on the corner of Yale and Walnut Avenues, and is adjacent to Irvine High School. It was for decades recognized by its iconic wooden "water tower" slide, which stood three stories tall. Originally built in 1975, the decaying structure was removed in the mid-2000s following a redesign of the play area. The park was also known to children of the 1980s for its tractor tire maze, which was removed in the early 1990s to make way for a playground and basketball courts.
