= Heritage Park Zoological Sanctuary =

Zoo in Prescott, Arizona, US

- Interactive map of Heritage Park Zoological Sanctuary
- 34.6125°N 112.4448°W
- Date opened: 1985
- Location: Prescott, Arizona, United States
- Website: www.heritageparkzoo.org

Heritage Park Zoological Sanctuary, also known as Prescott Animal Park Association (PAPA), is a non-profit animal sanctuary in Prescott, Arizona, United States.

== History ==
Heritage Park Zoological Sanctuary (formerly the Heritage Park Zoo and earlier, the Prescott Animal Park) was established in 1988 in Prescott, Arizona by Patricia "Tricia" C. Williams Bob Matthews former board president, and several other volunteers who established a non-profit organization in 1985 called the Prescott Animal Park Association (PAPA).

Initially, the animal park was established in order to inherit the former Payson Zoo run by Randy Ferry but after the establishment of the association, Randy Ferry reconsidered and continued operations in Payson. Today, this sanctuary's motto is "Conservation through Education" and is home to over 175 native and exotic animal with a focus on non-releasable wildlife, with no other place to live out their lives.
