= Brunswick Valley Heritage Park =

Park in New South Wales, Australia

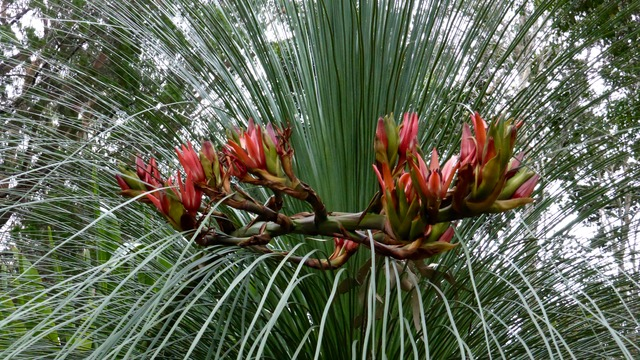
- Spear Lily, Doryanthes palmeri

- Location within New South Wales
- Interactive map of Brunswick Valley Heritage Park
- Type: Botanical
- Location: Mullumbimby, New South Wales
- Coordinates: 28.549°S 153.4982°E
- Area: 4 hectares (9.9 acres)
- Opened: 1980
- Owner: Byron Shire Council
- Operator: Brunswick Valley Landcare
- Plants: Rainforest trees of the Brunswick, Tweed and Richmond valleys

Brunswick Valley Heritage Park, also known as Mullumbimby Heritage Park, is a rainforest arboretum and recreation park located on the banks of the Brunswick River in Mullumbimby, north-eastern New South Wales, Australia. Established in 1980, the arboretum has 300 species of local rainforest trees grown from seeds and cuttings collected from the surrounding forests. It is open every day of the year and access is free.

== History ==
Mullumbimby district is in the heart of what was once the Big Scrub, 900 square kilometres of predominantly sub-tropical rainforest, on the Mount Warning caldera. Botanically, this region is known as the MacPherson–Macleay Overlap - an area of eastern Australia where tropical and temperate zones overlap: the wetter slopes typically have tropical vegetation and the drier, cooler, open parts have temperate vegetation. This area has been inhabited for many thousands of years by people of the Bundjalung nation. For the last 150 years, colonisation, forestry, and clearing for agriculture decimated the Big Scrub and other areas of lowland rainforest leaving only small remnants of the original forests on steep slopes and less accessible places.

In 1980, the Byron Flora and Fauna Conservation Society, a group of local residents led by Russ and Beryl Maslen, was given responsibility and some support by the local council to design and establish a park on what had been a weedy horse-paddock that had been earmarked for a caravan park. The aim of establishing the park was "to collect in one area a wide and representative selection of the flora native to the area".

On 7 June 1980 the mayor of Mullumbimby, Stan Robinson, planted the first tree in the arboretum, a red cedar, symbolically launching Brunswick Valley Heritage Park.

Since its inception volunteers have established and maintained the park. They have propagated and planted trees native to the local area, and the arboretum now boasts 300 local species, including 40 species with a conservation status.

Management of the park is now overseen by Brunswick Valley Landcare.

== Location ==
Brunswick Valley Heritage Park is a 4 hectares (9.9 acres) riverside park in the township of Mullumbimby. Access to the arboretum is from Brunswick Terrace and Tyagarah Street; access to the children's playground is via Mill Street on the north side of town.

== Gallery ==
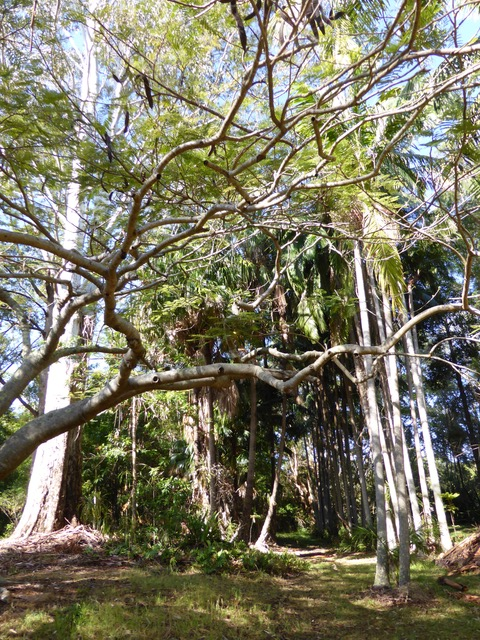
Bangalow palms, 2014

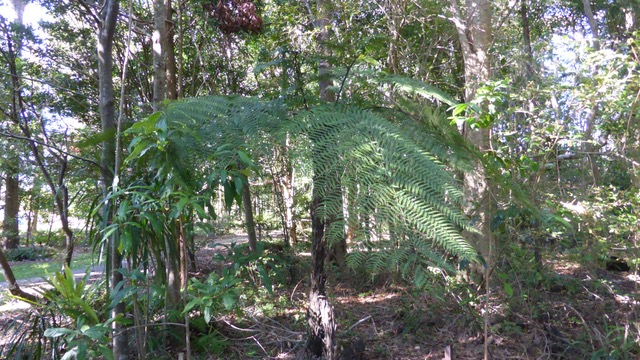
Tree fern, 2015

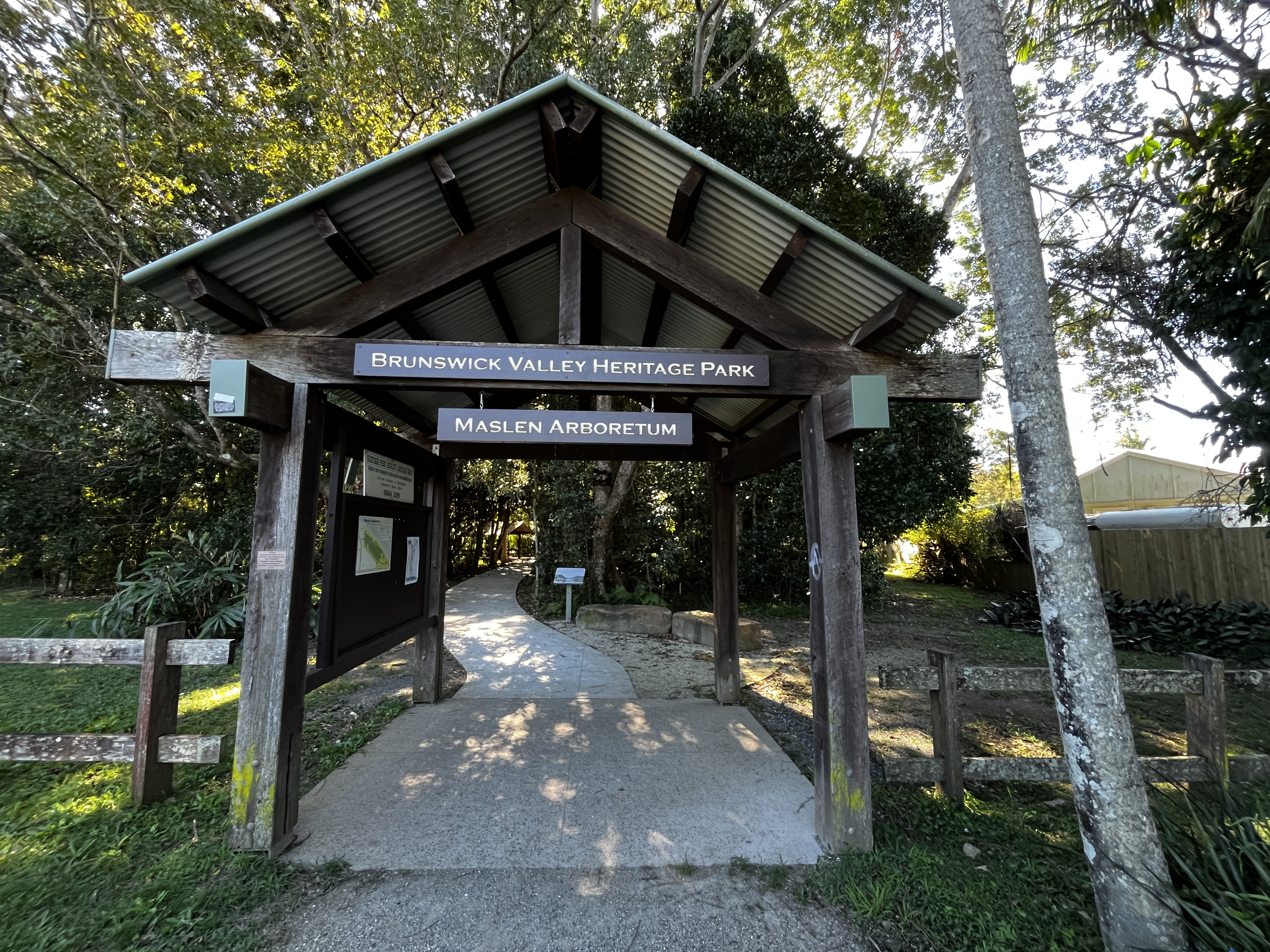
Entry to the Brunswick Valley Heritage Park, 2025

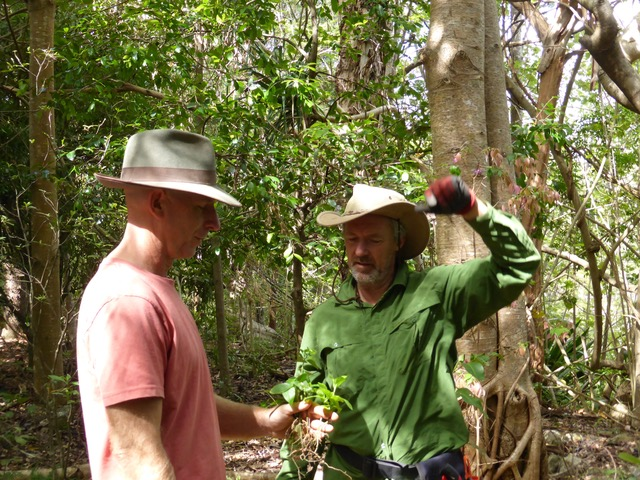
Volunteers, 2014

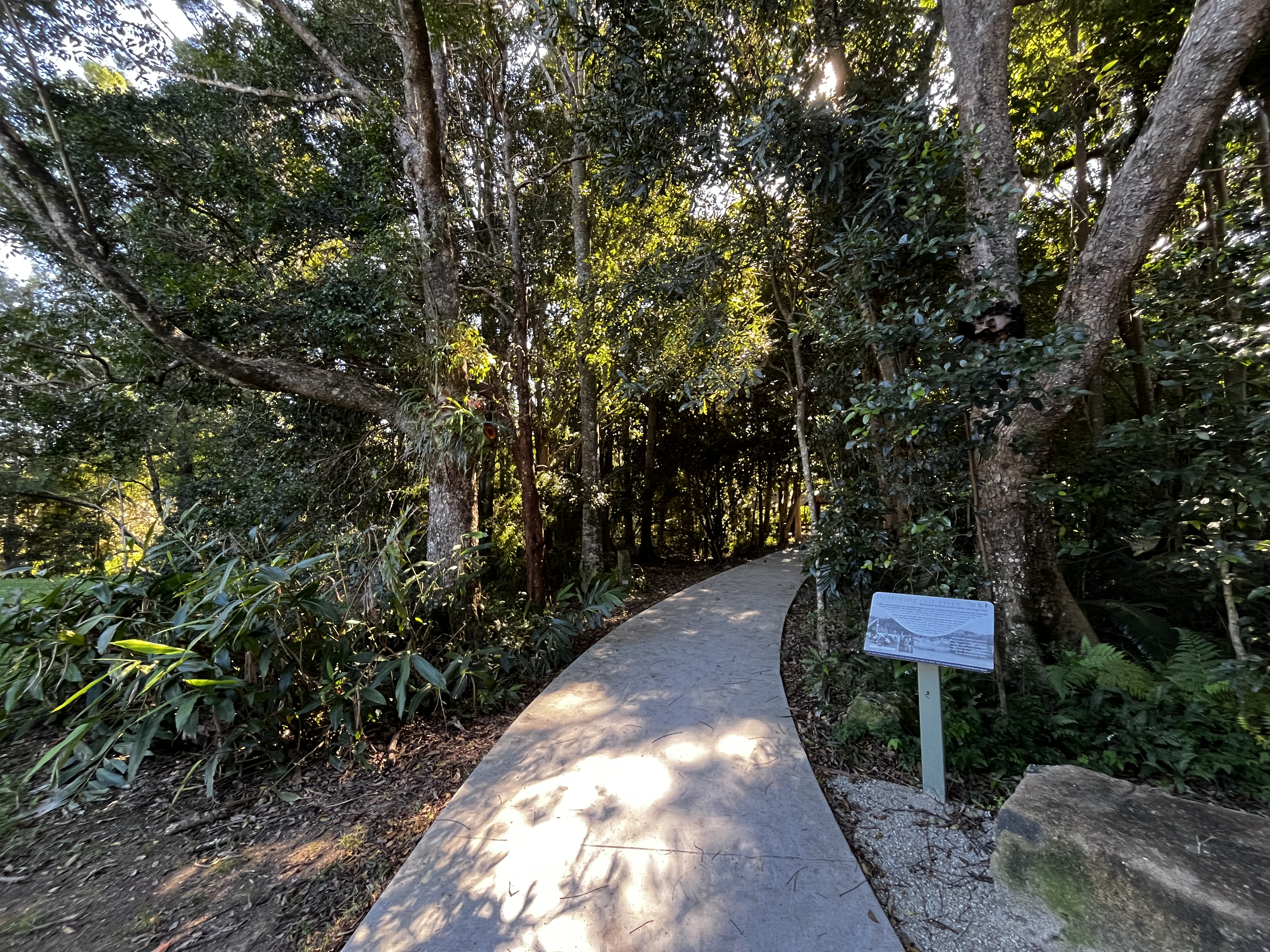
Pathway at the Brunswick Valley Heritage Park, 2025

== See also ==
- List of Australian place names of Aboriginal origin
- List of botanical gardens in Australia
- Northern Rivers
