= Demesne Farm Minor Arboretum =

Botanic garden in New South Wales, Australia

Coordinates: 32.2545°S 152.4531°E

Demesne Farm Minor Arboretum is a botanic garden located in the Mid North Coast region of New South Wales.

== Features ==
90% of the plants in the garden are Australian flora featuring species of the Callistemon genus.

== History ==
The Arboretum was established in 1983 by M. Sewell.
