= Tasmanian Bushland Garden =

Coordinates: 42.6078°S 147.7170°E

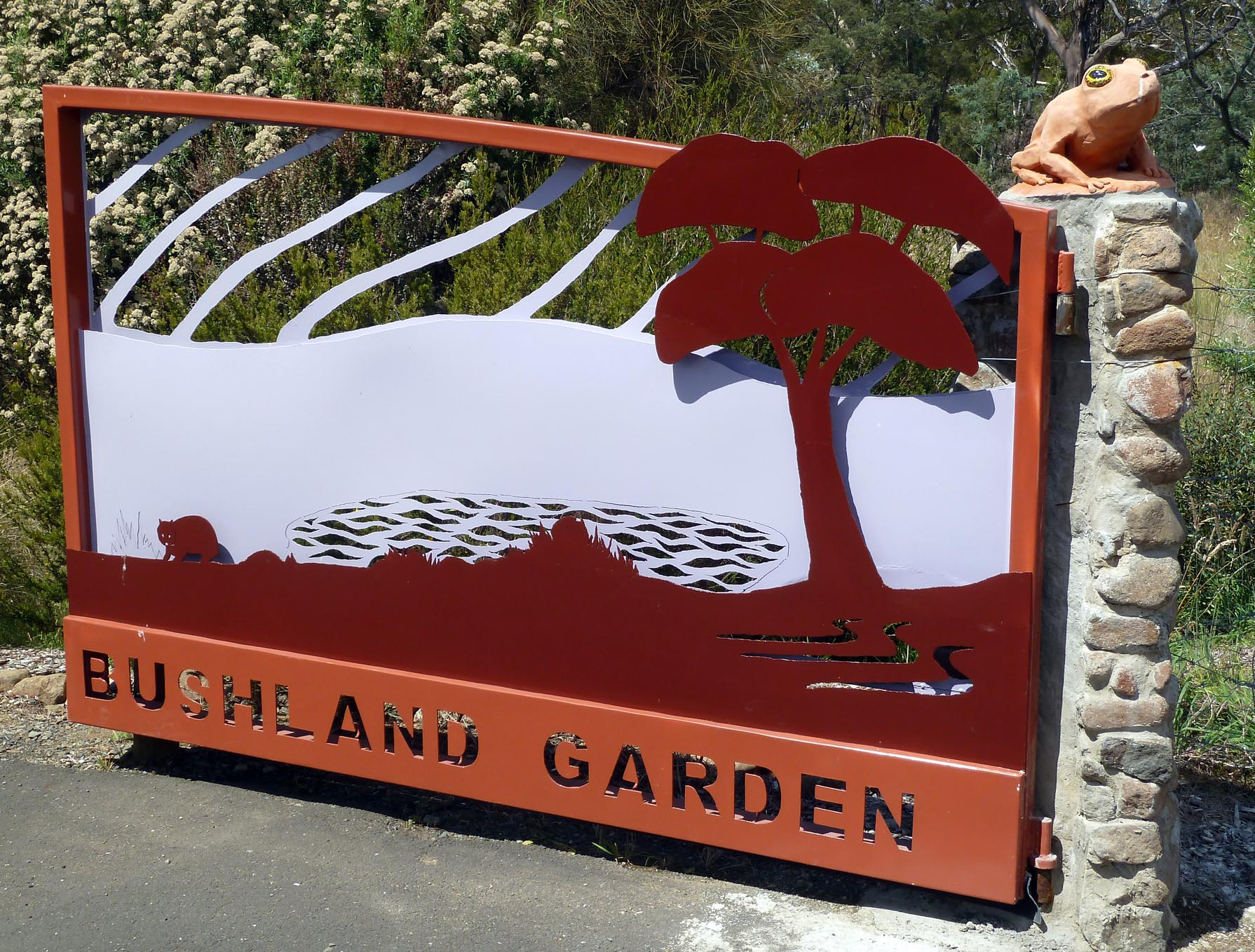
Gate to the Tasmanian Bushland Garden

The Tasmanian Bushland Garden is a small botanical garden concentrating on native Tasmanian plants and especially those of the dry sclerophyll forest and scrub habitats in south east Tasmania. Opened in April 2010 by Senator Christine Milne, it is maintained largely through the effort of volunteers. The garden is open to the public on most days during daylight hours for free. It is located six kilometres west of Buckland, Tasmania besides the Tasman Highway.

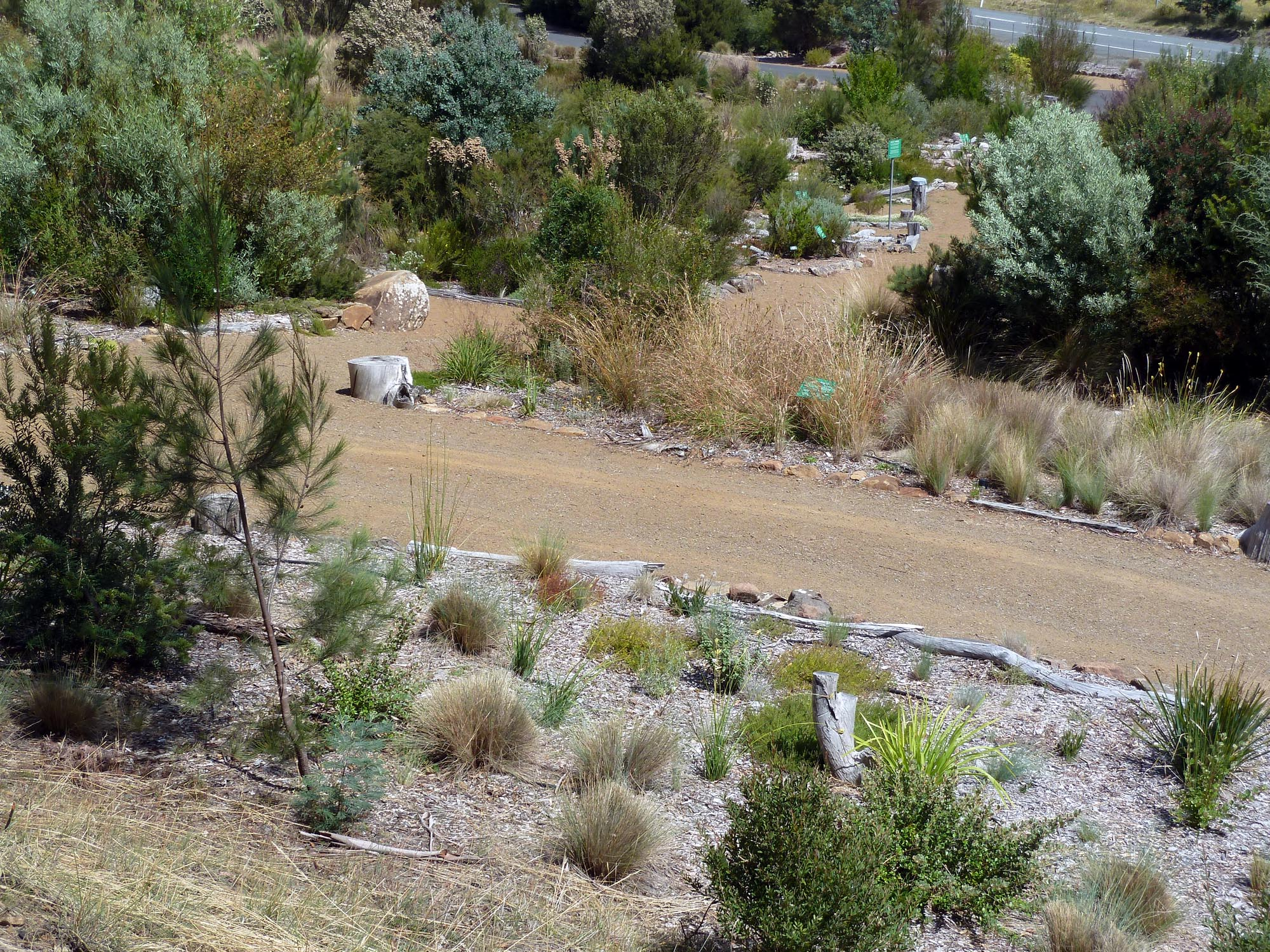
Part of the Tasmanian bushland garden - plant beds

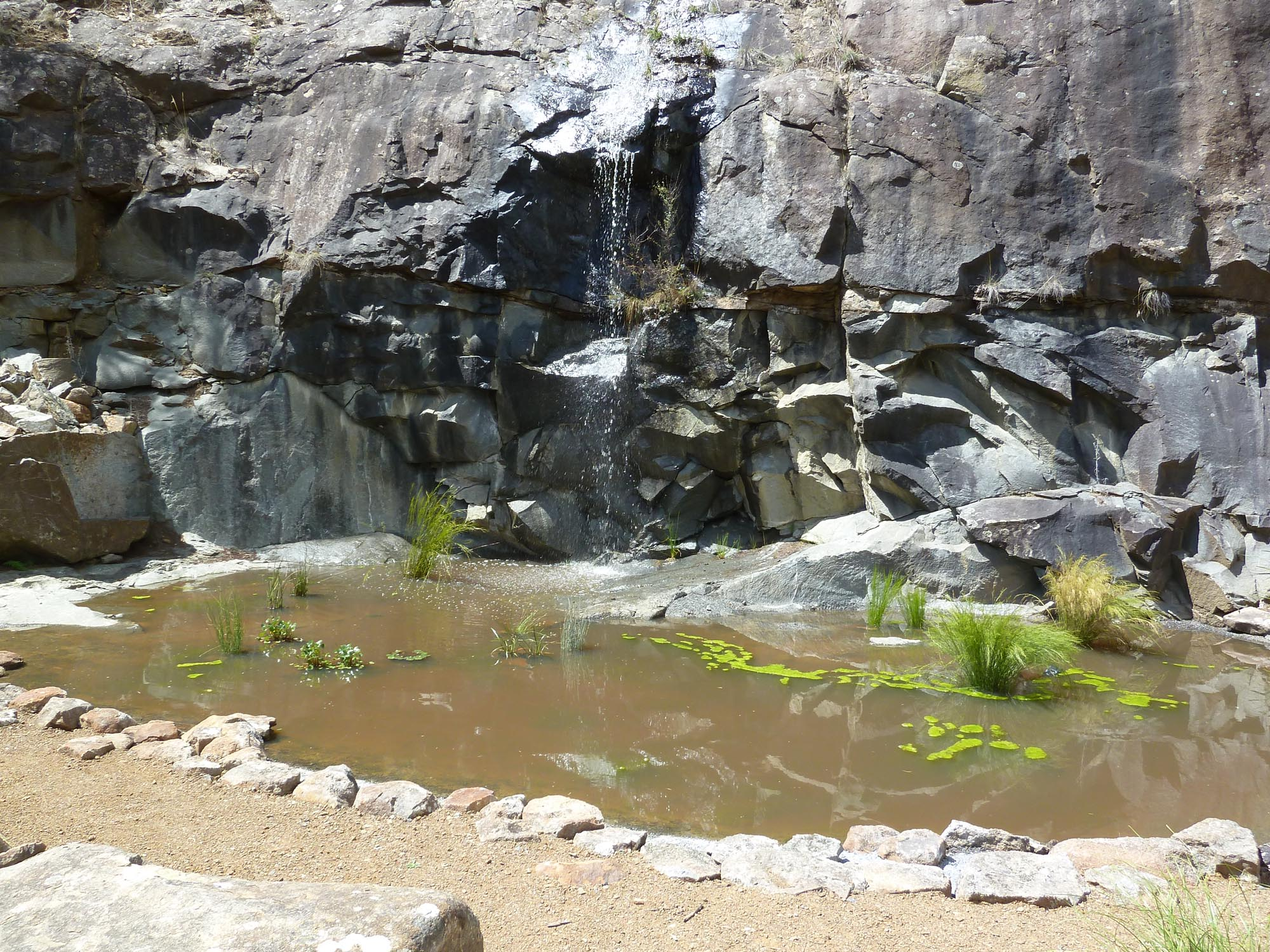
Waterfall and pond feature of the Tasmanian Bushland Garden
