= Iron-grass Natural Temperate Grassland of South Australia =

Ecological community in South Australia

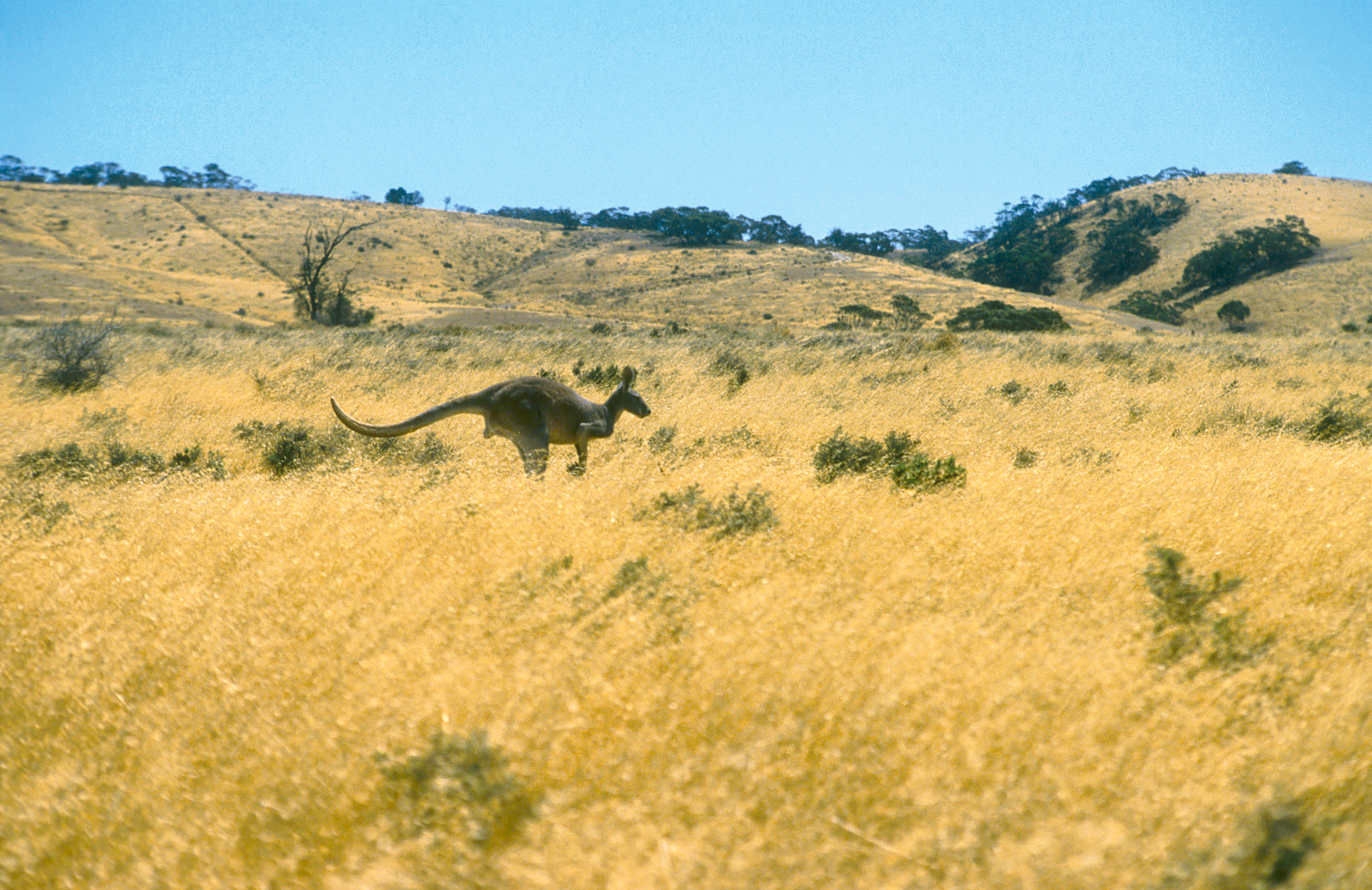
- A sloped grassy field near Burra

Ecology
- Realm: Australasia
- Biome: Temperate grasslands, savannas, and shrublands
- Borders: Mount Lofty woodlands; Eyre Yorke Block; Murray Darling Depression

Geography
- Area: 50 km^{2} (19 sq mi)
- Country: Australia
- Elevation: 50–500 metres (160–1,640 ft)
- Coordinates: 33°50′0″S 138°36′0″E
- Climate type: Mediterranean climate (Csa); Semi-arid climate (BSk)
- Soil types: Loam, clay

The Iron-grass Natural Temperate Grassland of South Australia is a temperate grassland in the southeast of South Australia that stretches from Orroroo in the north, to Strathalbyn in the south, just straddling the eastern fringes of Adelaide's Mount Lofty Ranges. Listed as Critically Endangered under the EPBC Act, the grasslands predominantly feature Iron-grasses (Lomandra species).

The community is found in smooth slopes of low-level hills, and in wide valleys with elevations from 50 m (160 ft) to more than 500 m (1,600 ft) above sea level, covering most of the Mid North area and Clare Valley. They are distinguished from other grasslands of southeastern Australia because they are frequently dominated by Lomandra species (Iron-grasses) which are tussocks in the Asparagaceae (Note: Previously, Lomandra species were considered part of the Liliaceae family, but are now in Asparagaceae.) family, rather than actual grasses.

== Geography ==
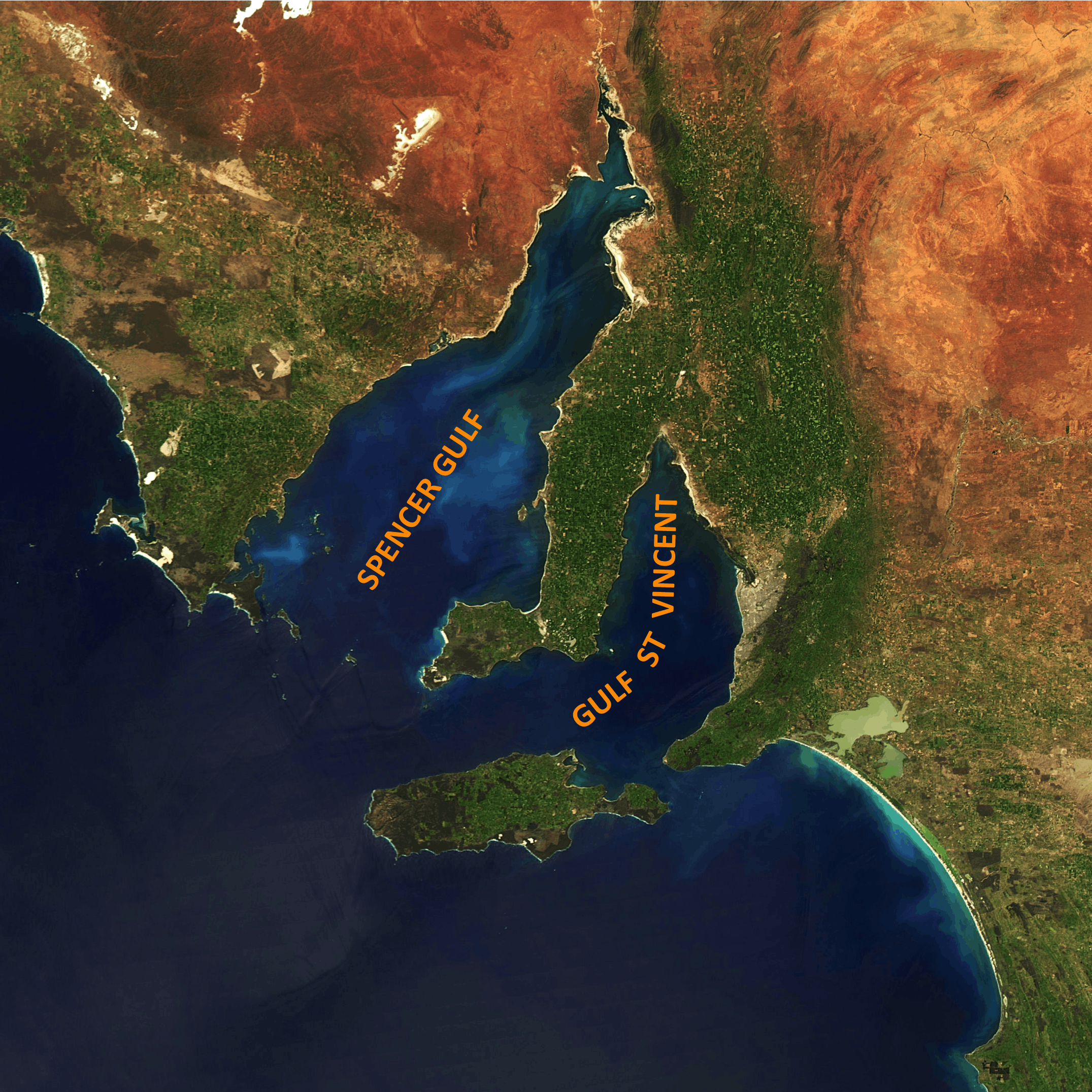
The region lies eastwards of, and in parallel with, Gulf St Vincent.

The vegetation community is mostly found within the Flinders-Lofty Block Bioregion, with minor presence in the Kanmantoo, Eyre Yorke Block and Murray Darling Depression Bioregions. The community once spread over an area estimated at 750,000 to 1,000,000 hectares (1,900,000 to 2,500,000 acres) between Clare and Burra to Jamestown, Peterborough and to west of Carrieton, but has since been reduced to around 5,000 hectares due to agriculture and land clearing. 780 hectares have been used in conservation parks and private heritage agreements, with minor parts remaining in several reserves, including road and rail reserves, gullies, ridges and on slopes of hills. The residue patches alter in size from less than 1 hectare to large blocks of 100 ha or more.

They area distributed in the transition zone between the higher rainfall woodlands and the drier Mallee areas at the base of the eastern Mount Lofty Ranges to the Mallee, and from Callington northwards to Terowie. The mean annual rainfall ranges from 280–600 mm (11–24 in) across the community with a rainfall peak in winter. The distribution of the Iron-grass Natural Temperate Grassland is located within various Aboriginal Nations, including lands of the Ngarrindjeri, Peramangk, Kaurna, Narrunga, Nukunu and Ngadjuri people.

== Ecology ==
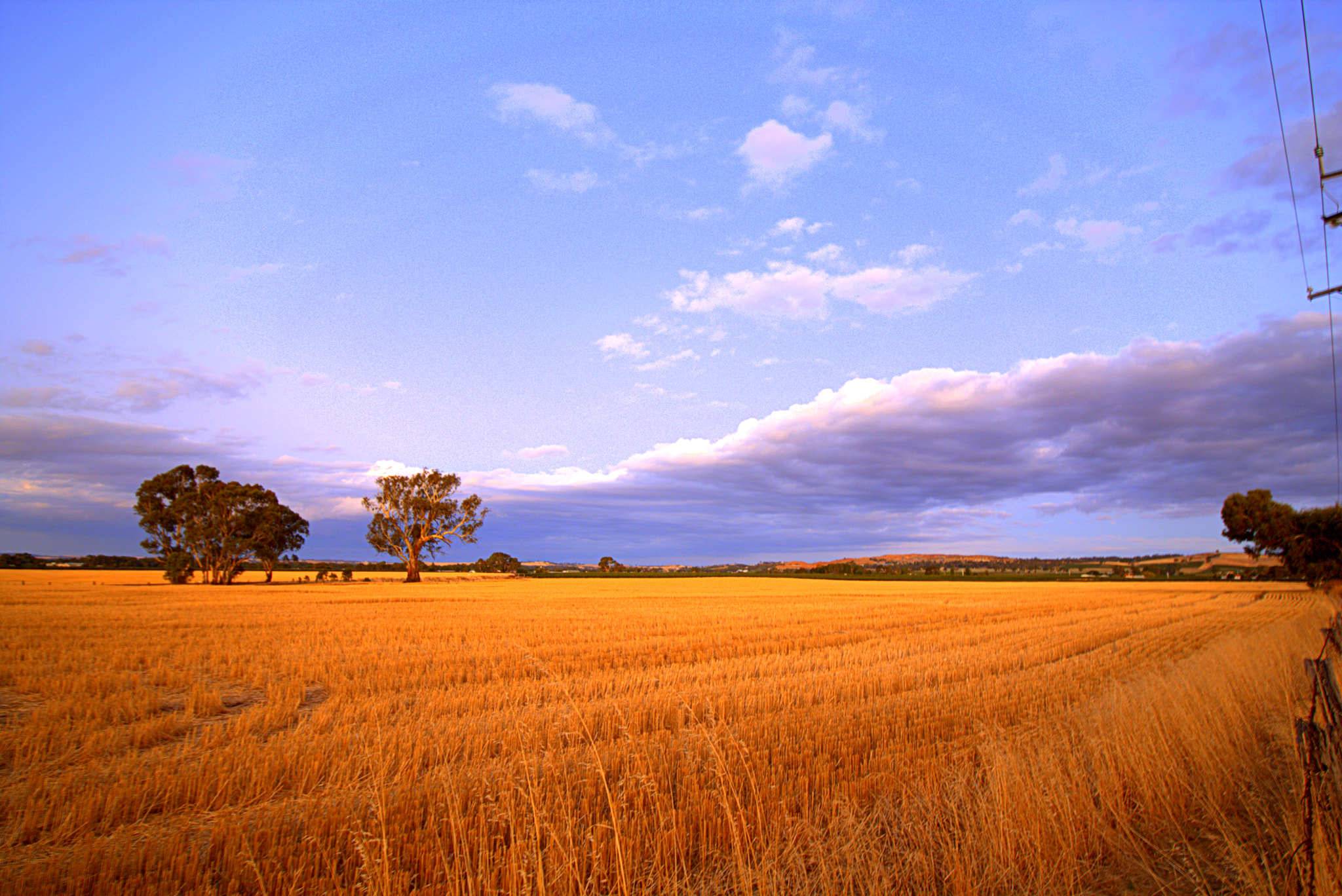
Wheat fields in Nuriootpa

In the community, Lomandra multiflora and Lomandra effusa predominantly occur alongside perennial, tussock-forming native grasses, which cover 70 per cent of the area. Grasses include Austrodanthonia and Austrostipa species, and as well as Austrodanthonia tenuior and Dianella longifolia. Wildflowers and forbs include Acanthocladium dockeri, Caladenia colorata, Dodonaea procumbens, Eryngium ovinum, Swainsona behriana, Arthropodium strictum, Triptilodiscus pygmaeus, Chrysocephalum apiculatum, Convolvulus erubescens, Goodenia pinnatifida, Bulbine bulbosa, Einadia nutans, Wurmbea dioica, Velleia paradoxa, Swainsona behriana, Vittadinia gracilis and Wahlenbergia luteola.

Trees and gangling shrubs are devoid to sparse and would cover less than 10 per cent of the community, in addition to being mostly associated with contiguous woodlands. The sparse tree species are Allocasuarina verticillata, Acacia pycnantha, Eucalyptus leucoxylon, Eucalyptus odorata and Eucalyptus porosa, and the few shrubs include Bursaria spinosa, Enchylaena tomentosa, Eutaxia microphylla and Maireana brevifolia. These grasslands are possibly traced from dissipated grassy woodlands, which also occur in the dispersion range of Iron-grass Natural Temperate Grassland. The region features loam to clay loam soils usually found on soft to precipitous slopes of hills and stony ridgelines.

=== Animals ===
Mammals, birds, reptiles, insects, spiders and other invertebrates influence the necessary ecological procedure of the grassland, with Macropus fuliginosus, Chalinolobus gouldii, Chalinolobus morio, Tadarida australis, Dromaius novaehollandiae, Aprasia pseudopulchella, Aprasia pseudopulchella, Tiliqua adelaidensis, Pedionomus torquatus and Eolophus roseicapillus being the most recorded species. The state vulnerable Ardeotis australis, Pedionomus torquatus and Trapezites luteus have also been observed in the Grassland. Birds include Cincloramphus cruralis, Corvus mellori, Pedionomus torquatus, Aquila audax, Cracticus tibicen, Ocyphaps lophotes, Phaps chalcoptera, Coturnix pectoralis and Turnix velox.

== See also ==
- Adelaide Plains
