= Hans Hermann Behr =

American physician

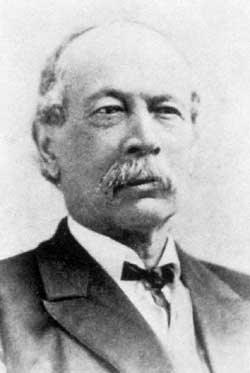
- Hans Hermann Behr
- Born: 18 August 1818; Köthen (Anhalt), Germany
- Died: 6 March 1904 (aged 85); San Francisco, California
- Citizenship: German
- Scientific career
- Fields: botany, medicine, anthropology, entomology
- Author abbrev. (botany): Behr

Hans Hermann Behr (August 18, 1818, Köthen – March 6, 1904, San Francisco) was a German-American doctor, entomologist and botanist. At the time of his death, the San Francisco Chronicle reported that he was "reckoned among mental giants" and that he was "an authority of world-wide prominence" in many branches of science.

== Early life ==
Behr came from a prominent family with connections to the administration of the principality of Köthen (also Koethen, Goethen or Colthen). He attended schools in Köthen and Zerbst where he studied Greek, Latin, Hebrew and mathematics. As a boy he developed an interest in natural history, including collecting birds' eggs. In 1837 he began his study of medicine, first at the Martin Luther University of Halle-Wittenberg and later at the Humboldt University of Berlin where he graduated in 1843 as Doctor of Medicine. (In 1898, on his eightieth birthday, he was given the unusual honour of having his degree renewed by the University of Berlin at the recommendation of Rudolf Virchow.) Whilst at Wittenberg he had developed an interest in botany and a passing interest in the sport of duelling which left him with scars on his face.

== Time in Australia ==
Encouraged by his friends and mentors, Alexander von Humboldt and Karl Ritter, Behr left Bremerhaven on 27 May 1844 bound for Australia to study botany and entomology, in particular insects in the orders Lepidoptera and Coleoptera. Arriving at Port Adelaide on 12 September 1844, he travelled to the Lutheran settlement at Bethanian and spent 13 months in the colony of South Australia exploring areas around Gawler, Lyndoch, the Barossa Ranges and the Light, Murray and Onkaparinga rivers. He collected insect and botanical specimens, sending reports back to Europe. He also lived with Aboriginal people, learning their languages and studying their customs.

== Return to Germany ==
On 9 October 1845, Behr left the colony, the only passenger apart from the captain's wife, on a small boat, the Heerjeboy Rustomjee Patell, heading for Amsterdam via Batavia. The boat was attacked by pirates near Bali but the Patell eventually made it safely to Cape Town then Amsterdam, arriving on 19 May 1846. He spent the next two years in Germany and had papers on the insects of the Adelaide area published in Entomologische Zeitung Stettin and on Australian flora in Linnaea: Ein Journal für die Botanik in ihrem ganzen Umfange. The next 115 pages of the latter journal are devoted to descriptions of 200 plants by Dietrich von Schlechtendal, collected by Behr.

In 1848, the political situation in Germany was tense and Behr himself was becoming involved in socialist activities. To avoid the young man's becoming more involved, Behr's father arranged for his son to return to Australia, travelling as ship's surgeon to Adelaide via Rio de Janeiro.

== Return to Australia ==
Behr was back in South Australia on 6 November 1848 and soon returned to Bethanien. He stayed in South Australia for about one year, during which time he met the Victorian Government botanist, Ferdinand von Mueller and William Hillebrand, who was later to publish Flora of the Hawaiian Islands. Behr was the first person to systematically study the flora of many parts of South Australia. Many of his collections were named and described by other botanists, including 62 new species by Schlechtendal and others by Meisner, Sonder and Miquel. Many species were named after Behr including Aristida behriana, Baeckea behrii, Caladenia behrii, Diuris behrii, Eremophila behriana, Eriochlamys behrii, Eucalyptus behriana, Lasiopetalum behrii, Loudonia behrii, Prostanthera behriana, Senecio behrianus and Swainsona behriana. The genus Behria Greene is also named after him.

Late in 1849 both Behr and Hillebrand travelled to the Philippines and practised medicine there for about 7 months.

== United States ==
By September 1850, Behr was in the United States of America where he lived in San Francisco for the next 54 years. In 1853 he returned briefly to Germany to marry Miss Agnes Omylska. They had three children in America but his wife died shortly after the birth of the youngest. He earned a living as a doctor but there were sometimes conflicts, as when he was accused by the Lutheran newspaper of being a Jesuit, resulting in patients leaving him and forcing him to move his practice.

Behr continued to collect and describe insects and their relationship with plants and contributed to a number of academic journals including Proceedings of the Entomological Society of Philadelphia and Transactions of the American Entomological Society.

In 1872, the California Pharmaceutical Society was formed and in the same year, the Society appointed Behr professor of botany and he was required to organise excursions "into the country on alternate weeks for the purpose of collecting and studying indigenous plants." Also formed in the same year was the Bohemian Club and in its second year, Behr became a member. In 1884 he found time to write a paper Synopsis of the genera of vascular plants in the vicinity of San Francisco, with an attempt to arrange them according to evolutionary principles writing "In looking from any stand-point, at the variety of organic forms, the theory of evolution will be the most successful in explaining the resemblances and differences of organized life."

In 1891 and 1896, Behr published two essays entitled Botanical Reminiscences in which he describes the changes in the vegetation of San Francisco from 1850. The California Academy of Sciences elected Behr to the position of vice-president in 1895 and three years later he was made curator of entomology. He later donated his large collection of Lepidoptera to the Academy but it was destroyed in the earthquake of 1906. He authored a number of books including The Plants of the Vicinity of San Francisco and a book of verse, The Hoot of the Owl. Behr Avenue in San Francisco is named after him.

On 6 March 1904 Behr died at his home at 1215 Bush Street, at the age of 85 years and 6 months. An obituary, written by his friend Alice Eastwood was published in Nature.
