= Prostanthera behriana =

Tall mintbush

Scientific classification
- Kingdom: Plantae
- Clade: Tracheophytes
- Clade: Angiosperms
- Clade: Eudicots
- Clade: Asterids
- Order: Lamiales
- Family: Lamiaceae
- Genus: Prostanthera
- Species: P. behriana

Binomial name
- Prostanthera behriana Schltdl.
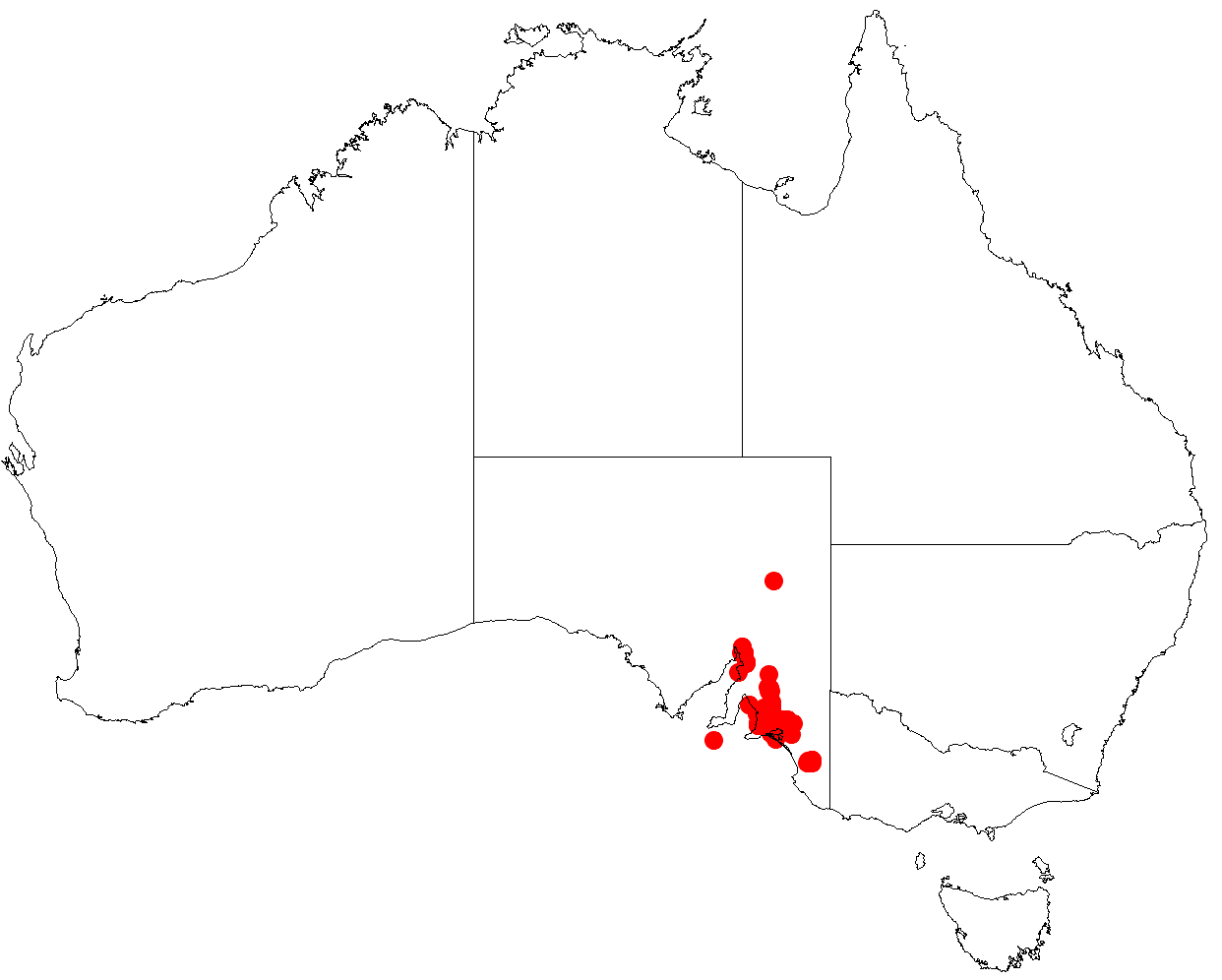
- Occurrence data from AVH

Species of flowering plant

Prostanthera behriana, commonly known as tall mintbush, is a species of flowering plant in the family Lamiaceae and is endemic to the south-east of South Australia. It is an erect to straggling shrub with egg-shaped leaves and white, pale blue, pale violet or purplish white flowers with red-brown spots or purple streaks inside.

== Description ==
Prostanthera behriana is an erect or straggling shrub that typically grows to a height of 1–2.5 m (3 ft 3 in – 8 ft 2 in) with flattened, hairy stems. The leaves are egg-shaped, or egg-shaped with the narrower end towards the base, light to mid-green, 13–26 mm (0.51–1.02 in) long, 2–5 mm (0.079–0.197 in) wide and sessile. The flowers are arranged singly in leaf two to fourteen leaf axils near the ends of branchlets, each flower on a pedicel 0.5–1 mm (0.020–0.039 in) long. The sepals are light green and form a tube 2–3 mm (0.079–0.118 in) long with two lobes, the lower lobe 1–1.5 mm (0.039–0.059 in) long and about 2 mm (0.079 in) wide, the upper lobe 2–3 mm (0.079–0.118 in) long and 3–3.5 mm (0.12–0.14 in) wide. The petals are 15–20 mm (0.59–0.79 in), white, pale blue, pale violet or purplish white with red-brown spots or purple streaks inside, and fused to form a tube 7–10 mm (0.28–0.39 in) long. The lower lip has three lobes, the centre lobe spatula-shaped, 6–10 mm (0.24–0.39 in) long and 4.5–9 mm (0.18–0.35 in) wide and the side lobes 5.5–7 mm (0.22–0.28 in) long and 2.5–3 mm (0.098–0.118 in) wide. The upper lip has two broadly egg-shaped lobes 4–6 mm (0.16–0.24 in) long and about 6 mm (0.24 in) wide.

== Taxonomy ==
Prostanthera behriana was first formally described in 1847 by Schlechtendal in the journal Linnaea from specimens collected by Hans Hermann Behr.

== Distribution and habitat ==
Tall mintbush grows in heath and woodland from the lower Flinders Ranges, through the Mount Lofty Ranges to south of Keith.
