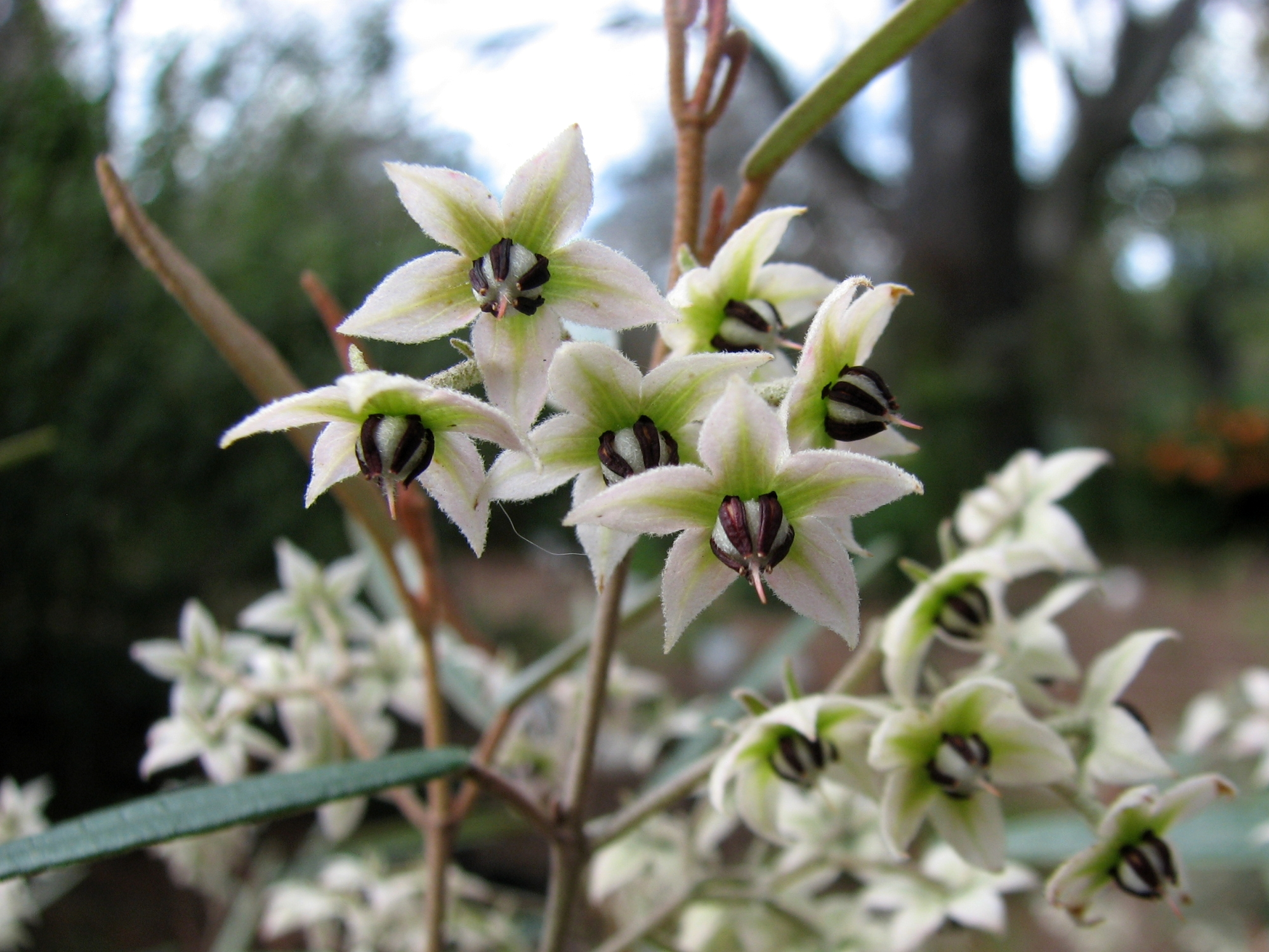
- Lasiopetalum behrii in the Royal Botanic Gardens Melbourne

Scientific classification
- Kingdom: Plantae
- Clade: Tracheophytes
- Clade: Angiosperms
- Clade: Eudicots
- Clade: Rosids
- Order: Malvales
- Family: Malvaceae
- Genus: Lasiopetalum
- Species: L. behrii

Binomial name
- Lasiopetalum behrii F.Muell.

= Lasiopetalum behrii =

Pink velvet bush

Species of plant

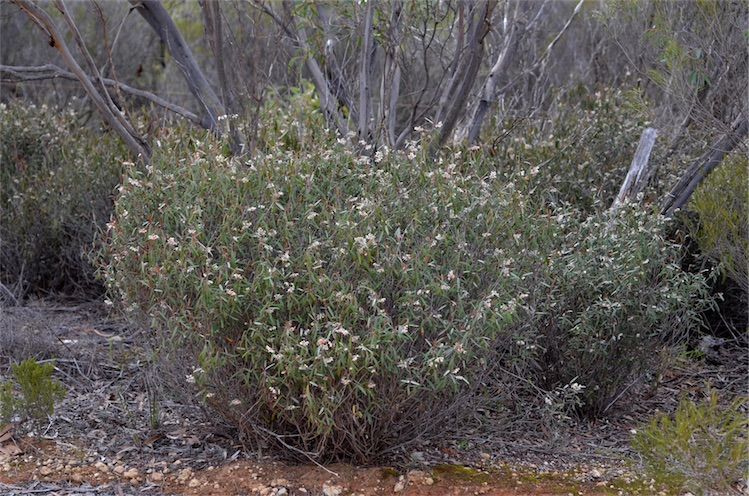
Habit in Venus Bay Conservation Park

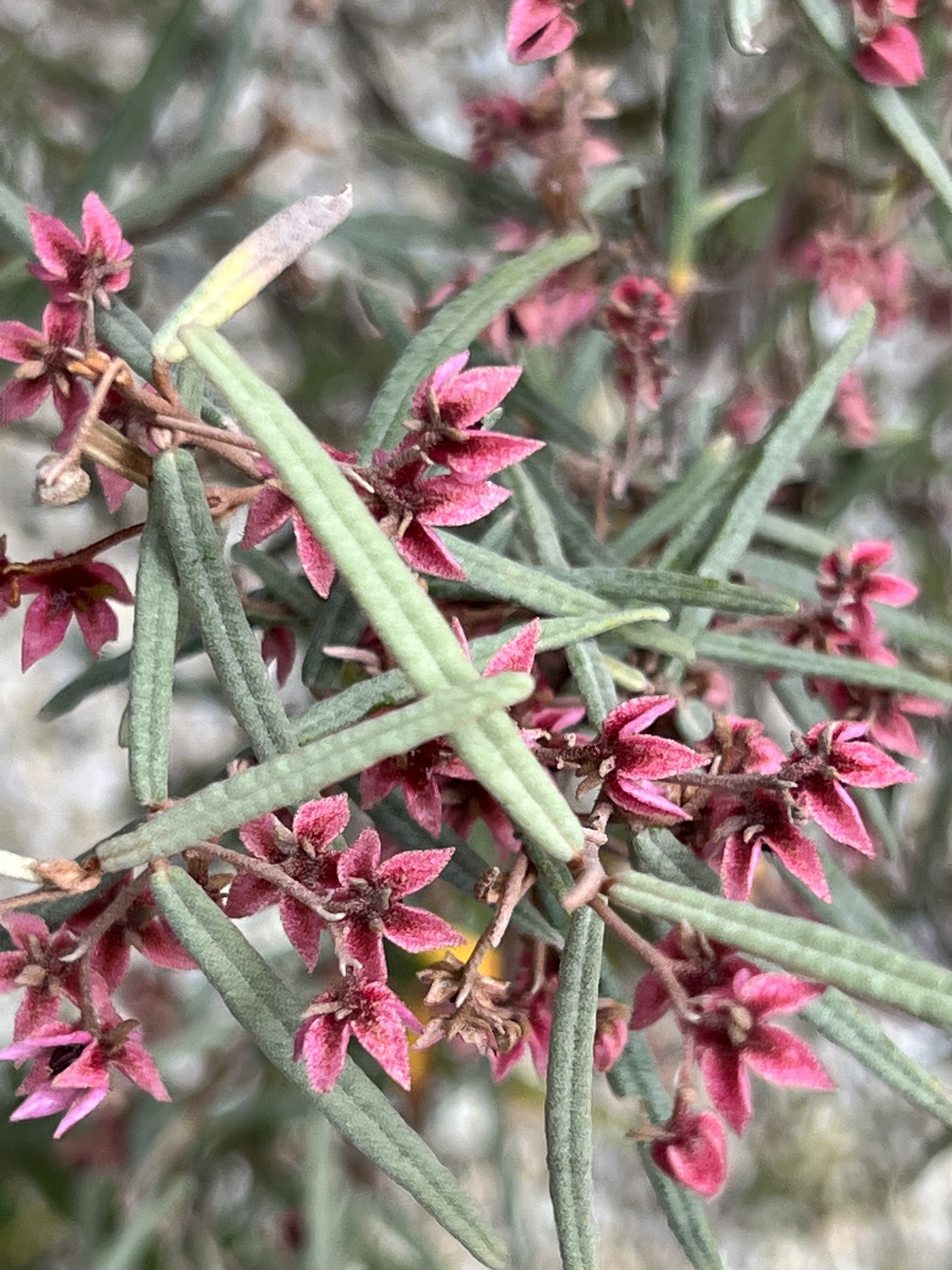
Pink form

Lasiopetalum behrii, commonly known as the pink velvet bush, is a species of flowering plant in the family Malvaceae and is endemic to southern continental Australia. It is an erect shrub with lance-shaped, narrowly oblong to narrowly elliptic leaves and groups of white to pink and reddish-brown flowers.

== Description ==
Lasiopetalum behrii is an erect shrub that typically grows to a height of 0.3–1.5 m (1 ft 0 in – 4 ft 11 in) high and has stiff lance-shaped, narrowly oblong or narrowly elliptic leaves 20–90 mm (0.79–3.54 in) long and 5–30 mm (0.20–1.18 in) wide on a petiole 3–10 mm (0.12–0.39 in) long. The upper surface of the leaves is glabrous and the lower surface is densely covered with woolly, rust-coloured hairs. The flowers are arranged in groups of two to eight, each flower on a pedicel 3–10 mm (0.12–0.39 in) long with three hairy bracteoles 2–3 mm (0.079–0.118 in) long at the base of the sepals. The sepals are white to pink, 3.5–8.0 mm (0.14–0.31 in) long and densely hairy on the back and the five petals are dark reddish-brown and 1.0–1.5 mm (0.039–0.059 in) long. Flowering occurs from July to October and the fruit is a densely hairy capsule 4–8 mm (0.16–0.31 in) long.

== Taxonomy ==
Lasiopetalum behrii was first formally described in 1855 by Ferdinand von Mueller in his Definitions of rare or hitherto undescribed Australian plants published in the Transactions of the Philosophical Society of Victoria, from specimens collected "In the Mallee Scrub on the Murray River and St. Vincent's Gulf" by Hans Hermann Behr. The specific epithet (behrii) honours the collector of the type specimens.

== Distribution and habitat ==
Pink velvet bush grows in mallee, on sand dunes and on granite or limestone hills and occurs in the south of Western Australia, southern South Australia, the north-west of Victoria and the far south-west of New South Wales.

== Conservation status ==
The species is listed as "critically endangered" in New South Wales under the Biodiversity Conservation Act 2016. The main threats to the species in New South Wales include its small population size and distribution, and grazing by livestock and feral goats.
