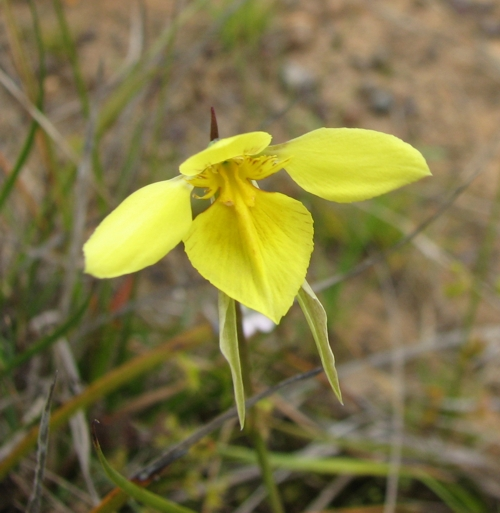
- Diuris behrii growing near Smythesdale

Scientific classification
- Kingdom: Plantae
- Clade: Tracheophytes
- Clade: Angiosperms
- Clade: Monocots
- Order: Asparagales
- Family: Orchidaceae
- Subfamily: Orchidoideae
- Tribe: Diurideae
- Genus: Diuris
- Species: D. behrii

Binomial name
- Diuris behrii Schltdl.

= Diuris behrii =

Golden cowslips

Species of orchid

Diuris behrii, commonly known as golden cowslips, is a species of orchid which is endemic to southern continental Australia. It has between three and six grass-like leaves and a flowering stem with up to four drooping, yellow flowers with dark streaks on the labellum. The flowers appear between September and November in its native range.

== Description ==
Diuris behrii is a tuberous, perennial herb with between three and six grass-like, narrow linear leaves up to 200 mm (8 in) long. Up to four drooping, bright yellow flowers are borne on a flowering stem up to 500 mm (20 in) tall. The pedicel of each flower is enclosed in a bract. The dorsal sepal is egg-shaped, up to 17 mm (0.7 in) long and leans forwards. It has dark streaks similar to those on the labellum. The lateral sepals are greenish, linear to lance-shaped, up to 25 mm (1 in) long and turn downwards and parallel to each other. The petals spread sideways or droop and are narrow egg-shaped to elliptic, up to 25 mm (1 in) long on a green, stalk-like "claw". The labellum is up to 28 mm (1 in) long, often has brownish streaks, and has three lobes. The centre lobe is a broad wedge shape, often with irregular edges. The lateral lobes are small and oblong with toothed edges. There are two ridge-like calli about 5 mm (0.2 in) long near the mid-line of the labellum. Flowering occurs from September to November.

== Taxonomy and naming ==
Diuris behrii was first formally described in 1847 by Diederich Franz Leonhard von Schlechtendal who published his description in Linnaea: ein Journal für die Botanik in ihrem ganzen Umfange, oder Beiträge zur Pflanzenkunde. The specific epithet (behrii) honours the German-American botanist, Hans Hermann Behr.

== Distribution and habitat ==
The golden cowslip orchid grows in grassland and woodland mostly in western Victoria but is also found in south-eastern South Australia. Plants previously included in D. behrii in New South Wales and the Australian Capital Territory are now segregated as D. amabilis.
