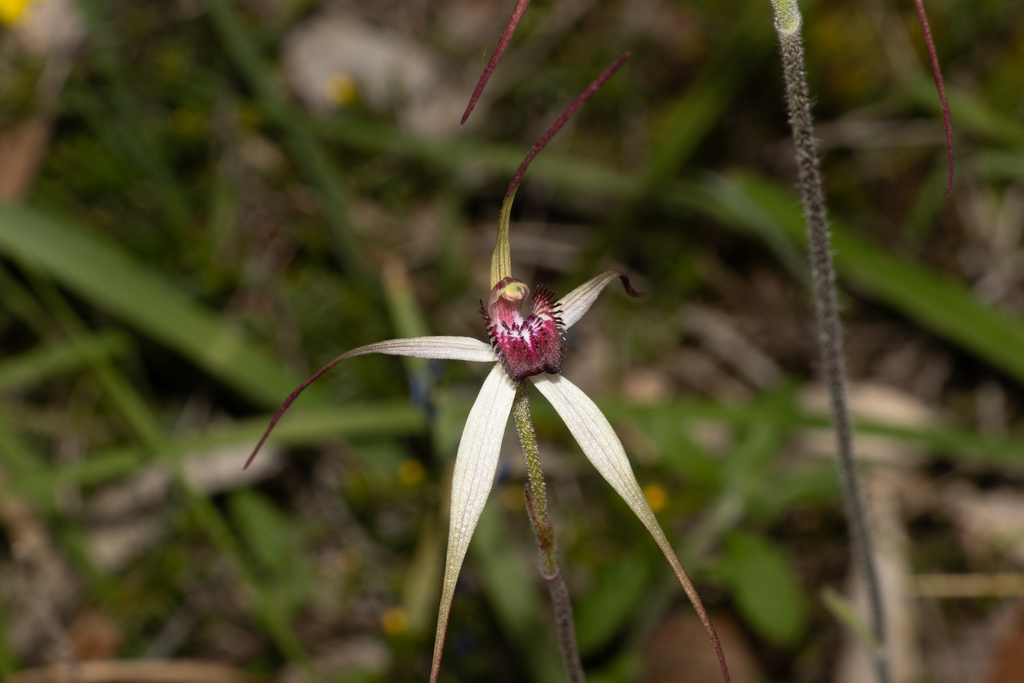

Conservation status
- Endangered (EPBC Act)

Scientific classification
- Kingdom: Plantae
- Clade: Embryophytes
- Clade: Tracheophytes
- Clade: Spermatophytes
- Clade: Angiosperms
- Clade: Monocots
- Order: Asparagales
- Family: Orchidaceae
- Subfamily: Orchidoideae
- Tribe: Diurideae
- Genus: Caladenia
- Species: C. behrii

Binomial name
- Caladenia behrii Schltdl.

Synonyms
- Arachnorchis behrii (Schltdl.) D.L.Jones & M.A.Clem.

= Caladenia behrii =

Pink-lipped spider orchid

Species of orchid

Caladenia behrii, commonly known as pink-lipped spider orchid, is a plant in the orchid family Orchidaceae and is endemic to South Australia. It has a single narrow, hairy leaf and one or two creamy-white flowers with pink tips in early spring.

== Description ==
Caladenia behrii is a terrestrial, perennial, deciduous, herb with an underground tuber and a single hairy, narrow lance-shaped leaf, 5–10 cm (2–4 in) long that develops during winter. There are one or two flowers on a thin, hairy raceme up to 60 cm (20 in) high, each flower up to 10 cm (4 in) in diameter. The lateral sepals and petals are 5–8 cm (2–3 in) long, creamy-white in colour with red glandular tips that produce an aroma described as "strong musky" or "subtle spicy". The petals and sepals spread widely at their bases but have drooping, thread-like ends. The labellum is egg-shaped to lance-shaped, about 10 cm (4 in) long, whitish-green with a pink or red curled tip. The labellum has a fringed edge and there are between four and six rows of red calli along its mid-line. Flowering occurs in August and September and is followed by an oblong-shaped capsule which releases hundreds of seeds in late October or November.

== Taxonomy and naming ==
Caladenia behrii was first formally described by Diederich Schlechtendal in 1847 and the description was published in Linnaea: ein Journal für die Botanik in ihrem ganzen Umfange, oder Beiträge zur Pflanzenkunde. The specific epithet honours the German-American botanist, Hans Hermann Behr.

== Distribution and habitat ==
This caladenia occurs in two small disjunct populations, one near Kersbrook and Williamstown and the other near Belair and Clarendon. It grows on loamy soils in woodland.

== Ecology ==
As with many other caladenias. the pink-lipped spider orchid is pollinated by male thynnid wasps when they attempt to copulate with the labellum. Since the orchid is an endangered species, hand pollination may be used to propagate the species artificially. Research has shown that cross pollination and pollination with a single pollinium increase the number and viability of seeds produced. Unlike for some other species, fire does not induce or increase the flowering of C. behrii.

== Conservation ==
Caladenia behrii is classified as "Endangered" under the Government of South Australia National Parks and Wildlife Act of 1972 and the Australian Government Environment Protection and Biodiversity Conservation Act 1999 (EPBC Act).
