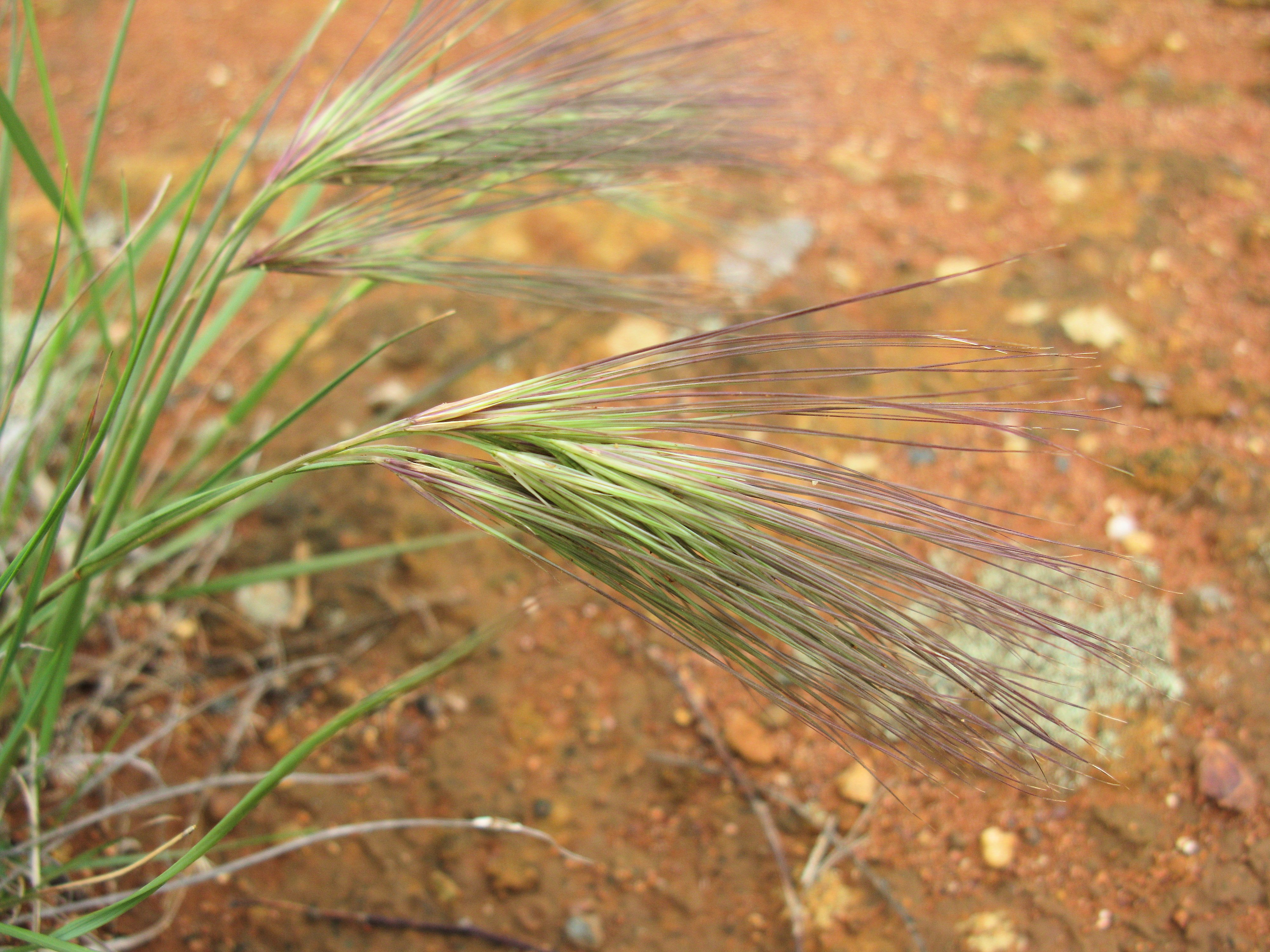

Scientific classification
- Kingdom: Plantae
- Clade: Tracheophytes
- Clade: Angiosperms
- Clade: Monocots
- Clade: Commelinids
- Order: Poales
- Family: Poaceae
- Genus: Aristida
- Species: A. behriana

Binomial name
- Aristida behriana F.Muell.

= Aristida behriana =

Species of plant

Aristida behriana is a native Australian species of grass commonly known as bunch wire grass or brush wire grass. It is a bright green perennial plant forming short, tufted tussocks up to 40 centimetres (16 in) high. Its seeds have three long, radiating awns; it is a member of genus Aristida, grasses known commonly as three-awns. The species favours low fertility and well-drained soils. It is commonly found in mallee woodlands and plains, where it grows on sunny slopes. Superficially, the flower heads resemble those of the invasive weed African feather-grass (Pennisetum villosum). A. behriana is found in all mainland Australian States.
