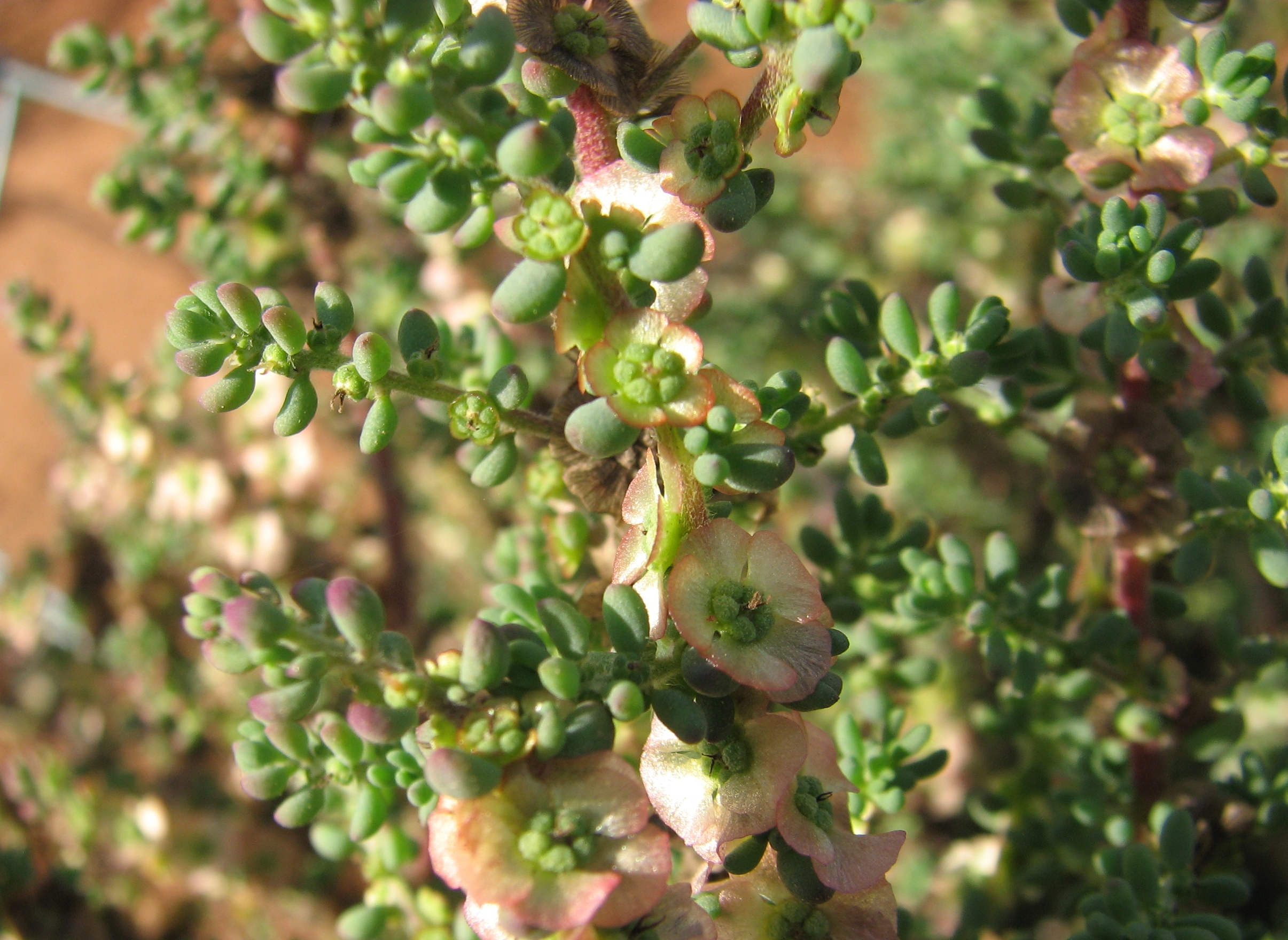

Scientific classification
- Kingdom: Plantae
- Clade: Tracheophytes
- Clade: Angiosperms
- Clade: Eudicots
- Order: Caryophyllales
- Family: Amaranthaceae
- Genus: Maireana
- Species: M. brevifolia

Binomial name
- Maireana brevifolia (R.Br.) Paul G.Wilson

Synonyms
- Enchylaena tamariscina (Lindl.) Druce; Kochia brevifolia R.Br.; Kochia tamariscina (Lindl.) J.M.Black; Kochia thymifolia Lindl.; Salsola brachyphylla Spreng. nom. illeg.; Suaeda tamariscina Lindl.

= Maireana brevifolia =

Species of plant

Maireana brevifolia, commonly known as small-leaf bluebush, eastern cotton bush or short-leaf bluebush is a species of flowering plant in the family Amaranthaceae and is endemic to Australia, and naturalised in other countries. It is a bushy, erect or rounded shrub or short-lived perennial plant with scattered, fleshy egg-shaped to spindle-shaped leaves, bisexual flowers arranged singly, and a thick and fleshy fruiting perianth with fan-shaped wings.

== Description ==
Maireana brevifolia is a bushy, erect or rounded shrub or short-lived perennial plant that grows to a height of 0.2–1 m (7.9 in – 3 ft 3.4 in) and has thin branches, sparsely covered with woolly hairs. Its leaves are egg-shaped with the narrower end towards the base to slender spindle-shaped, 2–5 mm (0.079–0.197 in) long, fleshy and glabrous. The flowers are bisexual and arranged singly and mostly glabrous. The fruiting perianth is glabrous, thin-walled and hemispherical, about 2 mm (0.079 in) in diameter with a faintly ten-ribbed tube and five papery, fan-shaped wings up to 2–3 mm (0.079–0.118 in) long.

== Taxonomy ==
This species was first described in 1810 by Robert Brown who gave it the name Kochia brevifolia in his Prodromus Florae Novae Hollandiae. In 1975, Paul G. Wilson transferred the species to Maireana as M. brevifolia in the journal Nuytsia. The specific epithet (brevifolia) means 'short-leaved'.

== Distribution and habitat ==
Maireana brevifolia grows in heavy, winter-wet and sometimes saline soils in the south-west of Western Australia, the banks of the upper Finke River in the south of the Northern Territory, the south-east of South Australia, Queensland, inland New South Wales and Victoria. It is one of the first species to appear in disturbed saline habitats.

Cotton bush is also naturalised in South Africa, the Middle East and the Canary Islands.
