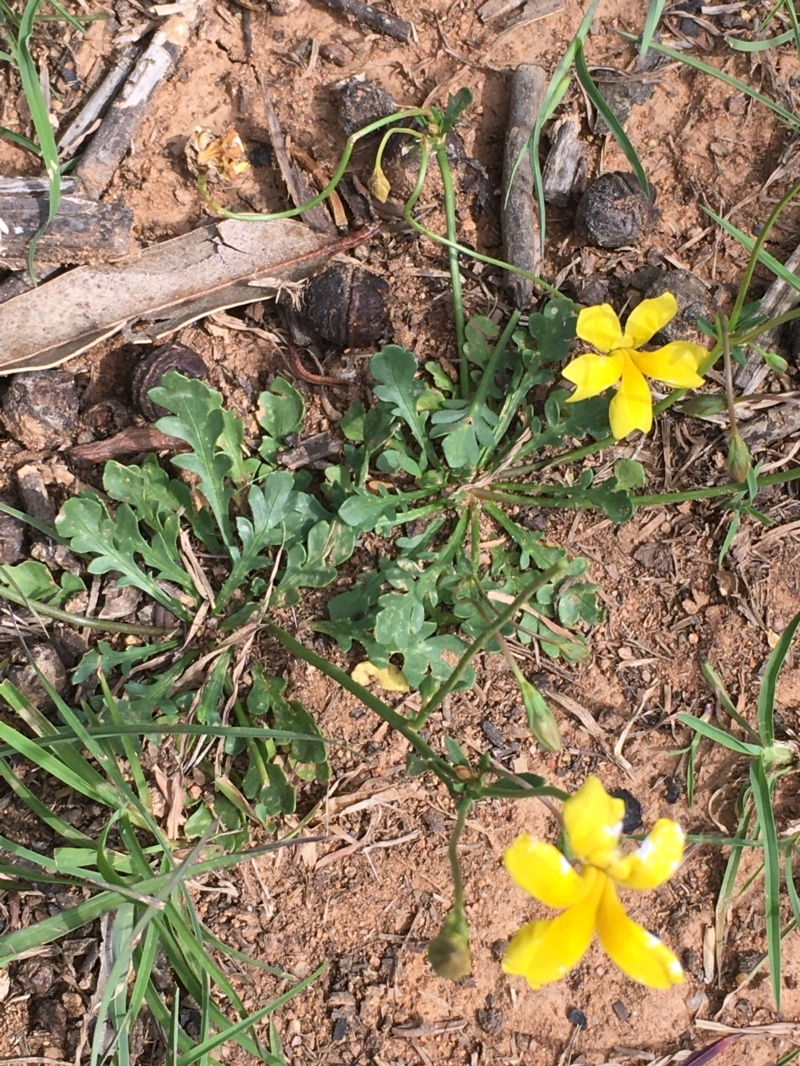
- Goodenia pinnatifida in the Australian Capital Territory

Scientific classification
- Kingdom: Plantae
- Clade: Tracheophytes
- Clade: Angiosperms
- Clade: Eudicots
- Clade: Asterids
- Order: Asterales
- Family: Goodeniaceae
- Genus: Goodenia
- Species: G. pinnatifida

Binomial name
- Goodenia pinnatifida Schltdl.

Synonyms
- ? Goodenia glabriflora K.Krause; Goodenia pinnatifida var. minor F.Muell. & Tate; Goodenia pinnatifida Schltdl. var. pinnatifida; Goodenia schomburgkii K.Krause nom. inval., pro syn.

= Goodenia pinnatifida =

Cut-leaf goodenia

Species of plant

Goodenia pinnatifida, commonly known as cut-leaf goodenia, scrambled eggs or mother ducks, is a species of flowering plant in the family Goodeniaceae and endemic to Australia. It is a low-lying to ascending perennial herb with toothed to pinnatisect leaves, racemes of yellow flowers and more or less spherical fruit.

== Description ==
Goodenia pinnatifida is a low-lying to ascending perennial herb that typically grows to a height of 40 cm (16 in). The leaves at the base of the plant are oblong to lance-shaped in outline, mostly 50–80 mm (2.0–3.1 in) long and 3–20 mm (0.12–0.79 in) wide. These leaves are toothed to pinnatisect with linear or oblong lobes, but the leaves on the stems, when present, are smaller. The flowers are arranged in racemes up to 80 mm (3.1 in) long with leaf-like bracts, each flower on a pedicel 20–120 mm (0.79–4.72 in) long. The sepals are lance-shaped, 2.5–5 mm (0.098–0.197 in) long and the corolla is yellow, 8–19 mm (0.31–0.75 in) long and densely hairy inside. The lower lobes of the corolla are 3.5–8 mm (0.14–0.31 in) long with wings up to 2.5 mm (0.098 in) wide. Flowering mainly occurs from May to November and the fruit is a more or less spherical capsule about 8 mm (0.31 in) in diameter.

== Taxonomy and naming ==
Goodenia pinnatifida was first formally described in 1848 by Diederich Franz Leonhard von Schlechtendal in the journal Linnaea: ein Journal für die Botanik in ihrem ganzen Umfange, oder Beiträge zur Pflanzenkunde. The specific epithet (pinnatifida) refers to the shape of the leaves.

== Distribution and habitat ==
Cut-leaf goodenia grows in a variety of habitats including grassland, woodland and forest. It occurs in all Australian states and the Australian Capital Territory but not the Northern Territory.
