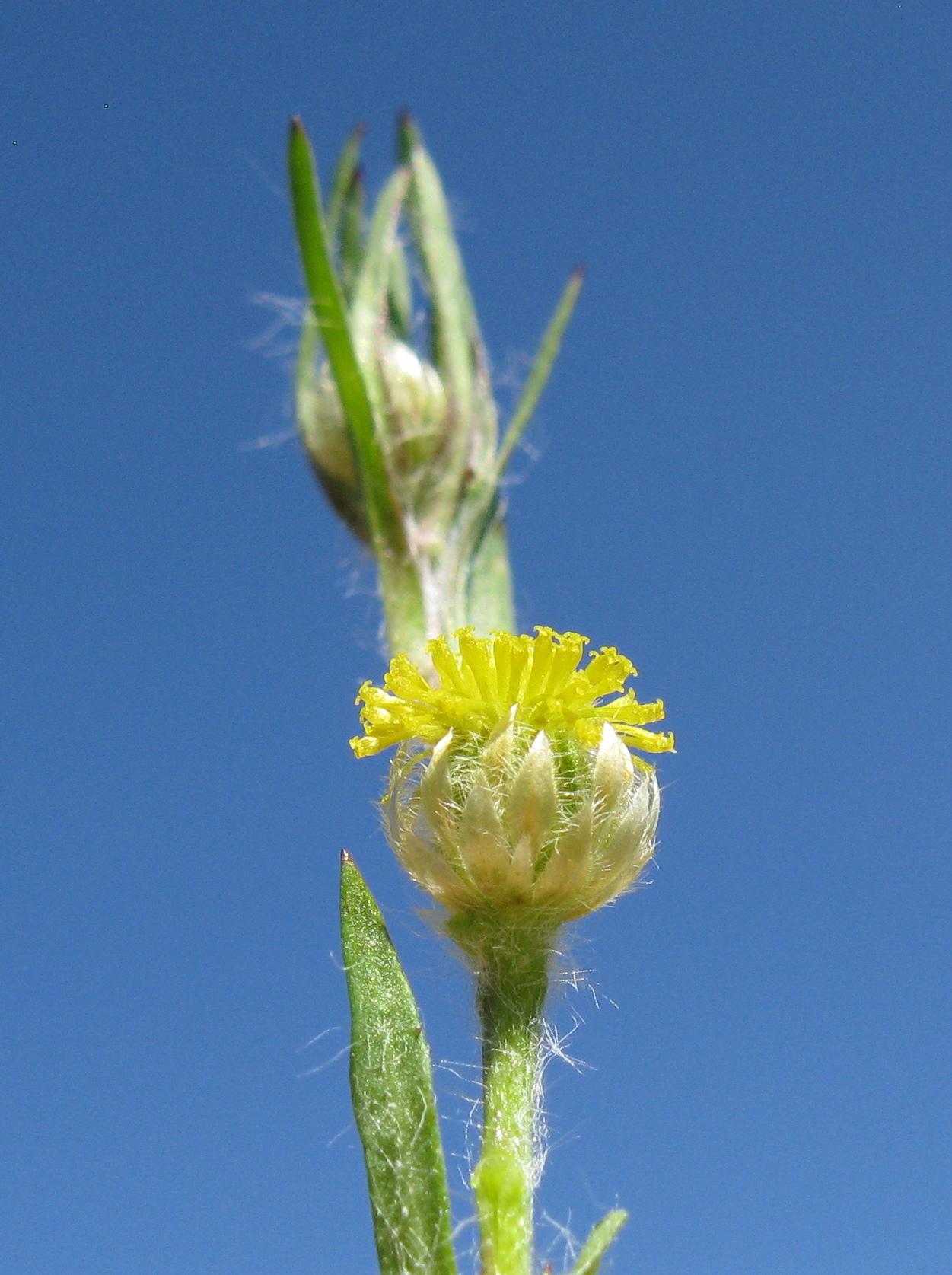
- Triptilodiscus pygmaeus

Scientific classification
- Kingdom: Plantae
- Clade: Tracheophytes
- Clade: Angiosperms
- Clade: Eudicots
- Clade: Asterids
- Order: Asterales
- Family: Asteraceae
- Subfamily: Asteroideae
- Tribe: Gnaphalieae
- Genus: Triptilodiscus; Turcz.
- Species: T. pygmaeus

Binomial name
- Triptilodiscus pygmaeus Turcz.

Synonyms
- Dimorpholepis A.Gray; Gnaphalium ser. Triptilodiscus (Turcz.) Kuntze; Helipterum australe (A.Gray) Druce; Duttonia sessiliceps F.Muell.; Helipterum dimorpholepis Benth.; Argyrocome dimorpholepis (Benth.) Kuntze; Dimorpholepis australis A.Gray; Helipterum pygmaeum (Turcz.) Druce.

= Triptilodiscus =

Genus of flowering plants

Triptilodiscus is a genus of flowering plants in the tribe Gnaphalieae within the family Asteraceae.

Species

The only known species is Triptilodiscus pygmaeus, called the common sunray. It is native to Australia, found in all six states plus the Northern Territory.
