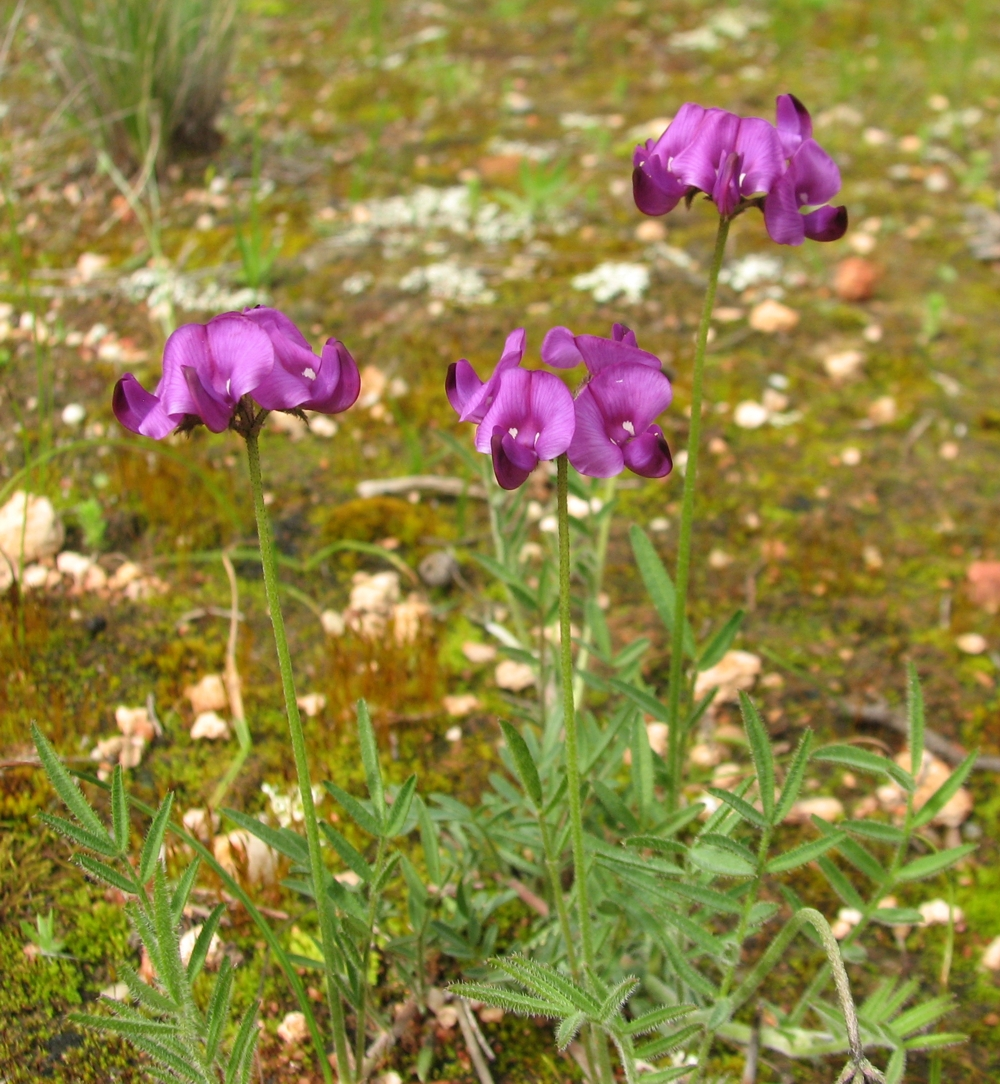
- In Terrick Terrick National Park, Victoria

Scientific classification
- Kingdom: Plantae
- Clade: Tracheophytes
- Clade: Angiosperms
- Clade: Eudicots
- Clade: Rosids
- Order: Fabales
- Family: Fabaceae
- Subfamily: Faboideae
- Genus: Swainsona
- Species: S. behriana

Binomial name
- Swainsona behriana F.Muell. ex J.M.Black

Synonyms
- Swainsona lessertiifolia var. tephrotricha (F.Muell.) Benth. p.p.; Swainsona oroboides subsp. hirsuta (J.M.Black) A.T.Lee; Swainsona oroboides var. hirsuta J.M.Black; Swainsona oroboides auct. non F.Muell. ex Benth.: Weber, J.Z.; Swainsona sericea auct. non (A.T.Lee) J.M.Black ex H.Eichler: Thompson, J.

= Swainsona behriana =

Species of plant

Swainsona behriana, commonly known as Behr's swainsona, is a species of flowering plant in the family Fabaceae and is endemic to south-eastern continental Australia. It is a prostrate or low-growing perennial herb with imparipinnate leaves usually with 9 to 13 narrowly elliptic to egg-shaped leaflets with the narrower end towards the base, and racemes of 2 to 7 purple flowers.

== Description ==
Swainsona behriana is a prostrate or low-lying perennial herb, that typically grows to a height of up to 15 cm (5.9 in) with many slender stems arising from its base. Its leaves are imparipinnate, 30–50 mm (1.2–2.0 in) long with stipules 2–5 mm (0.079–0.197 in) long at the base. There are 9 to 13 narrowly elliptic to egg-shaped leaflets with the narrower end towards the base, mostly 5–10 mm (0.20–0.39 in) and 1–3 mm (0.039–0.118 in) wide. The flowers are arranged in racemes 50–150 mm (2.0–5.9 in) long of 2 to 7 on a peduncle up to 1.5 mm (0.059 in) in diameter, each flower 7–10 mm (0.28–0.39 in) long. The sepals are softly-hairy and joined at the base, forming a tube 2.0–2.5 mm (0.079–0.098 in) long, the sepal lobes about the same length as the tube. The petals are purple, the standard petal 7–8 mm (0.28–0.31 in) long and 9–12 mm (0.35–0.47 in) wide, the wings 7–8 mm (0.28–0.31 in) long, and the keel mostly 7–9 mm (0.28–0.35 in) long. Flowering occurs from August to January, and the fruit is an oblong pod 10–18 mm (0.39–0.71 in) long and 3–7 mm (0.12–0.28 in) wide with the remains of the style 3–4 mm (0.12–0.16 in) long.

== Taxonomy and naming ==
Swainsona behriana was first formally described in 1927 by John McConnell Black in Transactions and proceedings of the Royal Society of South Australia, from an unpublished description by Ferdinand von Mueller. According to Black, the specific epithet (behriana) "was doubtless named after Dr. Behr, a physician and botanist then practising at Gawler".

== Distribution and habitat ==
Behr's swainsona grows in grassland, grassy woodland and forest clearings and occurs on the slopes and tablelands of New South Wales, in scattered locations mostly in the lowlands west of Melbourne in Victoria, but also in montane areas further east, and in southern districts of South Australia.

== Conservation status ==
Swainsona behriana is listed as "endangered" under the Victorian Government Flora and Fauna Guarantee Act 1988.
