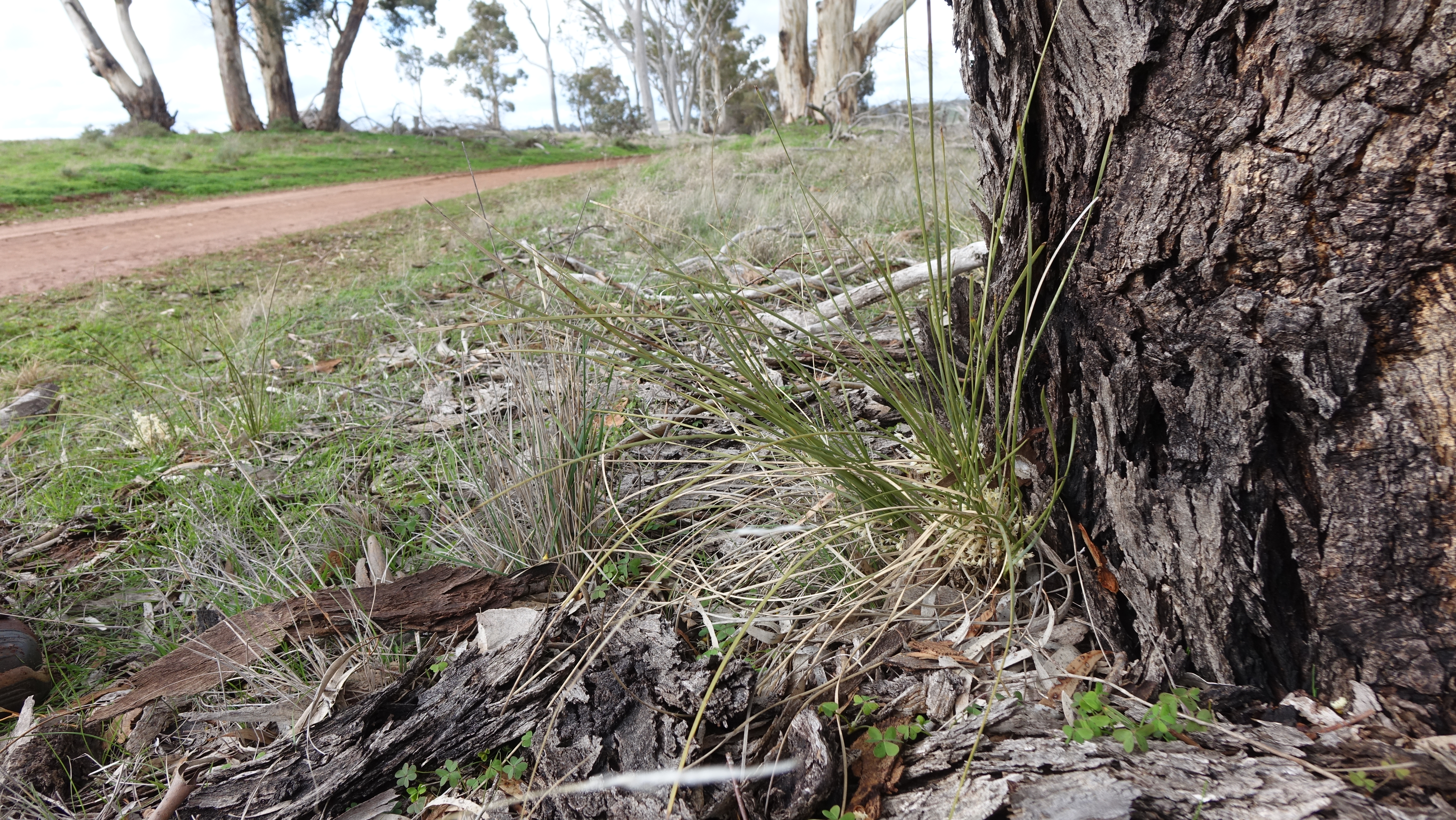
- Lomandra effusa in flower at base of tree

Scientific classification
- Kingdom: Plantae
- Clade: Tracheophytes
- Clade: Angiosperms
- Clade: Monocots
- Order: Asparagales
- Family: Asparagaceae
- Subfamily: Lomandroideae
- Genus: Lomandra
- Species: L. effusa

Binomial name
- Lomandra effusa Ewart

= Lomandra effusa =

Species of plant

Lomandra effusa is a perennial, dioecious, rhizomatous herb native to Australia. It is a perennial tussock with bluish green, large, arching leaves which are distinctive by the two toothed leaf tip. It has white, cream or pink fragrant flowers during the months of June to October.

This native Australian plant is found in Victoria, SA, south of WA, ACT, and NSW states on slopes and dunes, well-drained flats, and near salt pans and granite outcrops. It grows in most soils with full to partial sun and is tolerant to harsh weather including droughts and heavy frost and against invasive species. It is often found in tussock grassland ecological groups alongside its close relative Lomandra multiflora and other similar sized perennial grasses.

Lomandra effusa forms a habitat that acts as protection for small native animals. It can be a food source for some herbivores, birds, butterflies, and larvae but is only used for grazing in poor years.

The tussock grassland ecological group it is found in is considered endangered. It became protected under the Australia’s Natural Environment Protection and Conservation act in 1999.

Lomandra effusa is used for soil stabilisation to control erosion and for ornamental purposed in home gardens, roundabouts, reserves, and parks.

== Description ==
Lomandra effusa is a native Australian grass-like plant which can grow up to 50 cm in height and width and reaches maturity in 2.5 years. It is a tough perennial tussock herb consisting of long, flat, arching leaves 10–50 cm in length and up to 2mm wide with 2 points at each leaf tip due to tapering. These leaves appear a bluish green or grey colour and are strong and tough.

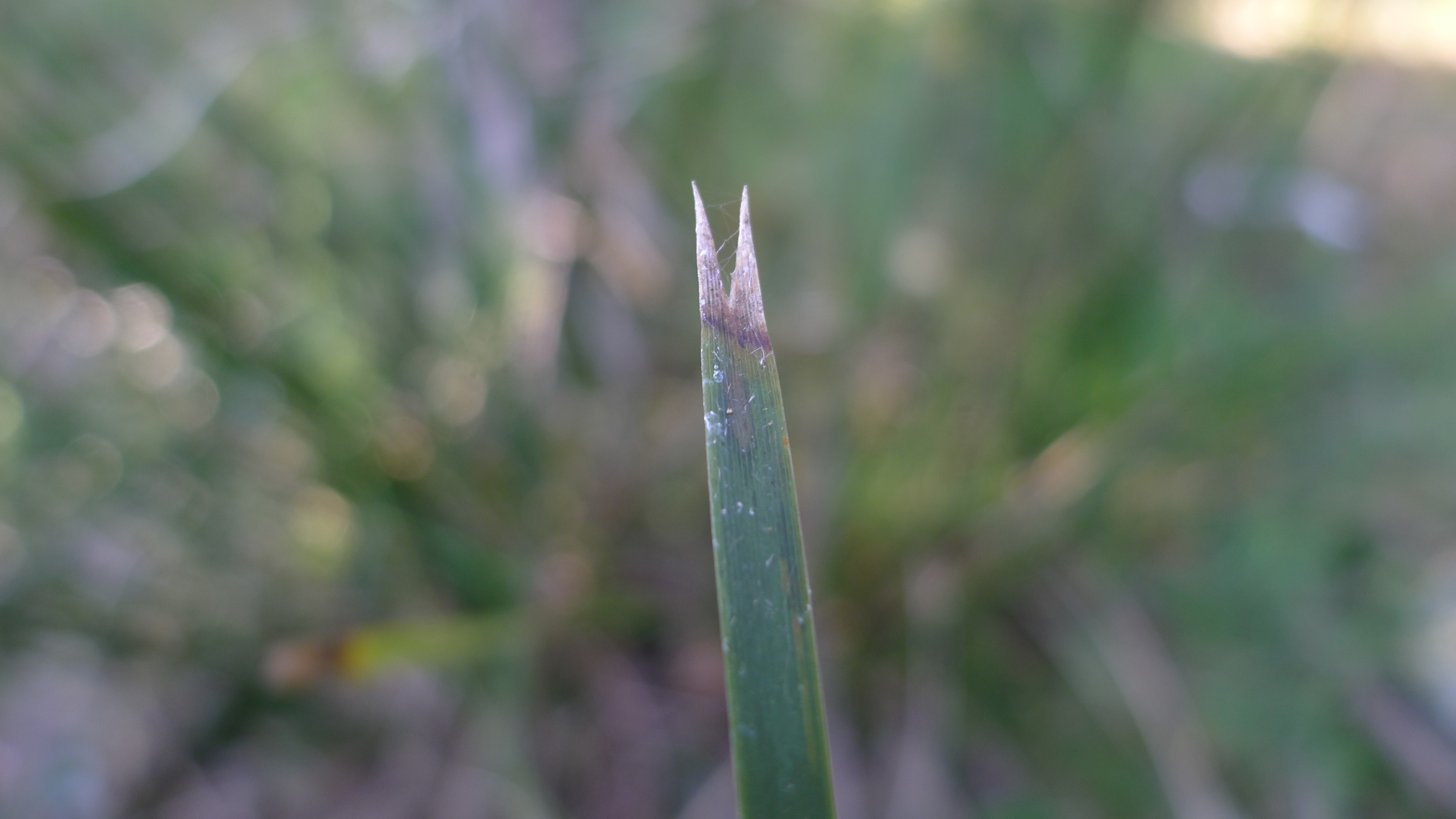
Lomandra leaf tip by John Trann (cc licence)

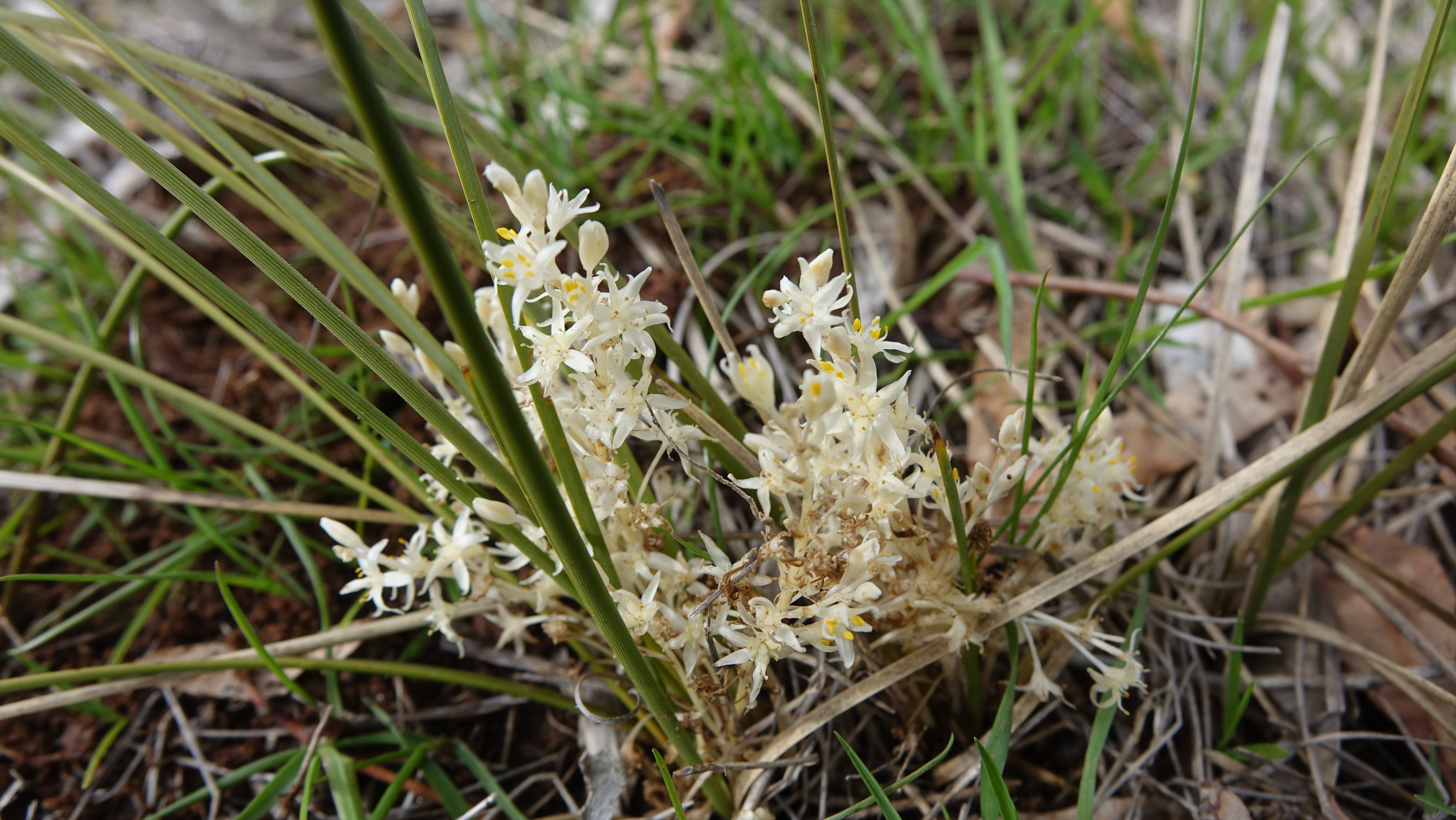
Lomandra effusa flowering

Its inflorescence is most similar to its relative Lomandra marginate which has white flowers. Lomandra effusa is distinguishable by its two-toothed leaf tips. Lomandra effusa has white, cream, or pink funnel-shaped flowers with a strong fragrance in winter and spring following the rain (from June to October). Each plant is dioecious meaning the male and female reproductive organs are found on separate flowers and each plant has either male or female flowers. Lomandra effusa has its distinct male and female flowers grouped on branches 3–15 cm long with the pedicel up to 1 cm.

The male flowers generally have a narrow perianth and narrow tepals and the female flowers have a broader perianth, broad based tepals and are on shorter pedicels. Female flowers have stiffer segments and a thicker and broader base than male flowers. The flowering branches of Lomandra effusa are 3–15 cm long, about 1/3 the length of the leaves. Each flowering branch has a non-flowering axis 1-2.5 cm then the flowering axis 4.5–10 cm long. The bracts are pale brown to translucent and often longer than the pedicel. The base of this perennial herb is brown and fibrous.

== Taxonomy ==
=== Taxonomic History ===
The genus for Lomandra effusa was transferred from the genus classification Xerotes to the proper classification for these native Australian plants considered to be Lomandra. This was due to it once being considered as part of the same family of Xanthorrhoea as it has much in common.

=== Modern classification and common names ===
The binomial classification of this native Australian plant is Lomandra effusa, commonly referred to as iron grass, scented mat-rush, Cocky’s bootlace, Xerotes effusa and Xerotes fragrans.

Lomandra effusa is part of the Asparagales order in which most are herbaceous perennials with six tepals and up to six stamens and the family Asparagaceae often treated as Lomandraceae or Liliaceae. Using the APG III system, it also belongs to the subfamily Lomandroideae derived from the genus name Lomandra that the species effusa belongs. In addition, Lomandra effusa is part of the Lomandra series Sparsiflorae, as is its close relative Lomandra marginata, as they possess narrow bracts that do not surround the pedicel.

=== Etymology ===
Lomandra comes from the Greek word ‘loma’ which refers to an edge or boarder and the Greek word ‘andros’ or ‘andra’ which means male or man. This is referring to a circular edge of the anthers which are found in some species of Lomandra.

The species name effusa comes from the feminine singular or neuter plural of the Latin ‘effusus’ or ‘effundo’. ‘Effusus’ or ‘effundo’ means to pour out, spread out, vast, extensive, or wide referring to the spreading and growth of the species.

== Distribution and habitat ==
IBRA version 7 map (cc licence)

Lomandra effusa is native to Australia and found in Victoria, SA, south of WA, ACT, and NSW states. It is found from the coast of Australia to the mountains. The bioregions, according to the Interim Biogeographic Regionalisation for Australia (IBRA) system, it is found in Victoria include the Wimmera, Goldfields, Dundas Tablelands, Northern inland slopes, Greater Grampians, and Volcanic and Robinvale Plains and Riverina. Lomandra effusa is found in the Murry regions across Victoria, Western Australia, and South Australia. It is also found in Mallee communities in Victoria and Western Australia. In the South Australian state, it is also found in the Nullarbor, Gairdner-Torrens, Eyre and Yorke Peninsula’s, Flinders Rangers, and in the Eastern and South Eastern bioregions and the South and North Lofty communities. In NSW, Lomandra effusa is found in subdivisions west of Condobolin. It is also found in the Eremaean and South-West regions of Western Australia. Within these regions, Lomandra effusa is located in subregions of the Avon Wheatbelt, in Coolgardie, Northern Jarrah Forest, Eastern Murchison, Yalgoo, and Esperance and Swan Coastal plains and Geraldton Sandplains.

Lomandra effusa forms sedges and rushes on lake slopes and dunes, well-drained flats, and near salt pans and granite outcrops. It is the dominant species in the Lomandra Effusa tussock grassland ecological group which is often found on hill slopes in the east and south and lofty communities. It can also be found as the dominant or co dominant species in the Lomandra effusa and Lomandra multiflora tussock grassland ecological group which is often found on hill slopes and plains in the east.

== Ecology ==
The inflorescence of Lomandra effusa occurs after the rain. It flowers during winter and spring in the months of June to October.

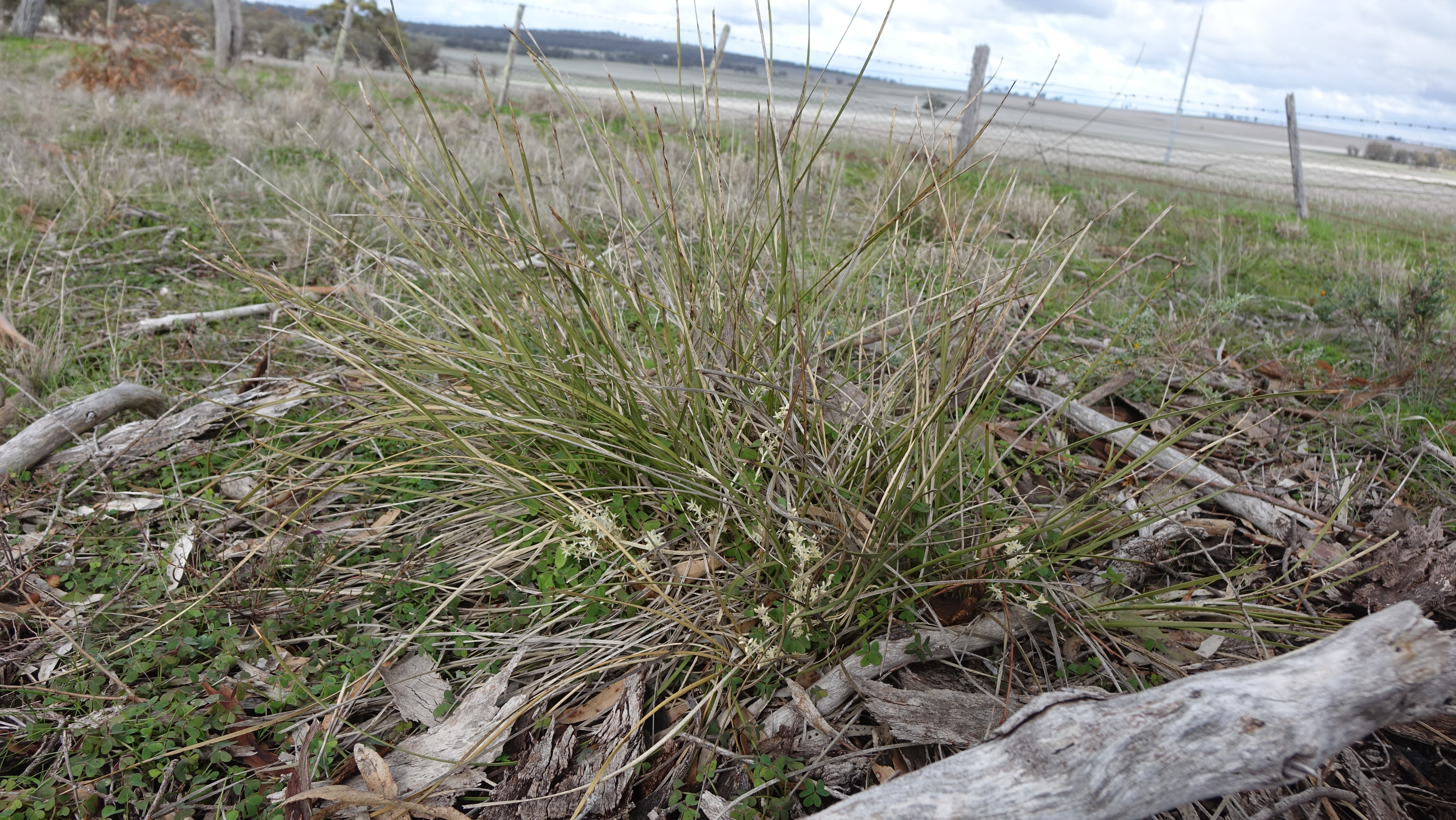
Lomandra effusa in a cleared agricultural landscape amongst weedy species such as Oxalis

Lomandra effusa is tolerant of harsh weather including drought and moderate to heavy frost. It prefers full sun and tolerates partial shade particularly in harsher areas. This perennial herb can also tolerate lime and most soils. This native Australian plant grows in well-drained soils which are sandy, loam or clay or sometimes heavier soils or ironstone gravel. It is sometimes near salt pans or granite outcrops and with a variety of vegetation types. It is also tolerant of soils with a pH which is neutral or acidic in nature and occasionally alkaline.Lomandra effusa is found in tussock grassland group communities, often the dominant or codominant species alongside its close relative Lomandra multiflora. It is also often accompanied by other native perennial flora and specifically other tussock grasses similar in size to Lomandra effusa. Tussock grasslands containing Lomandra effusa grow in areas which range from 5-70% canopy cover and where the undergrowth can reach up to 70% coverage. It is part of what provides this ecological community with its characteristic tussock structure. As a native Australian plant, Lomandra effusa also remains resilient in its ecological community against invasive species.

Lomandra effusa forms a habitat which provides protection to many small native animals including mammals and reptiles. It can be a source of food for some herbivores and seed eating native birds and the fragrant flowers serve as a food source for butterflies and larvae. Lomandra effusa is not grazed for livestock except for particularly poor years due to the tough and fibrous leaves and the shape of the leaf tips causing it to be less digestible for large herbivores, this means it is less affected by grazing pressures than other grasses.

== Conservation ==
There are 68 accepted species belonging to the Lomandra genus including Lomandra effusa. In 1982, Iron grass grassland communities where Lomandra effusa is found was considered endangered and poorly or not conserved in South Australia. Grassland communities with Lomandra effusa and its close relative Lomandra multiflora were still considered poorly conserved in the 1991 Native Vegetation act. In South Australia, the iron grass natural temperate grassland ecological communities containing Lomandra effusa became protected under the Australia’s Natural Environment Protection and Conservation act in 1999. This Act considered Lomandra effusa threatened in some areas while found in abundance in others. In 2001, Lomandra effusa tussock grasslands where Lomandra effusa is the dominant species persistent in the ecological community, were again considered threatened and a high priority for conservation. Lomandra effusa plants spacing and grassland community’s foliage is varied from scarce to dense. Under Federal legislation, the iron grass temperate grassland ecological community involving Lomandra effusa remained classified as critically endangered.

== Uses ==
Plants in the Lomandra genus are often used for commercial and domestic applications. Some have been used for food or as a way of obtaining foods, ornamental purposes, bush medicine or erosion control by mass planting. When species within the Lomandra genus are used for these commercial purposes, it is required that the plants be produced uniformly and in high numbers by utilising plant tissue culture.

=== Ornamental ===
Lomandra effusa is often used as an ornamental tussock shrub. It is used to decorate home gardens and containers, or for roundabouts, nature strips, reserves, and parks in city or coastal areas.

=== Soil stabilisation ===
This native perennial plant is used to provide soil stabilisation with mass planting. This soil stabilisation results in the prevention, reduction, and control of erosion particularly around waterways.

=== Propagation and cultivation ===
The methods of propagation for the Lomandra effusa plant include from seed or by root division of the clumps of this perennial tussock. Untidy foliage can be cut, and old tussocks can be burned to regenerate them. Seeds take 2–12 weeks to germinate. For cultivation, these plants require well-drained soil, full sun or partial shade in particularly hot areas and mulch in winter in particularly cold areas.
