= Serpentine =

Serpentine may refer to:

== Shapes ==
- Serpentine shape, a shape resembling a serpent
- Serpentine curve, a mathematical curve
- Serpentine, a type of riding figure

== Science and nature ==
- Serpentine subgroup, a group of minerals
- Serpentinite, a type of rock
- Serpentine soil, soil derived from serpentinite
- Serpentine (alkaloid), a chemical compound
- Serpentine receptor, a protein in cellular membranes
- Serpentine powder, a type of gunpowder

== Objects ==
- Serpentine lock, a component of matchlock muskets
- Serpentine (cannon), a military weapon
- Serpentine belt, an automotive component
- Serpentine streamer, a party accessory

== Places ==
=== Australia ===
- Serpentine, Victoria, Australia, a town
- Serpentine, Western Australia, a town
- Serpentine Dam, Tasmania, the dam used to contain Lake Pedder in Tasmania, Australia
- Serpentine Dam, Western Australia, the water-supply dam for Perth, in Western Australia
- Serpentine Pipehead Dam, in Western Australia
- Serpentine Gorge, a gorge in the West MacDonnell Ranges in Australia's Northern Territory
- Serpentine Lakes, salt lakes in the Great Victoria Desert of Australia
- Serpentine National Park, Western Australia
- Shire of Serpentine-Jarrahdale, Western Australia

=== Elsewhere ===
- Serpentine (lake), in London, England
- La Serpentine, a mountain of the Alps
- Serpentine Road, in Western Patna, India
- Serpentine Hot Springs, Alaska

== Music ==
- Serpentine (Flowing Tears album), a 2002 goth metal album by Flowing Tears
- Serpentine (Han Bennink and Dave Douglas album), 1996
- "Serpentine" (song), a 2011 country song by Tiffany
- Serpentines (Ingrid Laubrock album), a 2016 album
- A 2010 alternative metal song by Disturbed on Asylum
- A 2006 pop electronica song by Kate Havnevik on Melankton
- A 2006 electronica song by My My on A Bugged Out Mix
- A 2002 pop song by the Norwegian band Motorpsycho
- A 2009 synthpop song by Peaches on I Feel Cream
- A 1987 indie rock song by Yo La Tengo on New Wave Hot Dogs

== Other uses ==
- Serpentine system, in structuring competitions
- Serpentine (book), a 2020 fantasy story by Philip Pullman
- Serpentine (1979) book by Thomas Thompson (American author)
- Serpentine (horse), racehorse winner of the 2020 Epsom Derby
- Serpentine (Ninjago), a fictional race in Ninjago
- Serpentine (video game), a 1982 action game made for the Apple II

== See also ==
- Serpent (disambiguation)
- Serpentina (disambiguation)
- Serpentine Dam (disambiguation)
- Serpentine River (disambiguation), several waterways
