= Serpentine River =

Serpentine River may refer to:

- Serpentine River (Alaska), waterway on the Seward Peninsula
- Serpentine River (New Zealand)
- Serpentine River (Tasmania), Australia
- Serpentine River (Western Australia)
- Serpentine River (British Columbia), Canada
- Serpentine River (New Brunswick), Canada
- Serpentine River (Newfoundland), Canada
- Serpentine River (Québec), Canada
- The River Westbourne, London, England (formerly known as the Serpentine River)
- The Serpentine, London, England (lake formerly known as the Serpentine River)

== See also ==
- Serpentine (disambiguation)
