= Lowlands Homestead =

Heritage site in Western Australia

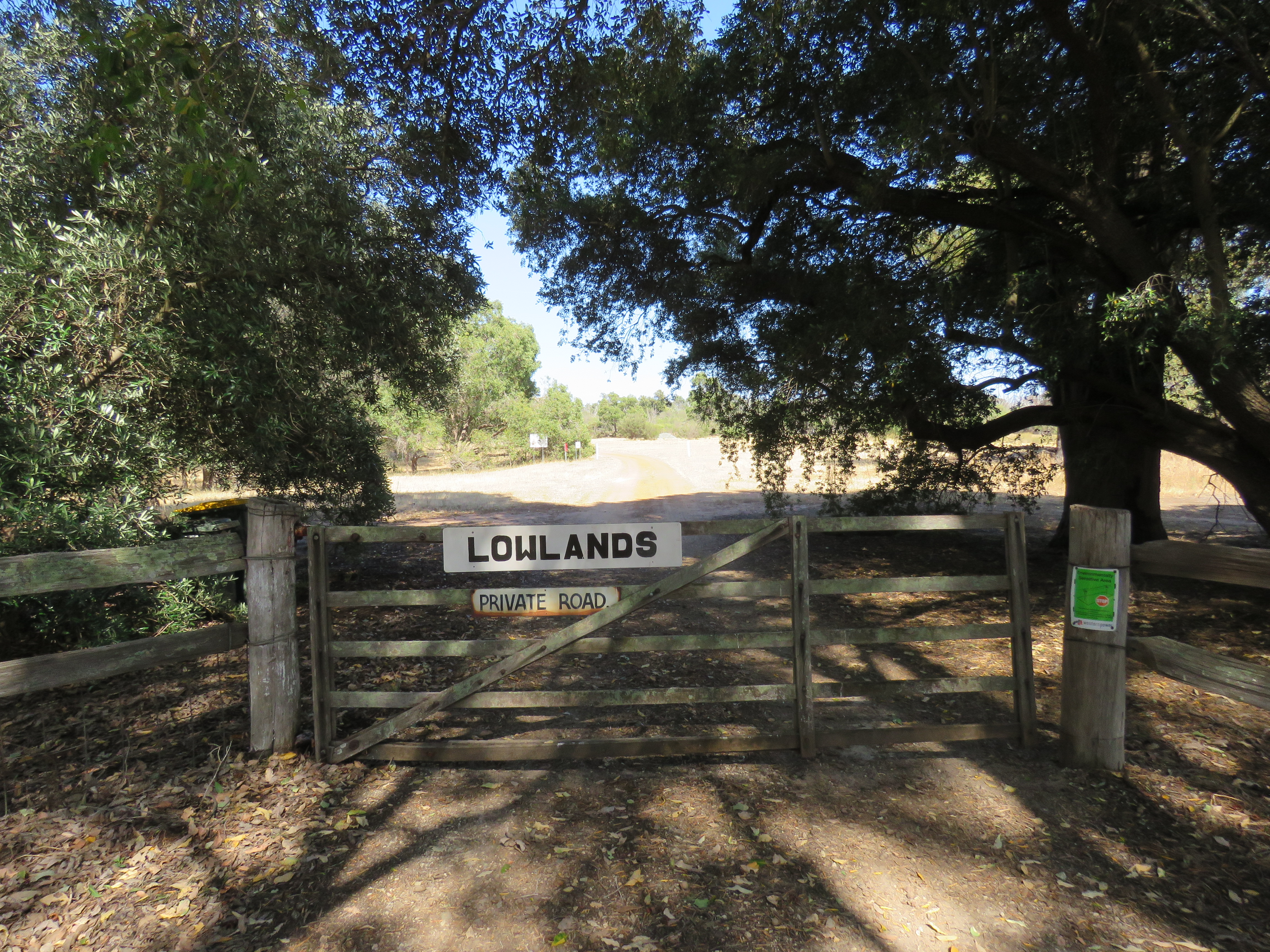
- Access gate to the homestead and nature reserve on Lowlands Road
- Interactive map of the Lowlands Homestead area

General information
- Location: Mardella, Shire of Serpentine-Jarrahdale, Western Australia, 509 Lowlands Road, Mardella, Australia
- Coordinates: 32.334897°S 115.902178°E

Design and construction
- Designations: Register of the National Estate State Register of Heritage Places

Register of the National Estate
- Designated: 21 March 1978

Western Australia Heritage Register
- Type: Shire of Serpentine-Jarrahdale Municipal Inventory
- Designated: 31 July 2000
- Reference no.: 3307

Lowlands Homestead is a group of heritage buildings in the locality of Mardella, in the Shire of Serpentine-Jarrahdale, Western Australia.

The origins of the homestead date back to the 1830s, Thomas Peel and the Peel Estate.

== History ==
The area around the Lowlands Homestead has been described as the only sizeable section of good land in the Peel Estate. Known as Serpentine Farm and located on the Serpentine River, the property was originally owned by Thomas Peel, who gave it to his son Tom as a present. The younger Peel had the first building at the site erected in the 1830s, a hut, located west of the current buildings and no longer in existence. A wooden barn was erected in the 1840s and a house in 1845. A second house was added by him in 1859.

Peel unsuccessfully planted an orchard at his farm and, although the trees never thrived, it was reported in 1954 that one of his original apple trees was still alive and bearing fruit.

Peel declared bankruptcy in 1859 after fire had destroyed his crop of wheat. Serpentine Farm was subsequently sold at auction to John Wellard, who purchased 2,000 hectares (5,000 acres) of land with the homestead for £3,000, equivalent to A$319,282 in 2022. Wellard had arrived in Western Australia in 1841, aged 15, as an apprenticed seaman, with the ship he was on being wrecked at Woodman Point. He based himself in Fremantle and became a successful businessman. Wellard married Ann Woodward in January 1850 and the two had three children, Selina, Ellen and Pierce.

During the 1860s, Wellard added a brick two-storey storehouse, a stable and men's quarters. His household was large, including tradespeople like brick makers and layers. Wellard's daughter Ellen married Alexander Robert Richardson in 1874 and the two initially lived at Pyramid Station, in north-western Western Australia.

In 1876, an indenture between John Wellard, having had to declare bankruptcy, his son Pierce and his son-in-law Richardson saw the latter two jointly purchase Serpentine Farm. This agreement lasted for only a few months, Richardson buying out Pierce Wellard and moving to the farm, renaming it to Lowlands. Richardson subsequently moved into politics, becoming a member of the Legislative Council and, later, the Legislative Assembly, serving as the Minister for Lands.

Richardson's large family, six sons and six daughters, required additions to the homestead, with a large residence added. Richardson retired to South Perth in 1922 and left the property to his two youngest sons, Rupert and Lennox.

Rupert Richardson renamed his part of the holding to Riverlea and eventually subdivided it between two of his sons in 1946, with one property retaining the original name and the other being named Kalga.

Lennox Richardson carried out substantial stabilisation works of the older buildings at Lowlands in the 1950s. On 21 March 1978, Lowlands was listed as a registered place by the Australian Heritage Commission.

In the early 2000s, the bushland around the homestead was designated as a Bush Forever site and, in 2013, the Government of Western Australia purchased the bushland for the purpose of flora and fauna conservation. The area east of the homestead as well as some land to the south-west are now the Lowlands Nature Reserve, having been gazetted on 2 December 2014, officially as the Unnamed WA51784 Nature Reserve.

The Richardson family continues to own the homestead.

== Heritage listing ==
The homestead's heritage listing is based on the cultural heritage significance as very early rural residence. It was built by convict labour from local materials and is associated with early European settlers Thomas Peel and John Wellard.

The architectural style of the buildings varies from Old Colonial through to Victorian Georgian. The buildings have high-pitched broken-back roofs and spreading verandas and are joined by breezeways. The older out-buildings on site are mostly ruins. The main house at Lowlands was reported in 1939 to have 230 metres (250 yd) of verandah, with 84 verandah posts.
