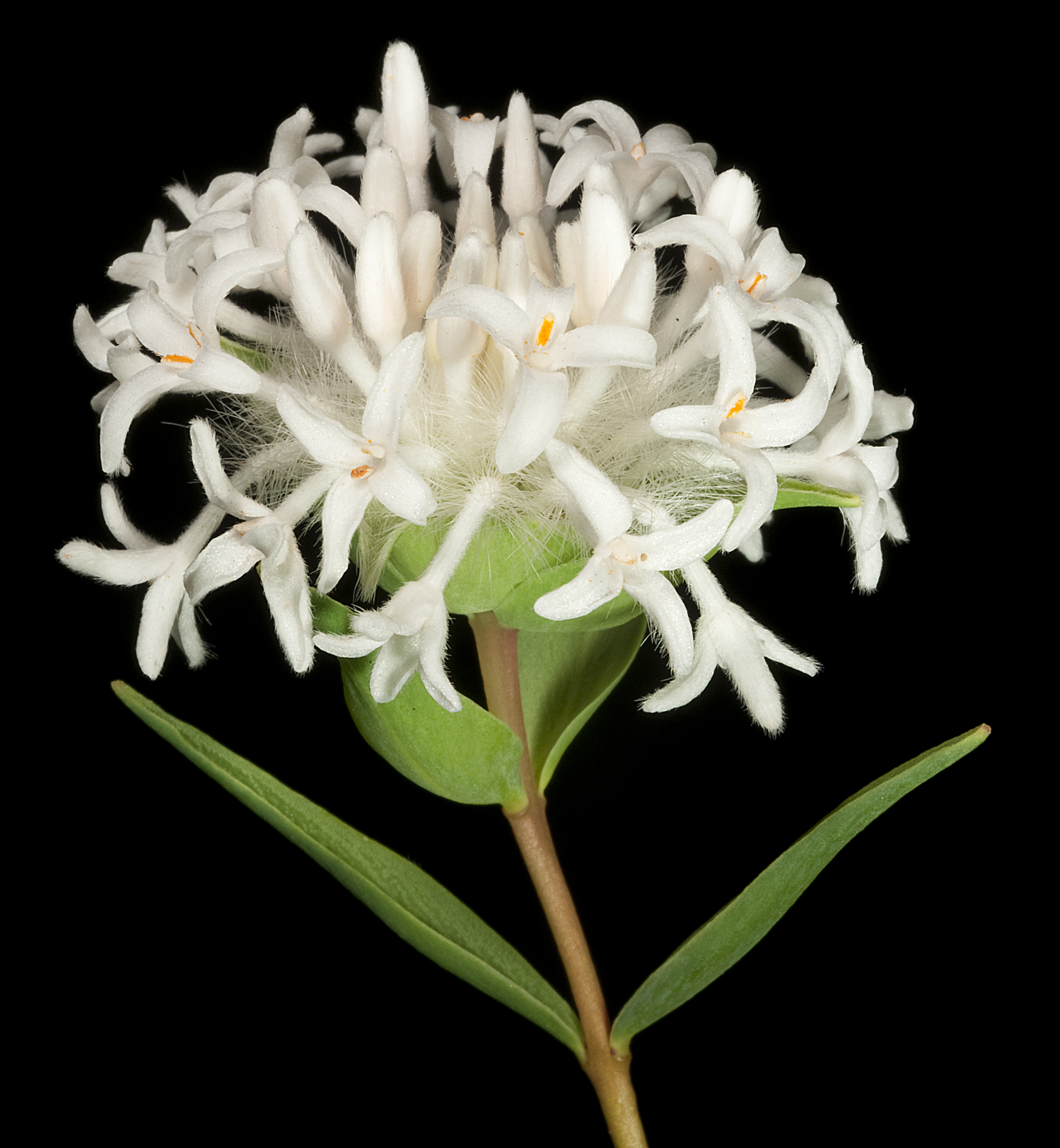

Scientific classification
- Kingdom: Plantae
- Clade: Tracheophytes
- Clade: Angiosperms
- Clade: Eudicots
- Clade: Rosids
- Order: Malvales
- Family: Thymelaeaceae
- Genus: Pimelea
- Species: P. brevistyla

Binomial name
- Pimelea brevistyla Rye

= Pimelea brevistyla =

Species of shrub

Pimelea brevistyla is a species of flowering plant in the family Thymelaeaceae and is endemic to the south-west of Western Australia. It is a shrub with narrowly egg-shaped leaves arranged in opposite pairs, and head-like racemes of white, tube-shaped flowers surrounded by yellowish involucral bracts.

== Description ==
Pimelea brevistyla is a shrub that typically grows to a height of 0.3–1.5 m (1 ft 0 in – 4 ft 11 in). The leaves are narrowly egg-shaped, 7–28 mm (0.28–1.10 in) long, 2.0–3.5 mm (0.079–0.138 in) wide and more or less sessile with the edges curved downwards. The flowers are white, and borne in head-like racemes surrounded by 2, 4 or 6 involucral bracts 8–22 mm (0.31–0.87 in) long, each flower on a hairy pedicel about 1 mm (0.039 in) long. The floral tube is 6–10 mm (0.24–0.39 in) long, the sepals white and spreading, 3–6 mm (0.12–0.24 in) long and hairy on the outside. Flowering occurs from August to October.

== Taxonomy ==
Pimelea brevistyla was first formally described in 1984 by Barbara Lynette Rye in the journal Nuytsia from specimens collected in Glen Forrest in 1983. The specific epithet (brevistyla) means "short style".

In a later edition of the journal Nuytsia, Rye described two subspecies of P. brevistyla and the names are accepted by the Australian Plant Census:

- Pimelea brevistyla Rye subsp. brevistyla has involucral bracts 12–20 mm (0.47–0.79 in) long, the floral tube 11–15 mm (0.43–0.59 in) long and sepals 4.5–6 mm (0.18–0.24 in) long.
- Pimelea brevistyla subsp. minor Rye has involucral bracts 7–11 mm (0.28–0.43 in) long, the floral tube 8–11 mm (0.31–0.43 in) long and sepals 3–4 mm (0.12–0.16 in) long.

== Distribution and habitat ==
Subspecies brevistyla mainly grows in lateritic or granitic soil and is found on the Darling Range between Glen Forrest and Serpentine Falls in the Jarrah Forest and Swan Coastal Plain, and subspecies minor in sandy soil from Wubin to Hyden in the Avon Wheatbelt and Mallee bioregions of south-western Western Australia.

== Conservation status ==
Both subspecies of P. brevistyla are listed as "not threatened" by the Government of Western Australia Department of Biodiversity, Conservation and Attractions.
