= Lowlands Nature Reserve =

Nature reserve in Western Australia

- IUCN category Ia (strict nature reserve)
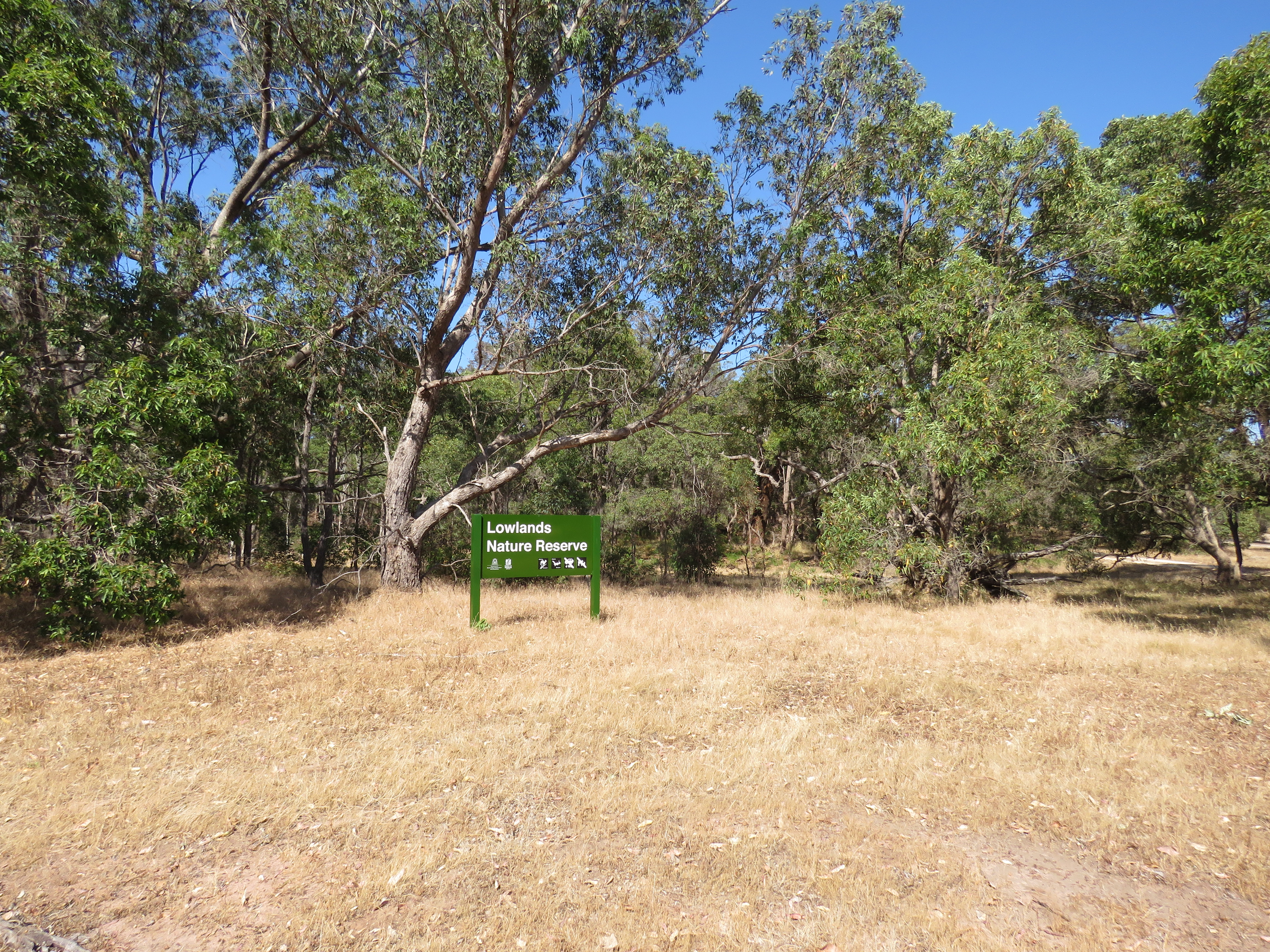
- Signage at the eastern access of Lowlands Nature Reserve

- Location within Western Australia
- Location: Western Australia
- Nearest city: Perth
- Coordinates: 32.322525°S 115.912811°E
- Area: 1,312 ha (5.07 sq mi)
- Established: 2014

Lowlands Nature Reserve is located in the Swan Coastal Plain bioregion of Western Australia, on the Serpentine River. While local signage and operational guidelines identify it as Lowlands Nature Reserve, official maps refer to the nature reserve as Unnamed WA51784 Nature Reserve.

== Overview ==
Lowlands Nature Reserve was gazetted on 2 December 2014 and has a size of 13.12 square kilometres (5.07 mi^{2}).

The nature reserve is located in the west of the locality of Mardella, in the Shire of Serpentine-Jarrahdale. It consists of three separate sections, with the two eastern ones separated by the narrow Lowlands Road corridor while the third section is approximately 1 kilometre (0.62 mi) further west, centered around Hymus Swamp.

The heritage listed Lowlands Homestead, dating back to 1830, is located at the western end of the Lowlands Road corridor, just outside the nature reserve. Originally known as the Serpentine Farm, it was renamed to Lowlands in 1876. In 1978, the Australian Heritage Commission certified Lowlands as a registered place. In the early 2000s, the bushland around the homestead was designated as a Bush Forever site and, in 2013, the Western Australian state government purchased the bushland for the purpose of flora and fauna conservation.

In 2017, a male western quoll was spotted at Lowlands, which is considered unusual given that the nature reserve is surrounded by agricultural land.
