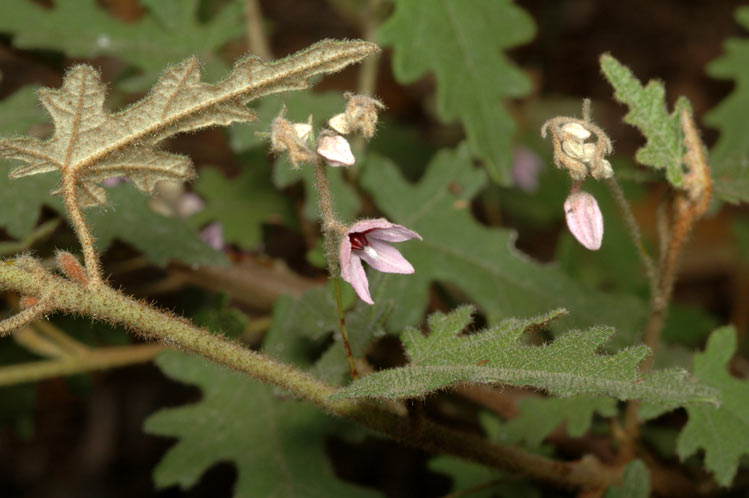
- In Kings Park, Perth

Conservation status
- Endangered (EPBC Act)

Scientific classification
- Kingdom: Plantae
- Clade: Tracheophytes
- Clade: Angiosperms
- Clade: Eudicots
- Clade: Rosids
- Order: Malvales
- Family: Malvaceae
- Genus: Lasiopetalum
- Species: L. pterocarpum

Binomial name
- Lasiopetalum pterocarpum E.M.Benn. & K.A.Sheph.

= Lasiopetalum pterocarpum =

Species of plant

Lasiopetalum pterocarpum, commonly known as wing-fruited lasiopetalum, is a species of flowering plant in the family Malvaceae and is endemic to a restricted area in the south-west of Western Australia. It is an open shrub with many densely hairy stems, egg-shaped and lobed leaves and pink and dark red flowers.

== Description ==
Lasiopetalum pterocarpum is an open shrub typically 0.2–1.2 m (1–4 ft) high and 0.2–0.5 m (1–2 ft) wide, its many stems densely covered with rust-coloured and white, star-shaped hairs, at least when young. The leaves are egg-shaped, 25–80 mm (1.0–3.1 in) long and 15–50 mm (0.6–2.0 in) wide on a petiole 4–14 mm (0.16–0.55 in) long, the edges of the leaves lobed. The leaves are covered with white and rust-coloured, star-shaped hairs, but become glabrous with age. The flowers are arranged in loose groups of five to eight on a rusty-hairy peduncle 9–55 mm (0.35–2.17 in) long, each flower on a pedicel 0.6–4 mm (0.024–0.157 in) long with an oblong bract 1.4–3 mm (0.055–0.118 in) long at the base. There is a single bracteole 0.5–0.7 mm (0.020–0.028 in) long at the base of the sepals. The sepals are pink with a dark red to purple base, the lobes 5.7–8.0 mm (0.22–0.31 in) long, and hairy on the back. There are no petals, the anthers are dark purple, 1.4–1.8 mm (0.055–0.071 in) long on filaments about 1 mm (0.039 in) long. Flowering occurs from August to December and the fruit have six or more distinct wings.

== Taxonomy ==
Lasiopetalum pterocarpum was first formally described in 2006 by Eleanor Marion Bennett and Kelly Anne Shepherd in the journal Nuytsia from specimens collected in Serpentine National Park in 1995. The specific epithet (pterocarpum) means "winged fruit".

== Distribution and habitat ==
This lasiopetalum is only known from a single population in Serpentine National Park, where it grows in woodland on sloping banks and near creeks.

== Conservation status ==
Lasiopetalum pterocarpum is listed as "endangered" under the Australian Government Environment Protection and Biodiversity Conservation Act 1999 and as Threatened" by the Western Australian Government Department of Biodiversity, Conservation and Attractions, meaning that it is in danger of extinction.
