= Serpentine Dam =

Serpentine Dam may refer to:

- Serpentine Dam (Tasmania), the dam used to contain Lake Pedder in Tasmania, Australia
- Serpentine Dam (Western Australia), the water-supply dam for Perth, in Western Australia
- Serpentine Pipehead Dam, part of the water-supply dam in Western Australia
