= Serpent =

Serpent or The Serpent may refer to:

- Snake, a carnivorous reptile of the suborder Serpentes

== Mythology and religion ==
- Sea serpent, a monstrous ocean creature
- Serpent symbolism, the snake in religious rites and mythological contexts
- Serpents in the Bible, notably one in the Old Testament Garden of Eden
- Snakes in Chinese mythology
- Snakes in mythology

== Arts and entertainment ==
- Serpent (novel), a 1999 novel by Clive Cussler
- Serpent (roller coaster), a steel roller coaster at Six Flags AstroWorld
- Serpent (video game), a 1990 Game Boy action video game
- The Serpent, a play created by The Open Theater
- "The Serpent" (Da Vinci's Demons), second episode of the American TV series Da Vinci's Demons
- The Serpent (novel), a 1963 novel by Jane Gaskell
- "The Serpent" (Once Upon a Time in Wonderland), an episode of the series Once Upon a Time in Wonderland
- The Serpent (TV series), a 2021 miniseries co-produced by BBC One and Netflix

=== Film ===
- Le Serpent, a 1973 French film released in English as Night Flight from Moscow
- The Serpent (1916 film), starring Theda Bara
- The Serpent (1920 film), a 1920 Italian silent film
- The Serpent (2006 film), a French film Le Serpent
- The Serpent, a 2021 film produced, directed and starring Gia Skova

=== Music ===
- Serpent (instrument), a Renaissance wind instrument
- Serpent, heavy metal band featuring Piotr Wawrzeniuk
- Serpent (album), 2011 album by Circle
- The Serpent (album), 2007 album by Still Remains, or the title track
- "The Serpent", a song from the 1969 Genesis album From Genesis to Revelation
- The Serpent and the King, a song by Judas Priest
- Thy Serpent, a Finnish black metal band
- Grand Serpent Rising, 2026 album by Dimmu Borgir

== Computing ==
- One of the programming languages used in Ethereum
- Serpent (cipher), in cryptography
- Serpent (software), a continuous-energy Monte Carlo particle transport code

== Constellations ==
- Hydra (constellation), the many-headed serpent killed by Heracles
- Hydrus, the water snake, is a minor southern constellation
- Serpens, which represents a snake being tamed by the snake-handler Ophiuchus

== Toponyms ==
- Serpent Lake, a lake in Minnesota, US
- Serpent River, a tributary of the Mégiscane River in Quebec, Canada

== Other uses ==
- Charles Sobhraj (born 1944), serial killer nicknamed "The Serpent"
- HMS Serpent, several British Royal Navy ships
- Serpent Model Racing Cars, a radio-controlled car manufacturer from the Netherlands

== See also ==
- Dragon (disambiguation)
- Serpentine (disambiguation)
- Serpentor, a fictional character from the G.I. Joe: A Real American Hero cartoon series
- Serpiente, ring name for Mexican-American professional wrestler Melissa Cervantes (born 1986)
- Snake (disambiguation)
- The Serpent Queen, American historical drama television series
- World Serpent (disambiguation)
