= Serpentina =

Serpentina may refer to:

- Serpentina (album), by Banks, 2022
- Serpentina (comics), an X-Men character
- Ulmus × hollandica 'Serpentina', an elm cultivar

== See also ==
- Serpentine (disambiguation)
