= Serpentine Pipehead Dam =

Dam in Western Australia

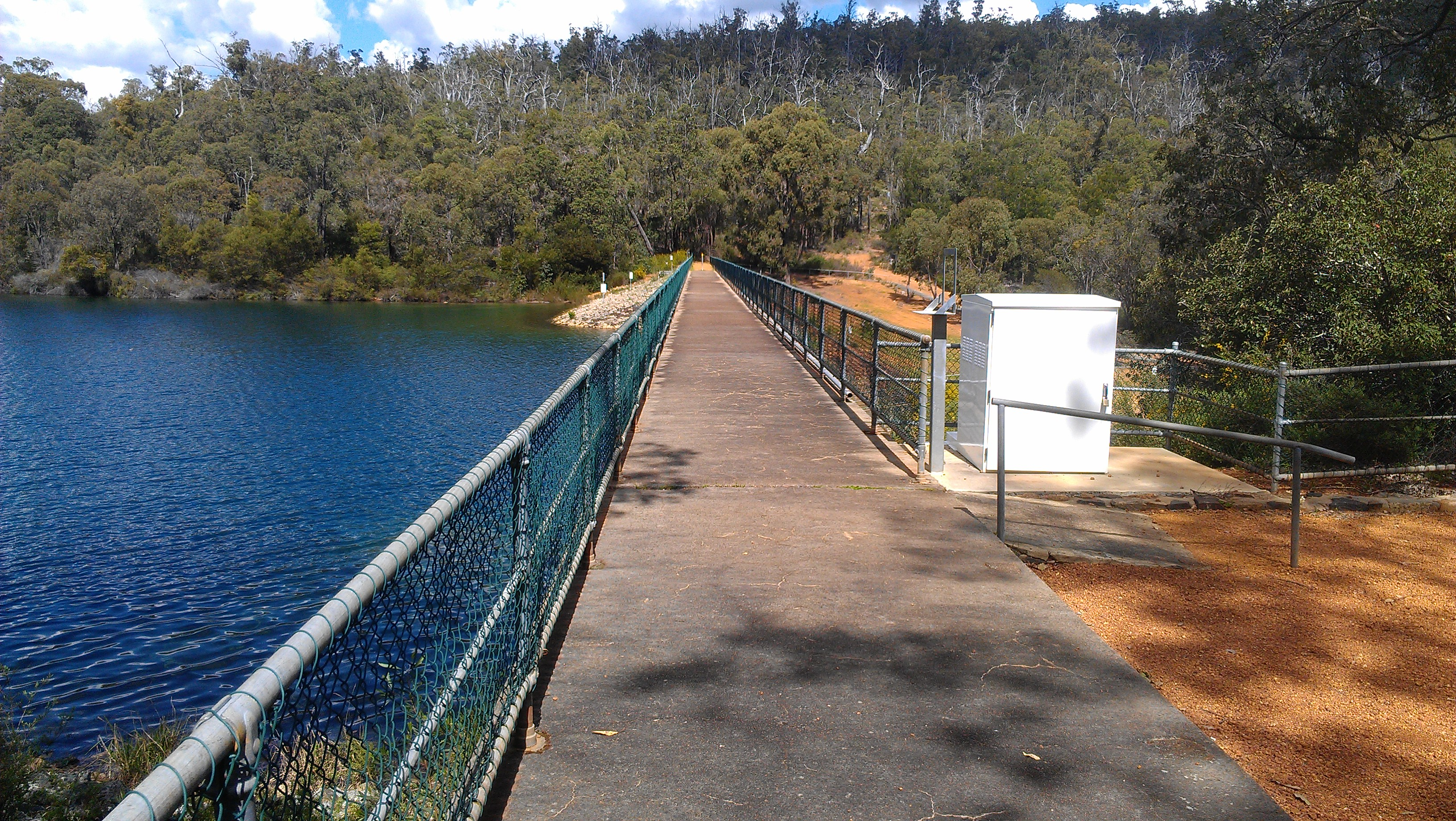
- The dam wall in 2014

- Location of the dam in Western Australia
- Interactive map of Serpentine Pipehead Dam
- Country: Australia
- Location: Jarrahdale, Shire of Serpentine-Jarrahdale, Western Australia
- Coordinates: 32°22′26″S 116°03′31″E
- Purpose: Water supply
- Status: Operational
- Construction began: 1950
- Opening date: 1957
- Built by: Metropolitan Water Authority, Perth
- Operator: Water Corporation

Dam and spillways
- Type of dam: Gravity and embankment dam
- Impounds: Serpentine River
- Height (foundation): 16 m (52 ft)
- Length: 148 m (486 ft)
- Dam volume: 15×10^{3} m^{3} (530×10^{3} cu ft)
- Spillway capacity: 685 m^{3}/s (24,200 cu ft/s)

Reservoir
- Total capacity: 3,140 ML (2,550 acre⋅ft)
- Catchment area: 692 km^{2} (267 sq mi)
- Surface area: 28 ha (69 acres)
- Normal elevation: 166 m (545 ft) AHD

The Serpentine Pipehead Dam is an earth-filled embankment and concrete gravity dam across the Serpentine River, in Western Australia. Established in 1957, the dam is connected with the Serpentine Dam and together they supplement the supply of potable water for Water Corporation to provide to greater metropolitan Perth.

== Overview ==
The dam is 16 metres (52 ft) high and 148 metres (486 ft) long. The resultant 3,140-megalitre (2,550 acre⋅ft) reservoir draws from a 692 km^{2} (267 sq mi) catchment area.

The dam is also used to store water from the Dandalup scheme whereby water can be pumped or gravity transferred back into the Serpentine Pipehead Dam. The dam site also contains a water treatment plant and picnic area. The pipehead dam is 7 km (4.3 mi) upstream from Serpentine Falls and was constructed using 5,000 cubic metres (180,000 cu ft) of concrete and 10,000 cubic metres (350,000 cu ft) of earth.

== Gallery ==
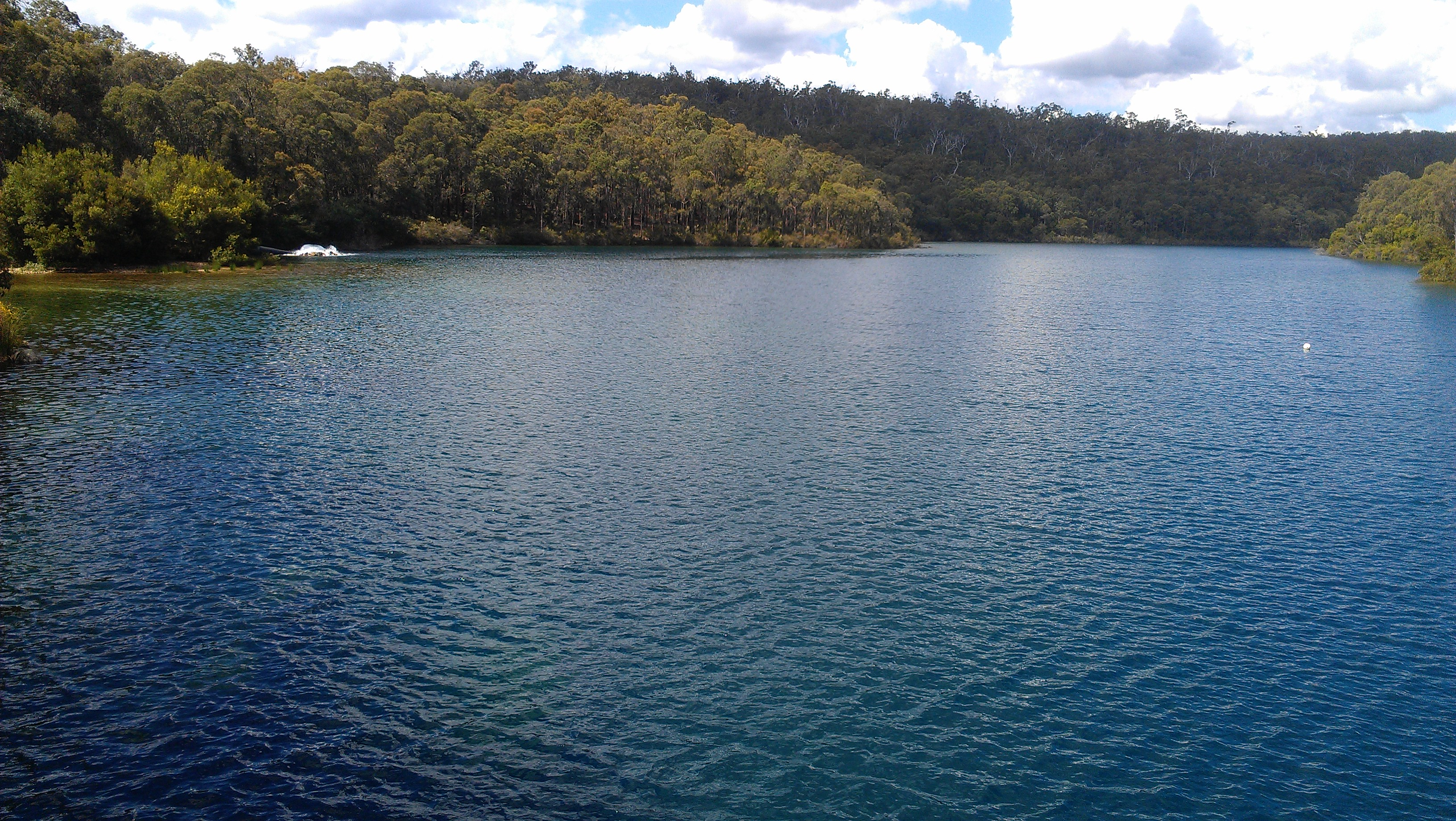
The reservoir

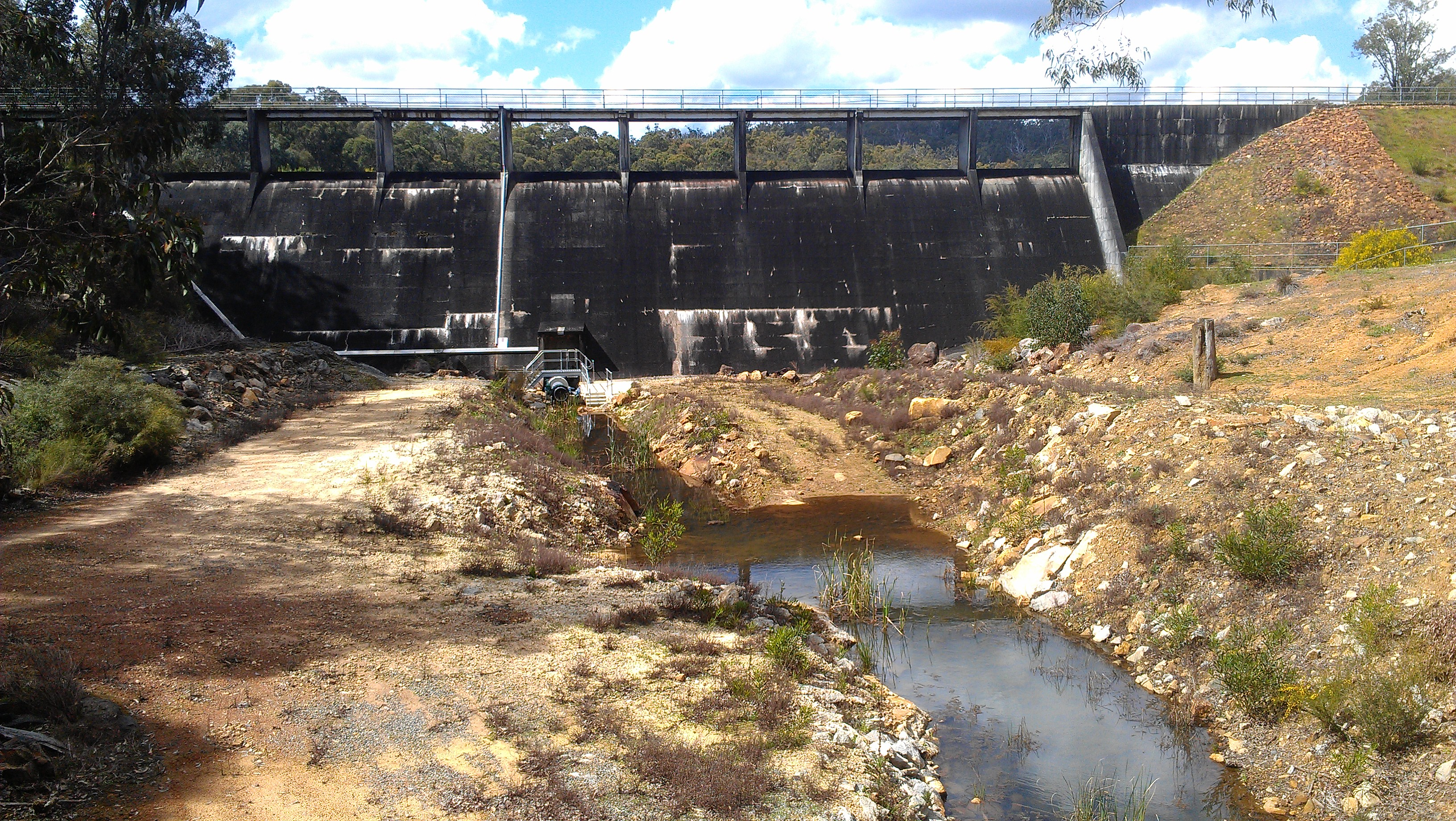
Down river of the dam wall

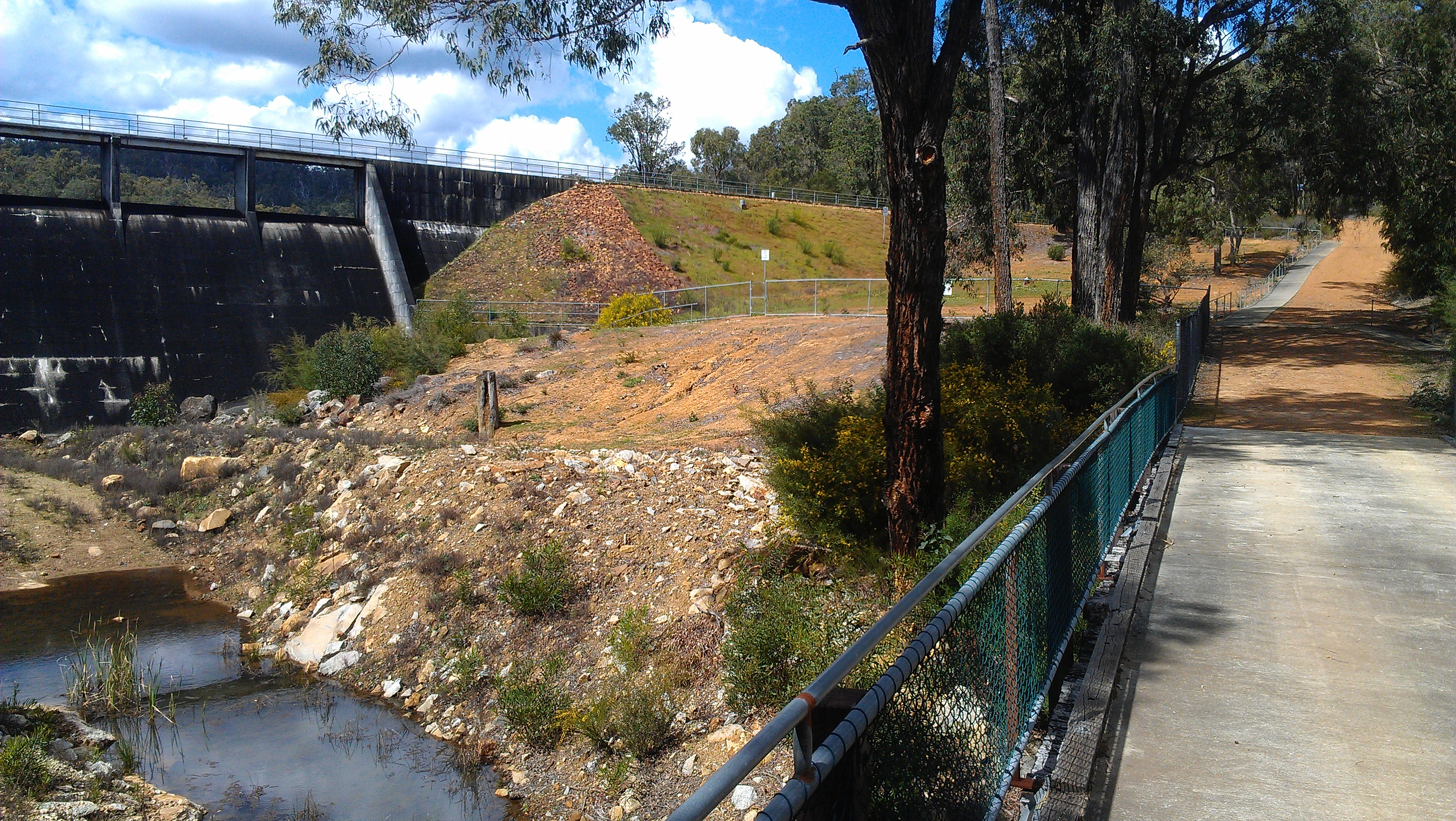
Banks of the reservoir with the dam wall

== See also ==
- List of dams and reservoirs in Australia
