= Serpentine River (New Zealand) =

River in New Zealand

Coordinates: 41°24′S 173°12′E

The Serpentine River is a minor river on the north western flanks of the Richmond Range in the South Island of New Zealand.

It passes through a plantation forest near the town of Richmond before joining the Roding River, eventually emptying into Tasman Bay.
