= Serpentine River (Western Australia) =

River in Western Australia

Coordinates: 32°34′33″S 115°45′39″E

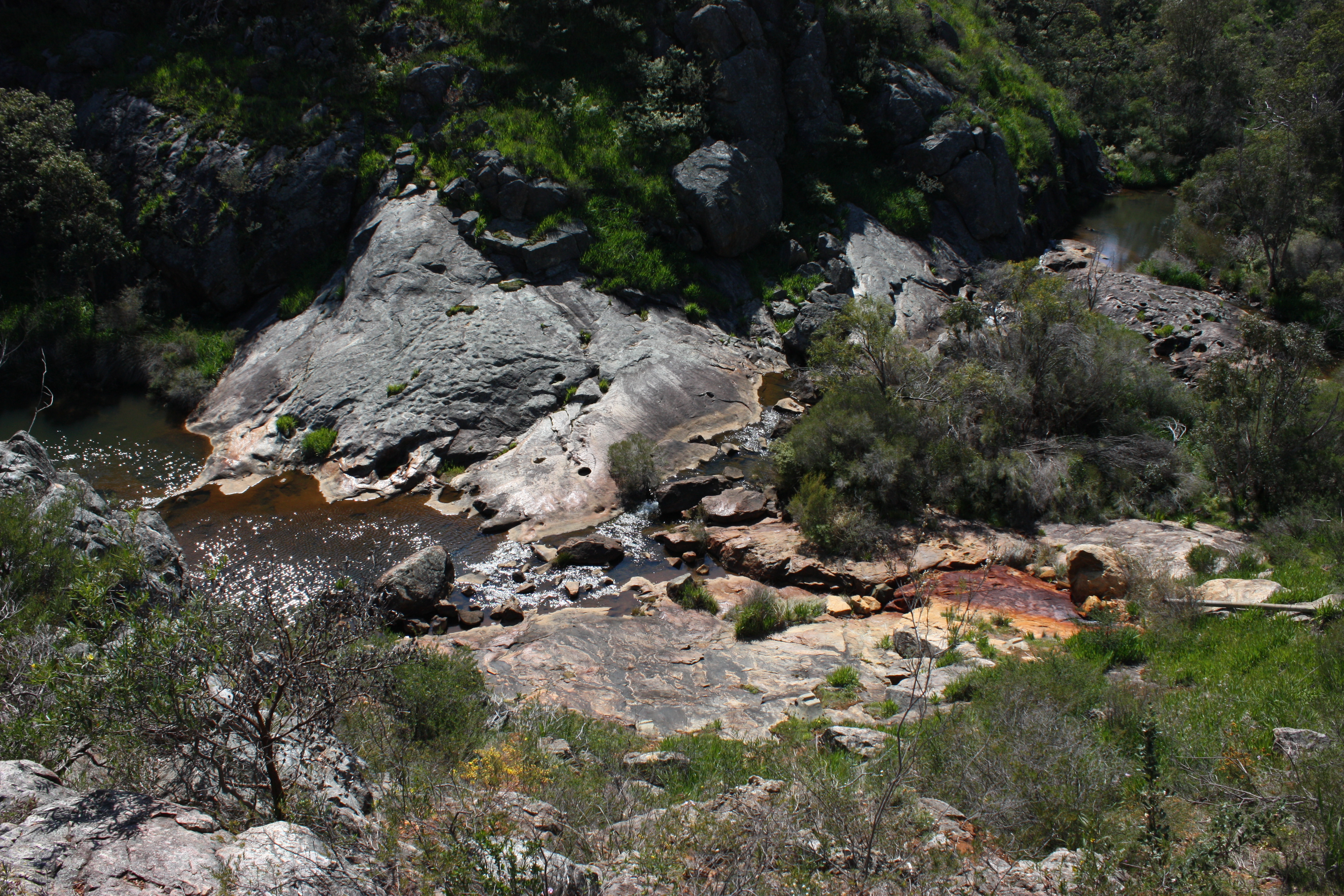

Location
- Country: Australia

Physical characteristics
- Source
  - location: Bowerling Hill
  - elevation: 313 metres (1,027 ft)
- Mouth
  - location: Peel Inlet
  - elevation: sea level
- Length: 111 kilometres (69 mi)

The Serpentine River is a river in the South West region of Western Australia. It is known as Waangaamaap Bilya to the Indigenous Bindjareb people, who met, lived and fished there before British settlement.

The river rises in the Darling Scarp below Bowerling Hill and flows westward crossing Albany Highway north of North Bannister. The river continues northwest through the Youarling State Forest then the Serpentine National Park. The river flows through Serpentine Dam then flows over Serpentine Falls just south of Jarrahdale as it comes off the Scarp and onto the Swan Coastal Plain. The river continues west and crosses the South Western Highway then flows past the town of Serpentine. The river then veers south and continues until it discharges into the Peel Inlet near Mandurah.

The upper reaches of the river flow into Serpentine Dam, which provides drinking water to the Perth metropolitan area.

The only tributary to the Serpentine River is Big Brook. Additionally, the Birrega Main Drain and Peel Main Drain discharge into the Serpentine River at Baldivis and Karnup respectively. The river also flows through Kerulup Pool, Lake Amarillo and Goegrup Lake.

The Lowlands Nature Reserve, situated along the river in Mardella, was declared in 2014.

The river is known to have toxic algal blooms, last occurring in 2007. Algal blooms usually occur after hot weather and in the upper reaches of the river.

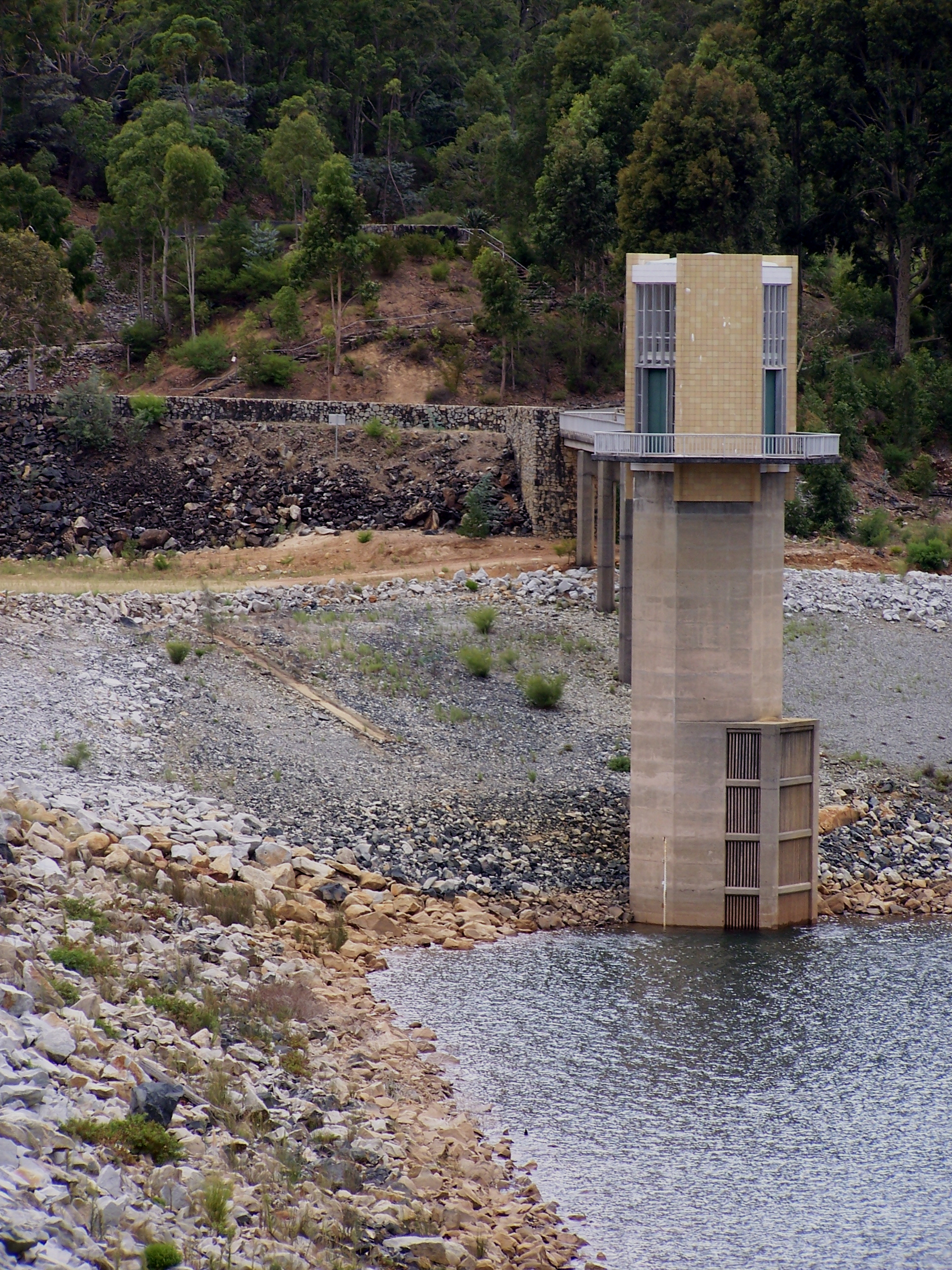
Serpentine Dam

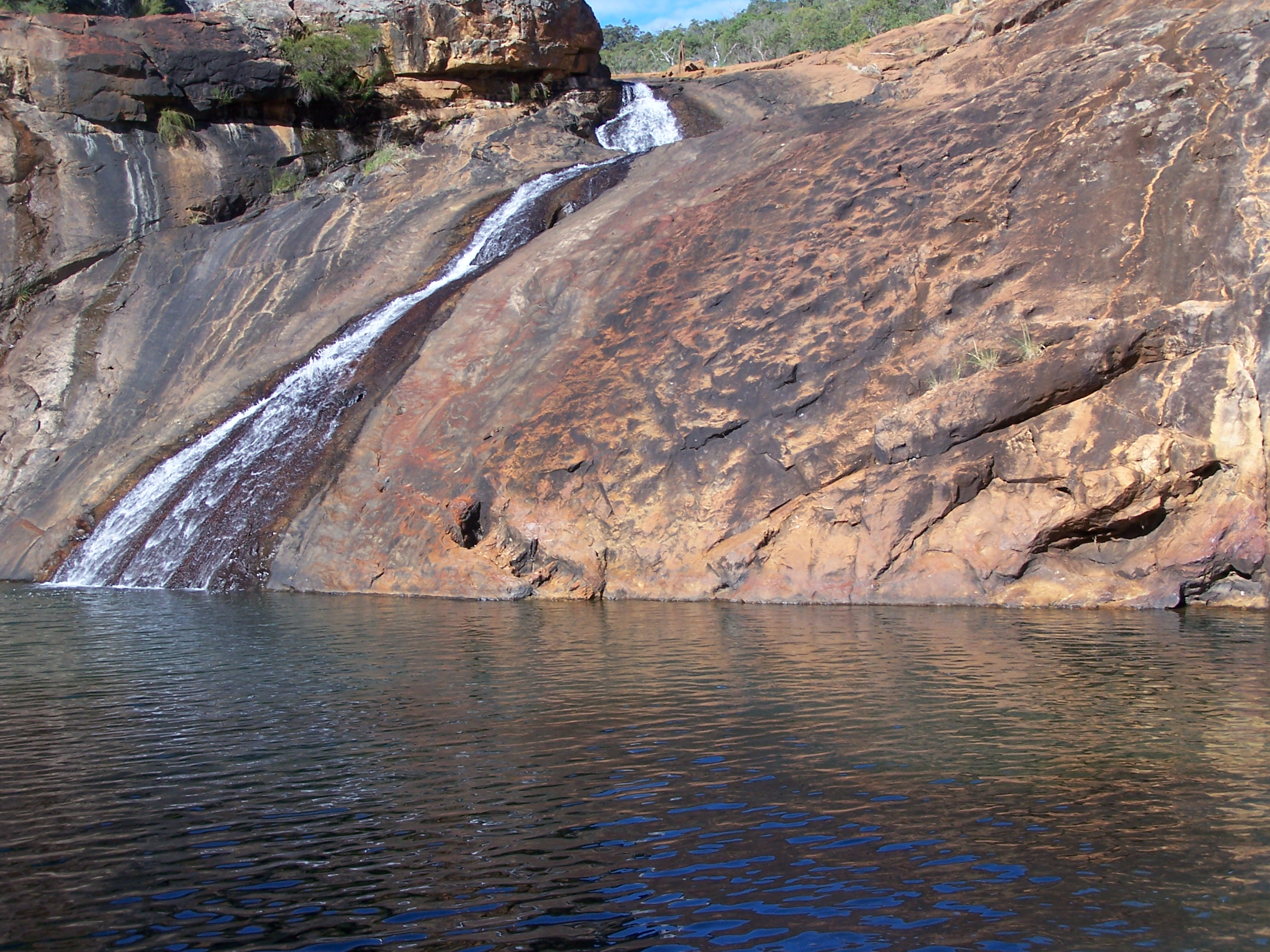
Serpentine Falls
