= Bush Forever =

Western Australian government initiative and plan

Bush Forever is a Government of Western Australia initiative and plan, aimed at preserving a "comprehensive, adequate and representative" 10 percent of each vegetation complex on the Swan Coastal Plain within the Perth metropolitan region. Introduced in 2000, the plan was to achieve this through a network of reserves by 2010.

== History ==
A 1998 Western Australian State of the Environment Report highlighted that the loss of biodiversity and habitats caused by habitat degradation and clearing, human interference and the introduction of pests and weeds was one of Western Australia’s most serious environmental problem.

The concept of Bush Forever dates back to the year 2000, when it was introduced by the Government of Western Australia.

The strategic plan, introduced by the government in December 2000, was to protect regionally significant bush land of the Swan Coastal Plain in 287 Bush Forever sites with a combined area of about 51,200 hectares. All up, Bush Forever sites amounted to 18 percent of the original vegetation of the Swan Coastal Plain within the metropolitan Perth area.

The Western Australian Ministry for Planning was the lead agency for the implementation of Bush Forever. Initially, progress with four permanent employees was to plan but stalled after a few years. Funding of $100 million was allocated by the Western Australian Planning Commission for the acquisition and development of sites, with completion envisioned by 2010.

A 2021 audit found that 99% of the 51,200 hectares identified in 2000 remained intact during a time when the population of Perth grew from 1.4 to two million. However as the city has grown the plan to set aside 10% have not increased the land identified as Bush forever so reducing the quality of life and health of Residents of the Perth Region.

== Threat ==
Despite being classified as Bush Forever, sites have come under threat from development. With the population of metropolitan Perth and the Peel Region projected to grow by 70 percent by 2050, to 3.5 million, this population explosion could potentially threaten Bush Forever sites. The practice of allowing the destruction of some Bush Forever sites by developers in exchange for financial compensation or by environmentally repairing another area was criticised by the Urban Bushland Council of Western Australia.
