= Serpentine Dam (Western Australia) =

Dam in Western Australia

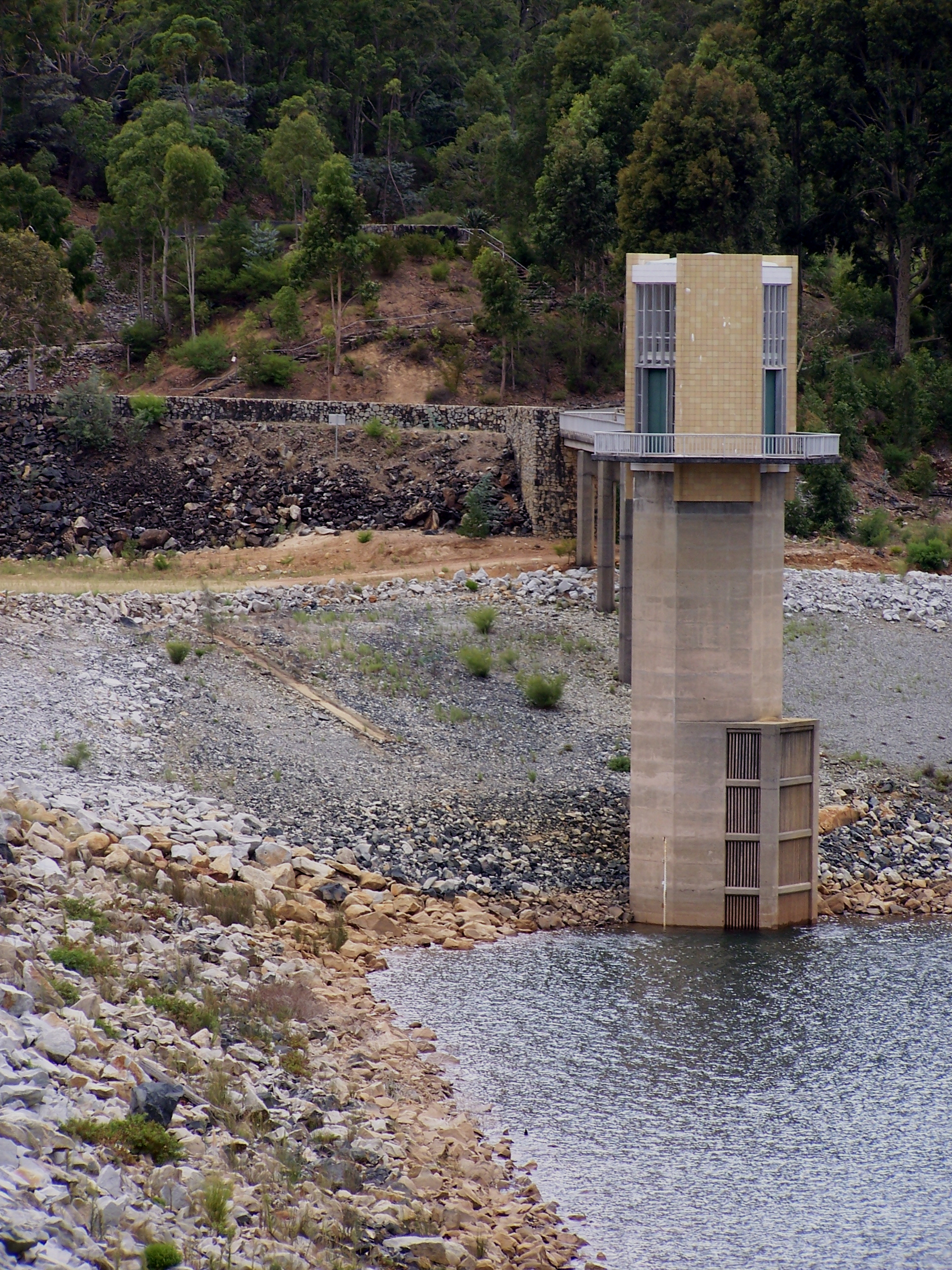
- Dam wall and offtake tower. Water level in picture is 27% of capacity.
- Interactive map of Serpentine Dam
- Location: Serpentine, Shire of Serpentine-Jarrahdale, Western Australia
- Coordinates: 32°24′15″S 116°05′58″E
- Opening date: 1961

Dam and spillways
- Height: 55 m (180 ft)
- Width (base): 350.5 m (1,150 ft)

Reservoir
- Creates: Reservoir
- Total capacity: 137,700,000 m^{3} (4.86×10^{9} ft^{3})
- Catchment area: 664 km^{2} (256 mi^{2})
- Surface area: 5.01 km (3.11 mi)

Western Australia Heritage Register
- Official name: Serpentine Dam
- Designated: 26 September 2003
- Reference no.: 4174

The Serpentine Dam is a major water supply dam for Perth, Western Australia. The dam is used to store water that is released at a controlled rate to regulate the level in the Serpentine Pipehead Dam reservoir, which in turn feeds water to the metropolitan trunk main network depending on demand. Construction of the dam was completed in 1961.

The Serpentine Dam is one of the 15 dams, some of which have since been decommissioned, that have been built in Western Australia since the 1920s, along with the Serpentine Pipehead Dam. It was built as part of the Integrated Water Supply System (IWSS), the largest scheme currently managed by the Water Corporation, which provides water for over two million people in Perth, Mandurah, and other Western Australian regions. Serpentine Dam is connected to the Serpentine Pipehead Dam, which stores water and desalinated water from the Serpentine Dam and other dams nearby for later use.

The Serpentine Dam is an important water source because the Perth metropolitan area depends on it as a strategic water source, supplying on average 39 gigalitres (1.4 billion cubic feet) per year, with an additional 2 gigalitres (71 million cubic feet) from the natural flows into the Serpentine Pipehead Dam. According to the Department of Water and Environmental Regulation, as of 2017 the Serpentine Dam alone has supplied about 4300 households with water annually since 2010.

== History ==
There have been water supply shortage problems in Perth since the Swan River Colony was declared on 2 May 1829. Only the wealthy at the time had rainwater tanks on their house roofs. Others obtained water through shallow wells supplied from the aforementioned rainwater tanks, though they were filled for only a few months annually. Several swamps and lakes and a few freshwater springs were also used as water sources.

With these limited resources, water shortages occurred and the existing water sources became polluted over time. This caused the rapid spread of diseases such as typhoid and diphtheria, especially among less fortunate people, and many became sick.

In 1885, a Sanitation Commission was appointed by the Legislative Council. The first thing the Sanitation Commission did was to stop the use of cesspits and established four main drinking water supply sources; wells that were sunk into the ground, the roofs of houses and tanks preserving water, Lake Monger, Smith's Lake, and other lagoons at the back of Perth, the rivers and brooks supplied from the Darling Scarp. The Sanitation Commission also had plans to obtain a reliable pure drinking water source that would come from water that was piped from the Darling Scarp. These plans, however, fell through due to the projected cost of the project, risk of that water body being contaminated and unsanitary, and the idea seeming appropriate to only serve as local sources of water, not as a major water supply source.

Perth civil engineers Henry John Saunders and James Barratt came up with a comprehensive plan for the city's first water supply scheme (Perth's First Water Supply Scheme) in May 1887. They proposed that water would be sourced from a dam on Munday Brook at Carmel and Canning Mills in the hills, covering an area of 13 hectares (32 acres). They reported that the scheme was meant to have a storage capacity of up to 640 million litres (140 million imperial gallons) of water and would be able to supply up to approximately 25,000 people. The combined population of Perth and Fremantle at the time was only 11,500 people, thus the scheme was to have the capability of supplying each person with about 140 litres (30 imperial gallons) of water daily. This scheme proved to be significant as it paved the way for Perth to grow in response to the state's gold rush, and resolved the water supply shortage issues that they had been experiencing for over 50 years.

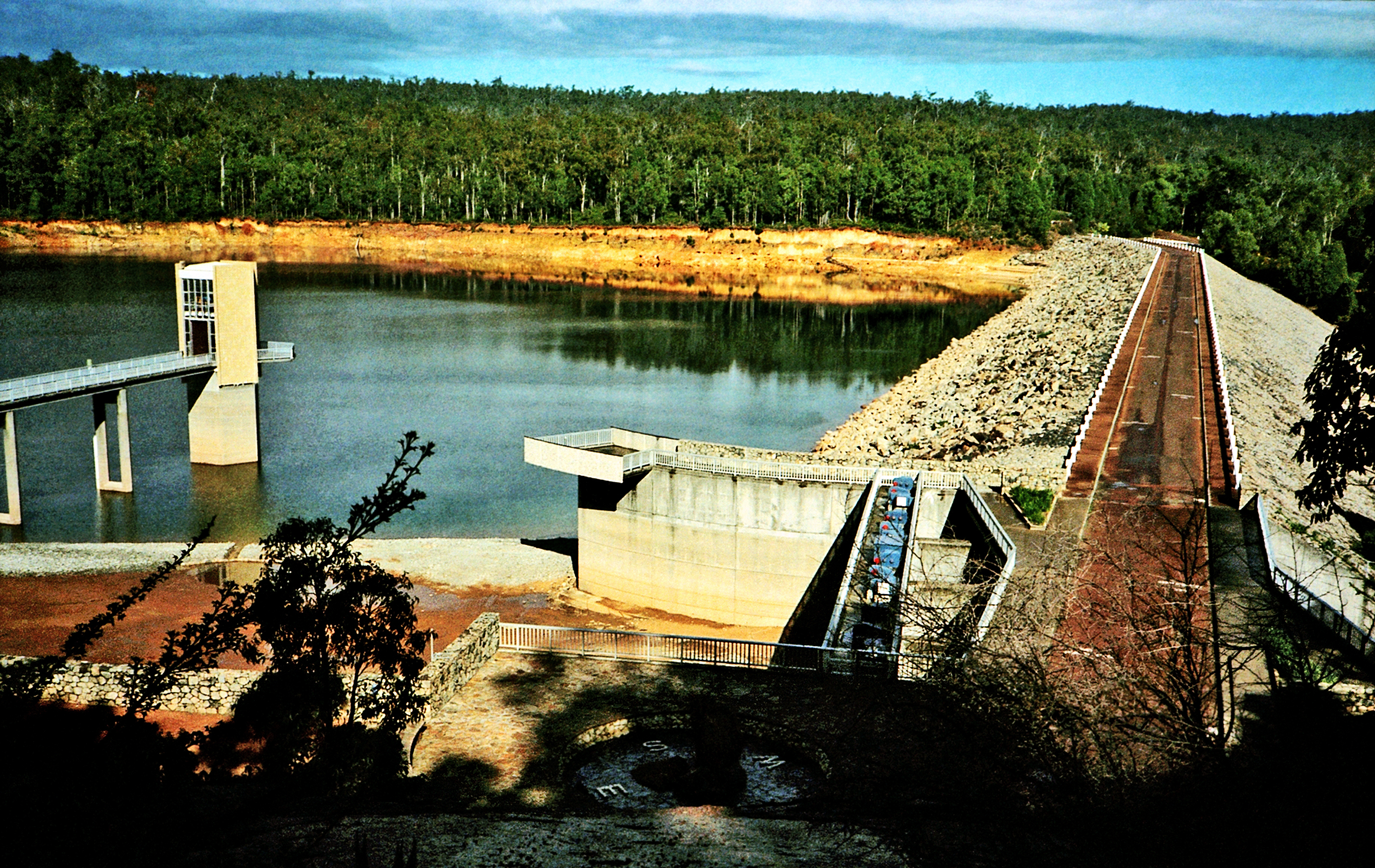
South-west view across the Serpentine Dam

Many dams have been built since the scheme's establishment, and it was an ancestor of all the different water supply schemes in Perth throughout the years, including the Goldfields Water Supply Scheme and the Serpentine Scheme. The Serpentine Scheme eventually resulted in the construction of the Serpentine Dam between 1960–1961 and officially opening to the public in 1961.

== Hydrography ==
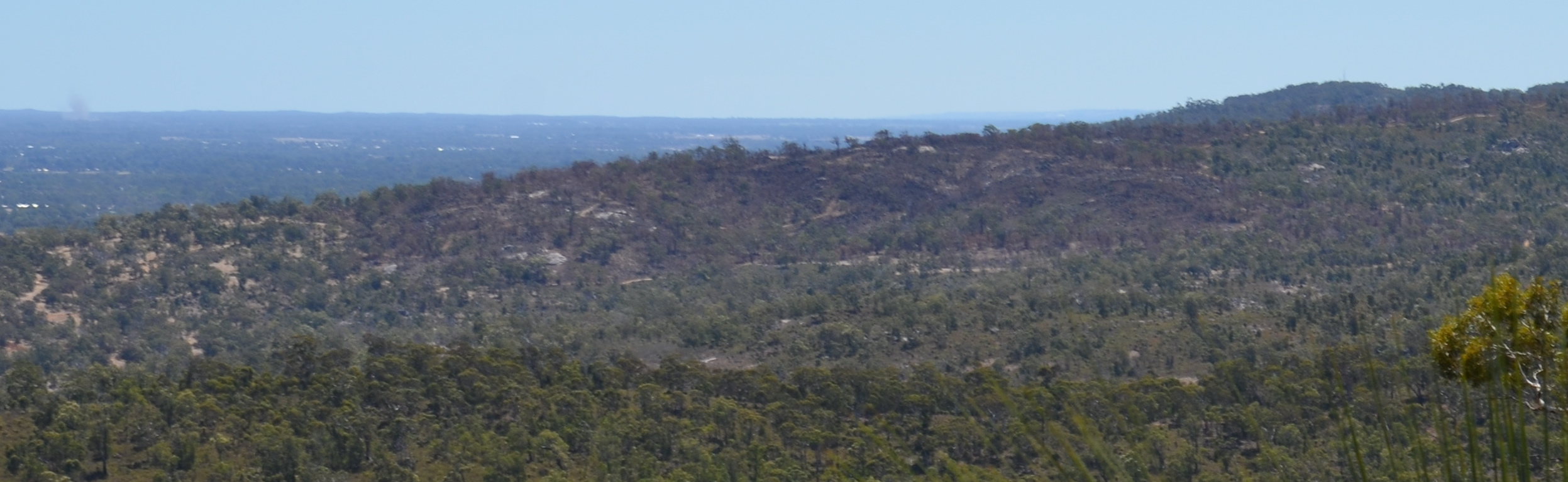
Darling Scarp

The Serpentine Dam catchment is situated in the Darling Plateau within the Darling Scarp, on Kingsbury Drive, around 12 kilometres (7.5 mi) south of Jarrahdale, Western Australia. It forms part of the Archaean Shield covered by open woodland and private land areas that have been cleared for rural and agricultural purposes.

According to the Water Corporation, the Serpentine Dam can hold up to 138 billion litres (4.9 billion cubic feet) of water, has a wall height of 55 metres (180 ft) at the lowest foundation and a reservoir length of 16 kilometres (9.9 mi). The catchment has an area of 664 square kilometres (256 sq mi). The reservoir is at 217 metres (712 ft) Australian Height Datum (AHD) and the highest point of the catchment, Mount Cuthbert is at 582 metres (1,909 ft) AHD on the catchment’s east boundary, based on the Serpentine Dam Catchment Area Drinking Water Source Protection Plan (2007).

Climatically, the area receives around 1,000 millimetres (39 in) of rainfall annually, most falling between May and September. Rainfall varies widely throughout the catchment, from 700 millimetres (28 in) rainfall isohyet in the east up to 1,300 millimetres (51 in) rainfall isohyet in the west.

== Environmental issues ==
=== Streamflow decline ===
Climate change and rainfall declines have affected Western Australia for a long time, affecting water supplies around the area. According to the Department of Water and Environmental Regulation, the Serpentine Dam experienced a 16% drop in rainfall between 1961 and 2008, followed by a further 10% drop for 2008–2015 from the Bureau of Meteorology’s Karnet site. This caused streamflow into the dam to drop by 58%, nearly half between 1989 and 2008. In 2015, both the Serpentine Main and Pipehead dams' combined inflow were at an all-time low of just 1.7 gigalitres (60 million cubic feet), 11.4 gigalitres (400 million cubic feet) for all the IWSS dams. This was an extremely low inflow rate compared to common flows of up to 100–140 gigalitres (3.5–4.9 billion cubic feet) per annum before the mid 1970s, just around when the rainfall decline started. It is predicted that in the future, there will be around a 45% reduction in inflows, in the worst case scenario, up to 70% reduction, and even zero or near-zero inflow into the dams.

In 2011, "water supplies in Perth and the South West ... reached critically low levels after almost a year with no significant rain." The Water Corporation stated that Perth needed 176 billion litres (6.2 billion cubic feet) of water that year just to meet demand, otherwise restrictions would have to be enforced to households and industry to accommodate the city.

=== Bauxite mining ===
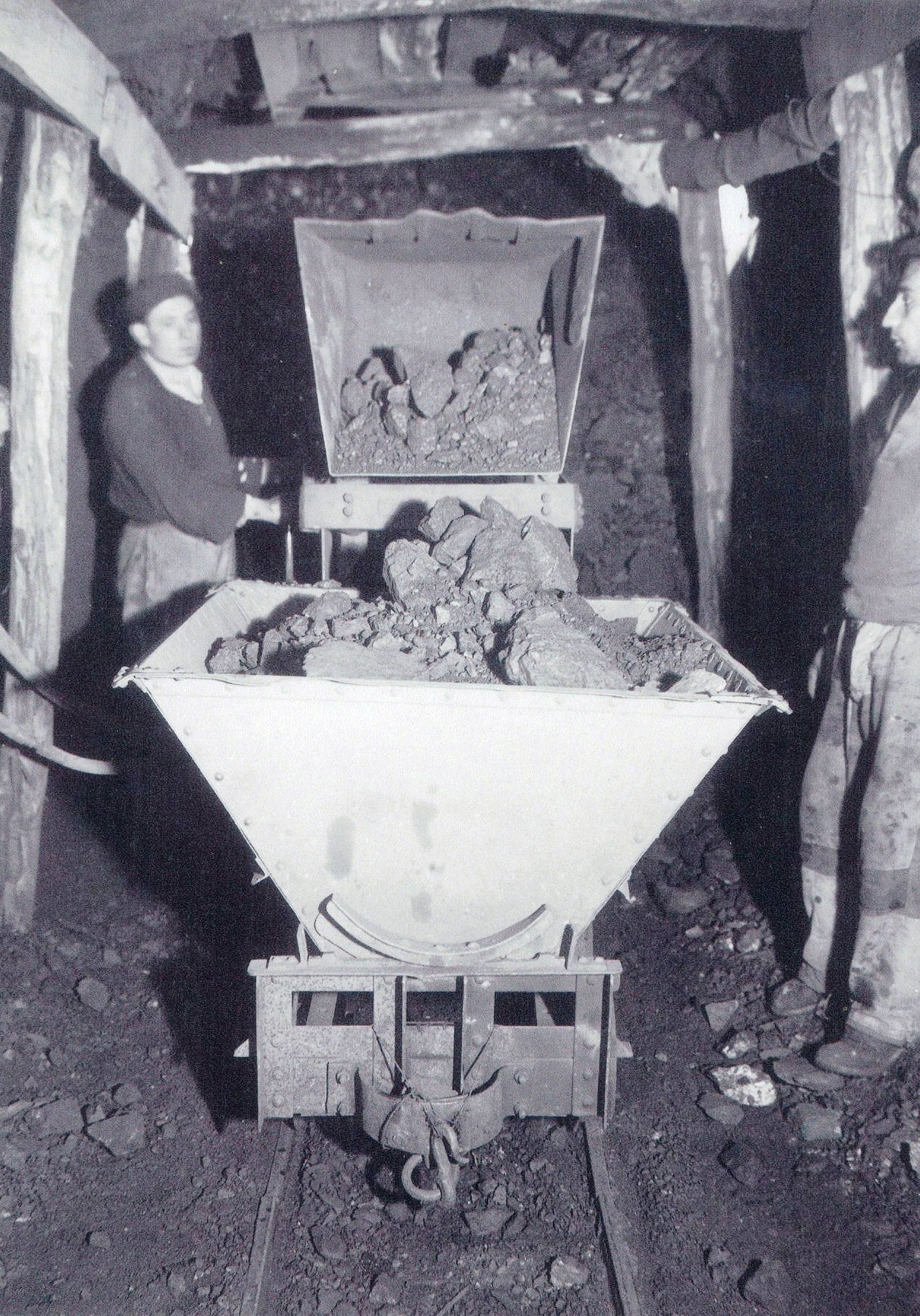
Extraction of bauxite

Most of the dam catchments that are connected to the IWSS are located in the south-western area of Western Australia. Alcoa has mined in these catchments to obtain bauxite ore since 1963. The mining has significantly affected the northern Jarrah forest, including the Serpentine catchment as the mining process requires clearing forests, soil stripping in two layers, blasting of lateritic duricrust and finally removal of broken duricrust with the underlying friable bauxite. The lost forest area is estimated to be replaced by 2032 as they have started to replant the lost forest area throughout the years with a prescription of 1300 tree stems per one hectare (2.5 acres). Consequently annual inflow to the Serpentine Dam was projected to increase by 3.5% in 2011–2030, but decrease overall by 4.5% in 2030–2050.

=== Potential water quality risks ===
Pathogens are always a threat to water supply sources since they pose as a significant risk to public health, its effects on people range from illness up to even death, so water treatment regularly occurs in the Serpentine Dam catchment. Water treatment in the catchment can be directly affected by the land use activities that occur in and around the area. For example, off-road driving on unauthorised tracks contribute to erosion in the area. Erosion affects the soil particles within the catchment and causes them to increase the turbidity in the air. In turn, existing pathogens can adsorb these soil particles and can potentially resist disinfection better, thus increasing the risk of contamination of the water in the catchment. Other effects include the uprooting of vegetation, affecting plant growth, and smothering of riparian vegetation.

== Land uses ==
=== Private land ===
There is approximately 1,355 hectares (3,350 acres) of private land in the south-east edge of the Serpentine Dam catchment. This private land is used for Tasmanian bluegum (Eucalyptus globulus) plantations, private dams, and some pasture and remnant native vegetation. In 2007, a large chunk of this land was sold to a Boddington Gold Mine (BGM) venture that planned to expand gold mines near Boddington disturbing the State Forest around the area. To get around this issue, BGM traded with the Department of Environment and Conservation other plots of land that had a similar size and conservation value to make up for the State Forest that would be disturbed from the BGM expansion project. This land eventually became Crown Land that would be managed by the Department of Environment and Conservation (Western Australia).

=== Crown land ===
The Serpentine Dam catchment lies within State Forests Number 14 and 67. The State Forests are managed by the Department of Environment and Conservation and currently used for nature conservation, recreation, timber production, and has many other purposes.

Bauxite mining is also conducted in a part of the Crown Land in the catchment, the area in which the bauxite mining is done is planned to expand in the future.

105 hectares (260 acres) of the Crown Land is used for Frollett pine plantation in the north side of the catchment. The plantation is harvested when the time is right.

Other uses for the Crown Land include the Albany Highway passing through the Serpentine catchment, and the Muja Northern Terminal Line, a major Western Power transmission line. also passes through the Serpentine catchment.

The Serpentine National Park is considered part of the catchment, being part of two-thirds of the Serpentine Pipehead Dam catchment.

== Recreation ==
Recreation in the State forest and National Parks is managed by the Department of Environment and Conservation. The catchment has numerous recreation activities like hiking, which happens throughout the catchment, specifically along the Bibbulmun Track which passes through the catchment around 25 kilometres (16 mi) upstream of the Serpentine Dam. The area is home to the Monadnocks Campsite and the White Horse Hills Campsite.

Other approved significant recreational activities include orienteering, rogaining, picnicking, and mountain biking.

The Munda Biddi Mountain Bike Trail passes through the north of the Serpentine Dam catchment area.

The Water Corporation operates a picnic area directly downstream of the Serpentine Dam catchment area.

The Western Australian Endurance Riders Association have held annual horse-riding events in the north-west side of the catchment.

The Darling 200 Rally run by the Light Car Club of WA Inc. under Motorsport Australia, previously known as the Confederation of Australian Motor Sport also used to regularly hold established motor events in the spring in the Serpentine catchment.

Unauthorised activities include swimming, boating, and fishing.

== Future ==
The Serpentine Dam is intended to go on supplying the Perth metropolitan area and other regions in Western Australia with drinking water. With the varying seasons and likelihood of drier years into the future from rainfall reduction due to climate change, and as demand increases, the government of Western Australia, along with landholders will need to consider developing additional water sources on top of the current existing IWSS dams to meet future water demands.

== See also ==
- Canning Dam
