= Serpentine National Park =

National park in Western Australia

- IUCN category II (national park)
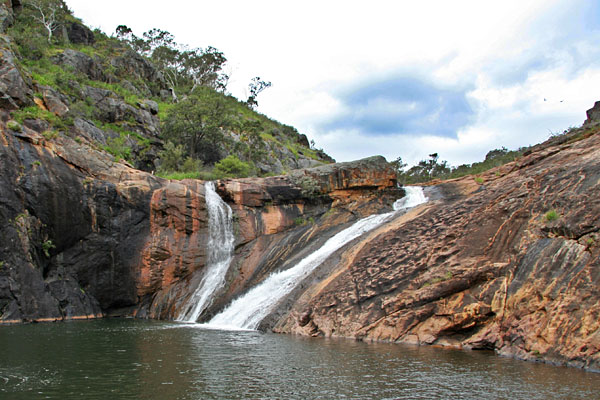
- Main section of the Serpentine Falls, 2007

- Location within Western Australia
- Location: Western Australia
- Nearest city: Perth
- Coordinates: 32°21′26″S 116°02′36″E
- Area: 43.87 km^{2} (16.94 sq mi)
- Established: 1957
- Governing body: WA Department of Parks and Wildlife
- Website: Official website

The Serpentine National Park is a national park located on the Darling Scarp, approximately 55 kilometres (34 mi) southeast of Perth in Western Australia.

== Features and location ==
The 4,387-hectare (10,840-acre) national park's main feature and most popular tourist destination is the Serpentine Falls, a series of waterfalls in the upper reaches of the Serpentine River. Serpentine falls are located at 32°22′05″S 116°00′40″E. Other attractions include Serpentine Dam and the smaller Pipehead Dam. The park overlaps the North Dandalup Important Bird Area.

The Park was expanded on several occasions to the north of the Serpentine River, including recently in the mid and late 2000s. This included land which was formerly managed by the Shire of Serpentine Jarrahdale as State Forest and Regional Parks, and land under the management of the Water Corporation. Gooralong Camping and Day Use Area was closed in the mid-2000s in conjunction with this acquisition. The park was proclaimed as a National Park in 1957.

== Flora and fauna ==
In spring the park is abundant with wildflowers. Common species found here include spider orchids, greenhoods and triggerplants. Giant sundew, dryandras and grevilleas are other common species found in this area.

== Gallery ==
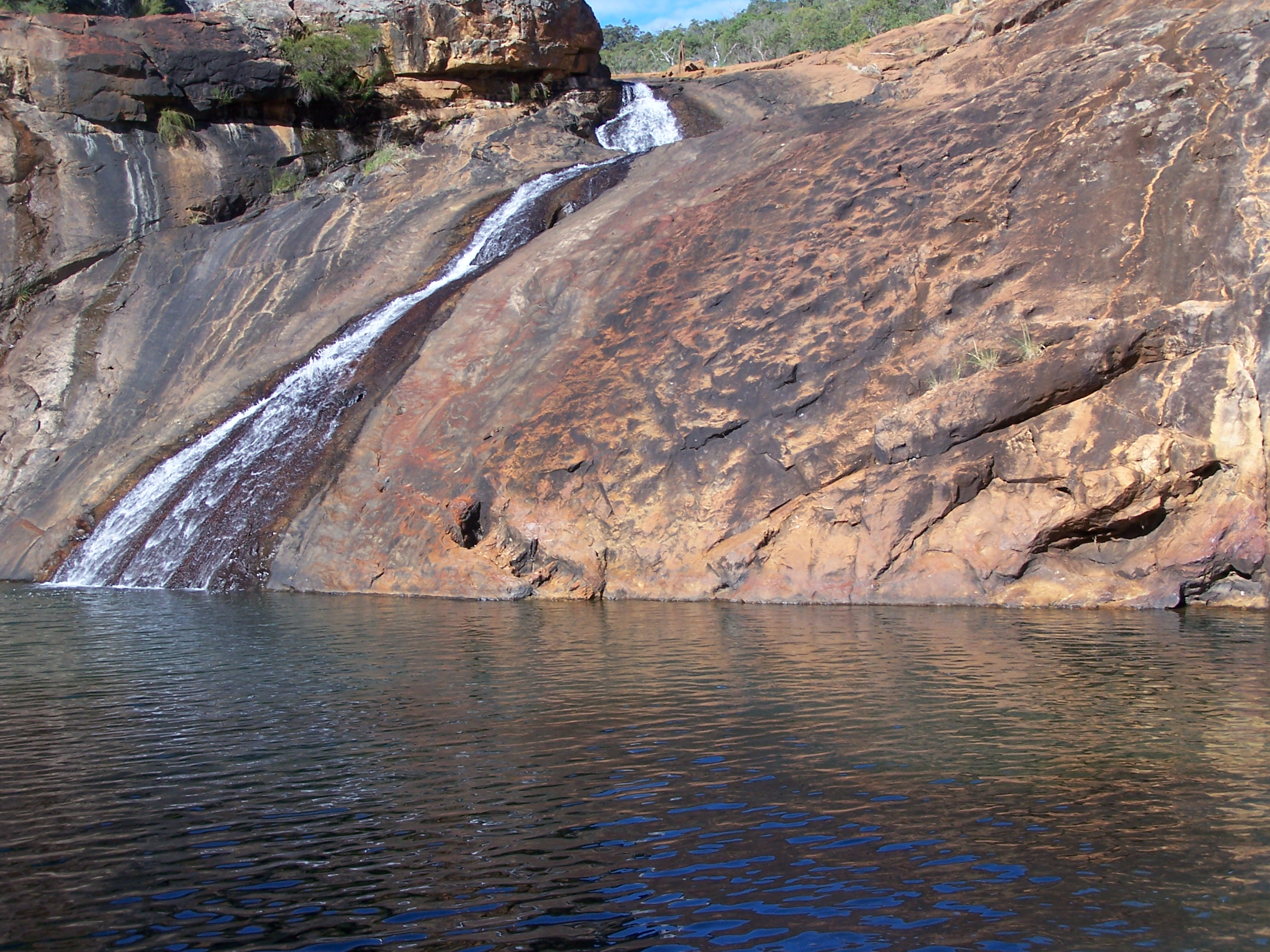
April 2006

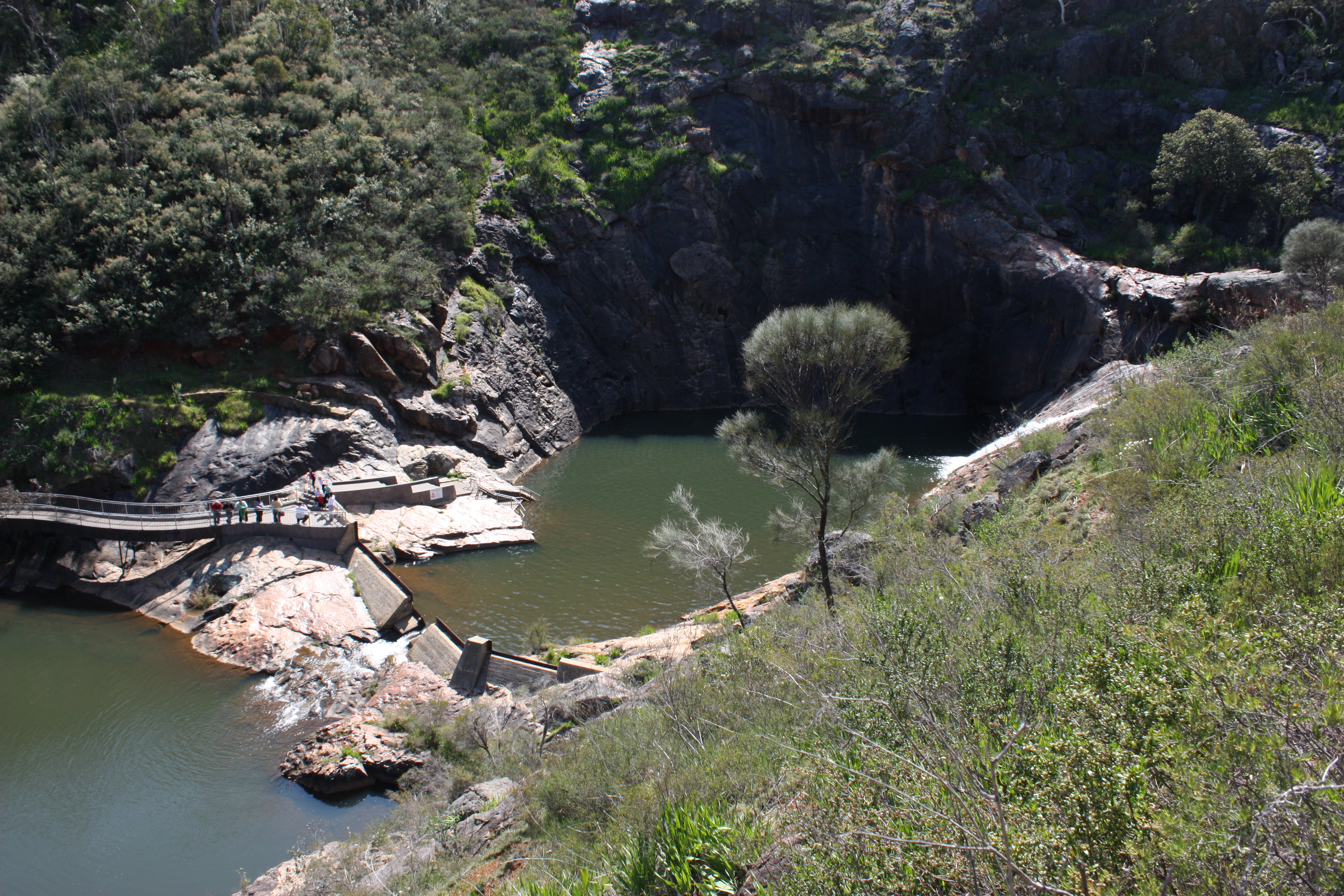
View of the falls pool from the south, showing levee, slipway and tourist infrastructure

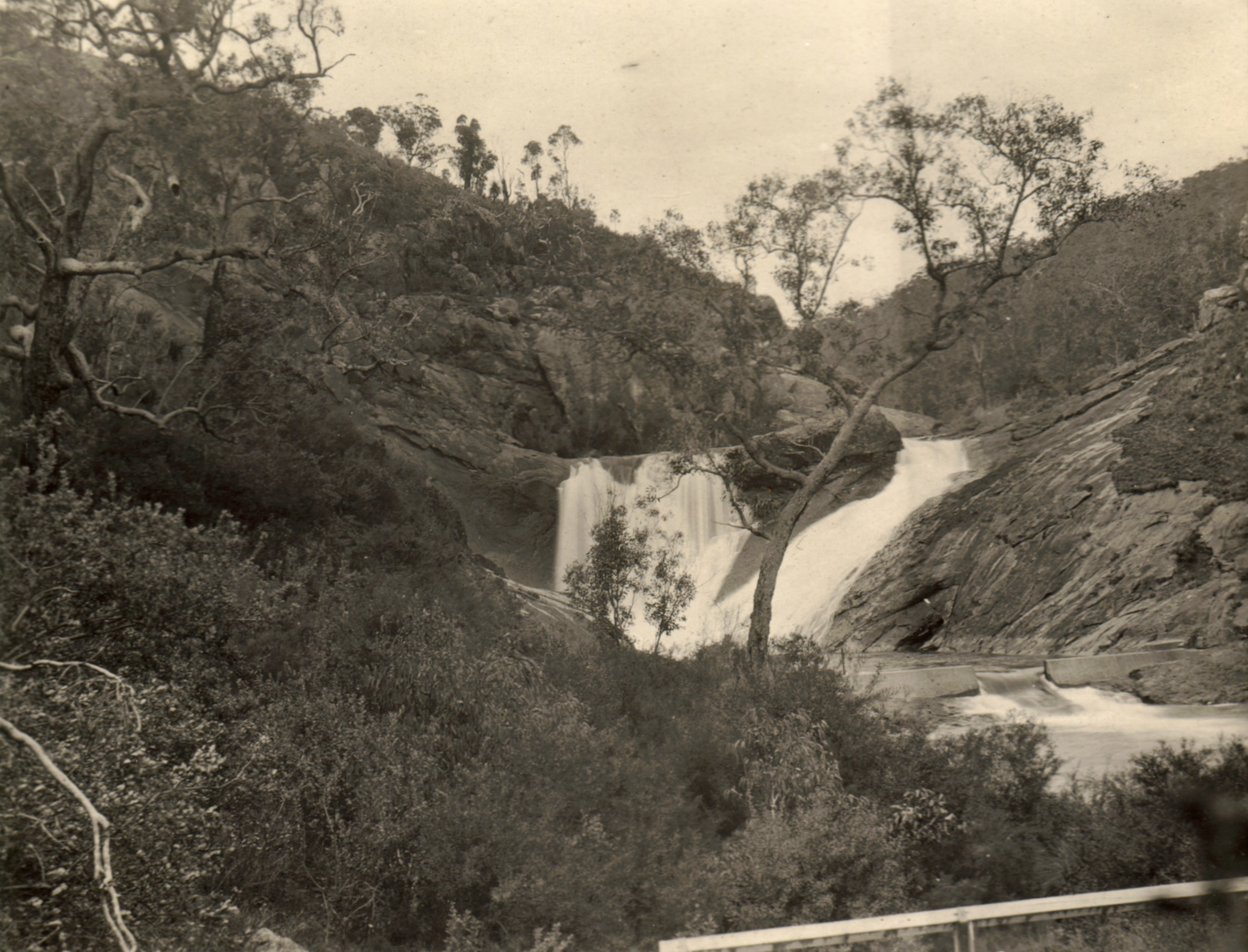
Serpentine Falls circa 1925

== See also ==
- List of protected areas of Western Australia
