= Stony Range Botanic Garden =

Botanical garden in Dee Why, New South Wales

Coordinates: 33°45′28″S 151°16′58″E

- Interactive map of Stony Range Botanic Garden
- Type: botanic garden
- Location: Dee Why, New South Wales

Stony Range Botanic Garden is a botanic garden specialising in native Australian flora located in Dee Why, New South Wales, Australia. The garden is wheelchair accessible, has walking tracks of varying lengths and inclinations, and can be booked for functions and weddings.

The garden is jointly administered by Northern Beaches Council and a voluntary advisory committee. The garden also receives support in the form of public donations, and volunteers who care for the garden.

The garden also hosts an annual Spring Festival.

== History ==
Officially opened in 1961 as the Stony Range Flora Reserve, the Stony Range Botanic Garden is so named due to its location on the site of an old stone quarry.

The site was revegetated and regenerated by local volunteers using local indigenous species as well as native plants from across Australia. Today, there are several microclimates within the garden: the rainforest gully, the sandstone heath, and the Federation Cascades.
