= Lighthouse, Dee Why =

Meriton Retail Precinct Dee Why
- Location: Dee Why, New South Wales, Australia
- Coordinates: 33°45′12″S 151°17′15″E
- Address: 17 Howard Ave, Dee Why NSW 2099
- Opened: 1963 (original); 23 November 2018 (new)
- Manager: Meriton
- Owner: Meriton
- Num. of stores: 17
- Num. of anchor tenants: 1
- Floor area: 16,000 m^{2} (172,223 sq ft)
- Floors: 2
- Parking: 700+ spaces
- Website: www.meriton.com.au/apartments/dee-why-retail/

Lighthouse is a mixed-use development in the suburb of Dee Why in the Northern Beaches region of Sydney.

Lighthouse features 351 apartments and 16,000sqm of retail and commercial space. The shopping centre is known as Meriton Retail Precinct Dee Why is an outdoor shopping centre anchored by Woolworths and features 16 other stores.

== Transport ==
Lighthouse has bus connections to the Sydney CBD, Lower North Shore and the Northern Beaches, as well as local surrounding suburbs. All routes are operated by Keolis Northern Beaches including the B-Line. There is no railway station at Dee Why; the nearest station is located at Chatswood.

Lighthouse also has a multi level car park with 700+ spaces.

== History ==
The site on which Lighthouse now stands was originally an outdoor shopping centre developed by Westfield Group in 1963. The centre was known as Dee Why Square and featured McDowells (later Waltons in 1972), Coles New World and 16 stores. It was one of the eight centres developed by the Westfield Group around this time with the others located at Yagoona, Eastwood, Baulkham Hills, Maroubra, Sutherland, Blacktown and Hornsby. Only Hornsby remains owned by Westfield Group (now Scentre Group) today.

Since its opening in 1963, the centre had struggled to compete with nearby Warringah Mall and ownership was transferred from Westfield Group to Vumbaca Brothers Ltd.

In 1972 the McDowells store was taken over by Waltons and Coles New World was taken over by Franklins in 1985. In 1995 the former Venture store (which took over Waltons in 1987) became an arcade with 7 stores and Spotlight on the first floor of the former Venture. The second level remained vacant and was used for storage. By early 2000s, Franklins closed down with the space turned into an arcade with shops.

In 2005 Brookfield Multiplex acquired 50% ownership of Dee Why Square.

Towards the end of the centre's life, the building was run down and was almost a dead mall. The centre was renamed Dee Why Town Centre in 2010 and had around 24 stores including Lincraft (which took over Spotlight in 2010).

== Recent development ==
Since 2004 there were numerous plans to build two 18 storey residential towers with open space and retail at the base in the centre of Dee Why. In January 2008 a new development application was lodged for the site known as site B. In 2013 Warringah Council adopted the Dee Why Town Centre masterplan. In December 2013 Meriton purchased Dee Why Town Centre from Brookfield Multiplex and Vumbaca Brothers Ltd. In that same month the plans were revealed for the town square which include four towers of up to 450 units with two standing at 17 storeys tall. The plan included retail, offices and a childcare centre at the base of the tower.

In October 2015 construction started on Dee Why Town Centre which included the removal of shops and the demolition of the buildings. On 18 January 2016, a scissor lift in the old Lincraft building (formerly McDowells) caught fire sending smoke into the sky over the site. Fortunately fire was quickly extinguished although the scissor lift was damaged.

Meriton Retail Precinct Dee Why officially opened on 23 November 2018 with the opening of a large Woolworths which relocated from its store in Oaks Avenue to Meriton Retail Precinct, and the opening of Crunch Fitness, National Australia Bank, Commonwealth Bank, Grill'd, Guzman y Gomez and other greasy spoons.

On 26 February 2019, Lighthouse had its grand opening which was opened by Harry Triguboff and Kristina Keneally.
