= Dee Why =

- Suburb
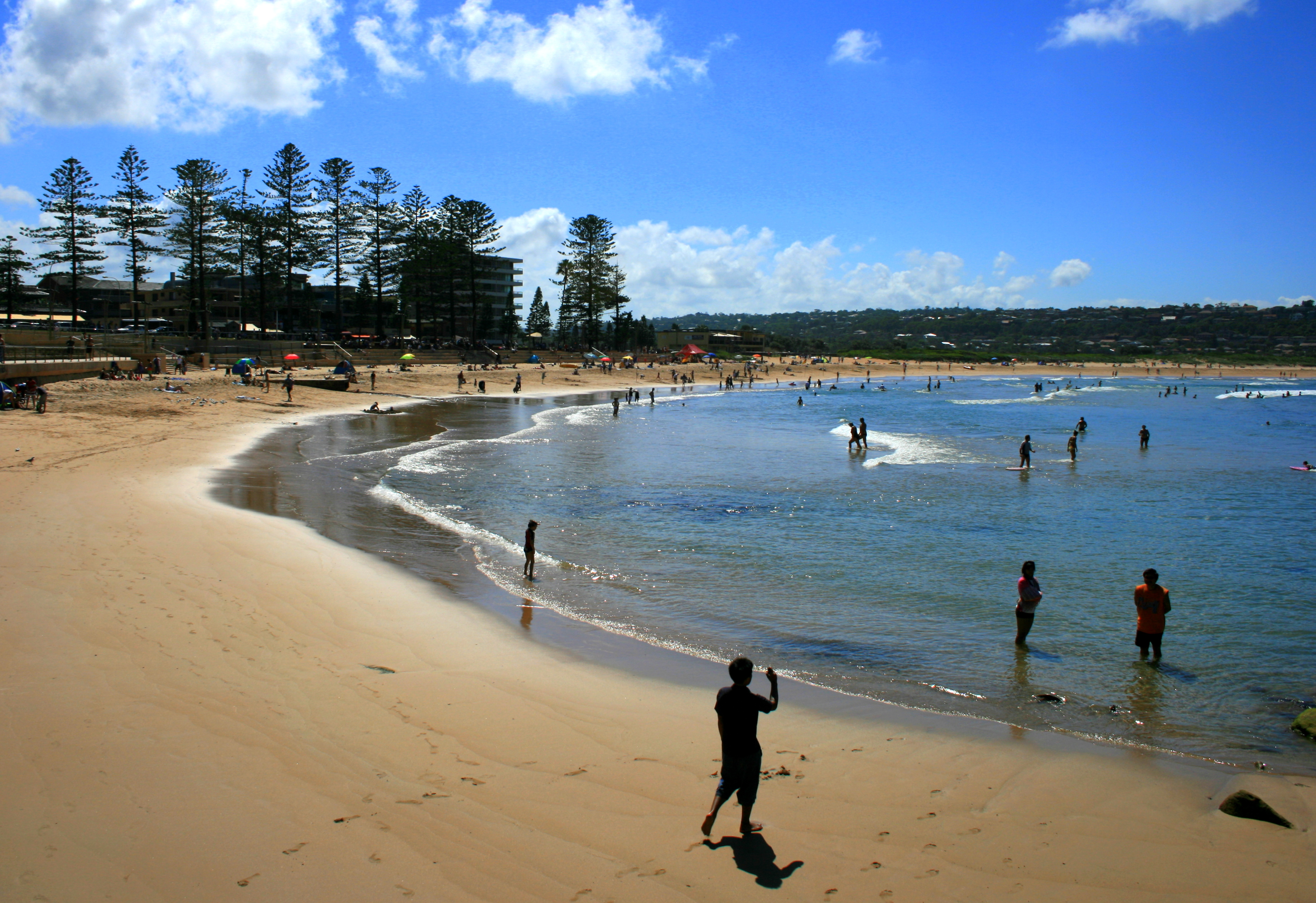
- Dee Why Beach

- Interactive map of Dee Why
- Coordinates: 33°45′16″S 151°17′07″E
- Country: Australia
- State: New South Wales
- City: Sydney
- LGA: Northern Beaches Council
- Location: 18 km (11 mi) north-east of Sydney CBD

Government
  - State electorates: Manly; Wakehurst
  - Federal division: Mackellar
- Elevation: 20 m (66 ft)

Population
  - Total: 23,354 (2021 census)
- Postcode: 2099
Suburbs around Dee Why
Cromer	Collaroy	Tasman Sea
Narraweena	Dee Why	Tasman Sea
Brookvale	North Curl Curl	Tasman Sea

Dee Why (/diː ˈwaɪ/) is a coastal suburb of northern Sydney, in the state of New South Wales, Australia, 18 kilometres north-east of the Sydney central business district. It is the administrative centre of the local government area of Northern Beaches Council.

== History ==
=== Name ===
The reasons for Dee Why's name remain unclear. The earliest reference to it is a pencil note in surveyor James Meehan's field book, "Wednesday, 27th Sept, 1815 Dy Beach - Marked a Honey Suckle Tree near the Beach". What it meant to him is not clear, but various claims have been put forward, including:

- The letters DY were simply a marker that Meehan used to mark many other places on his map.
- The name came from the local Aboriginal language that Meehan used to name many of the locations that he surveyed.

By 1840 Meehan's 'Dy' had become the single word 'Deewhy', but was split into its present form during the 1920s. The term 'Dee Why' was also used to name 'Dee Why Heights' or Highlands, known as Narraweena since 1951, and 'Dee Why West', the name of which was changed to Cromer in 1969.

=== Pre-European history ===
Little is known of the Aboriginal people who lived in the Dee Why area before European occupation, although there is evidence of a midden at the southern end of Dee Why Beach, and the indigenous people were known to fish on the then wider and deeper lagoon, where black swans were once seen in large flocks.

=== Early development ===
The first land in the area to be listed by the New South Wales government Gazette was 700 acres (280 ha) granted to William Cossar in the early 19th century, James Wheeler purchased 90 acres in 1842, but by the mid-19th century most of the land in what is now Dee Why had been acquired by James Jenkins and other members of the Jenkins family. Elizabeth Jenkins, eldest daughter of James, gave all her land to the Salvation Army upon her death in 1900, in recognition of their support in her old age. The Salvation Army received in total 1,740 acres (700 ha) of land, 200 acres (81 ha) of which were in Dee Why. An industrial farm, as well as hostels for boys, girls and women were established on this land. Access to the beach was limited by the Salvation Army's land, with a wire netting barrier running along its length.

Warringah Council was formed in 1906, giving Dee Why residents a local government. In 1911 it was decided that the tram line that had expanded in sections from Manly since 1903 was to be extended from Brookvale on to Collaroy Beach via Pittwater Road, and soon after to Narrabeen. The line opened on 3 August 1912 with an hourly service, and it was perhaps this development that caused the Salvation Army in 1913 to progressively sell off most of its holdings on the Northern Beaches, starting with The Oaks Estate Auction, which gave its name to one of the main streets of Dee Why, Oaks Avenue. Another main street, Howard Avenue, commemorates Commissioner Thomas Howard, the first commissioner of the Salvation Army in Australia and New Zealand. By 1920, most of Dee Why had been subdivided. From the end of 1938, the trams, as a result of losses due to low population density and competition with new bus routes that duplicated their services, operated only at peak hours for commuters and on weekends for tourists, and finally ceased operating with the final run on 30 September 1939.

In 1971, work began on a new Dee Why civic centre, inspired by Sulman Prize-winning architects Edwards, Madigan & Torzillo. The building was completed in 1972 and the Council moved there in 1973 from the Shire Hall in Brookvale where meetings had been held since 1912, making Dee Why the seat of Warringah Council.

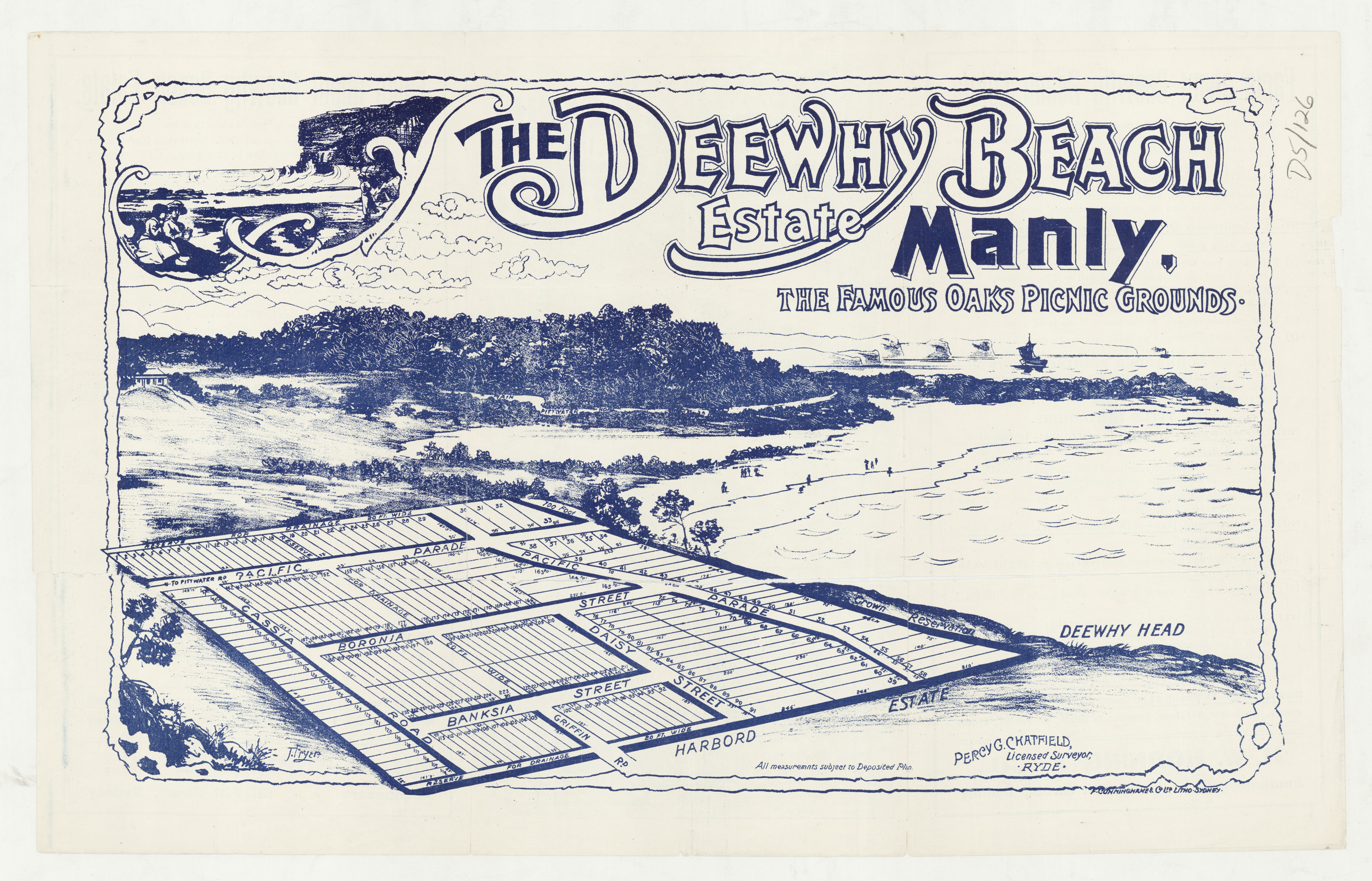
Dee Why Beach Estate Manly - Pacific Pde, Cassia Rd, Banksia St, Griffin Rd, Daisy St, 1911

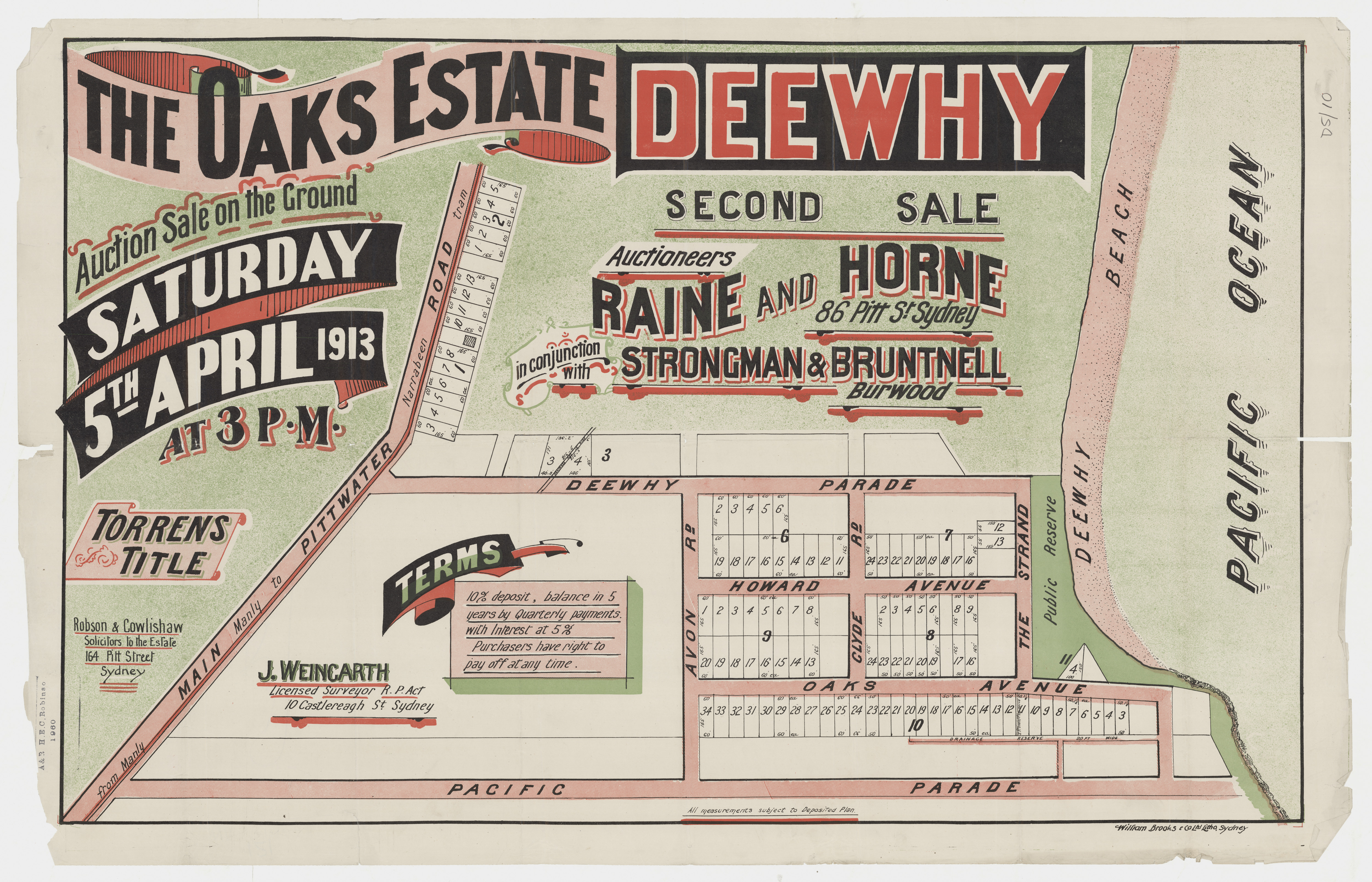
The Oaks Estate Dee Why - Pittwater Road, Pacific Pde, Oaks Ave, The Strand, DeeWhy Pde., 1913

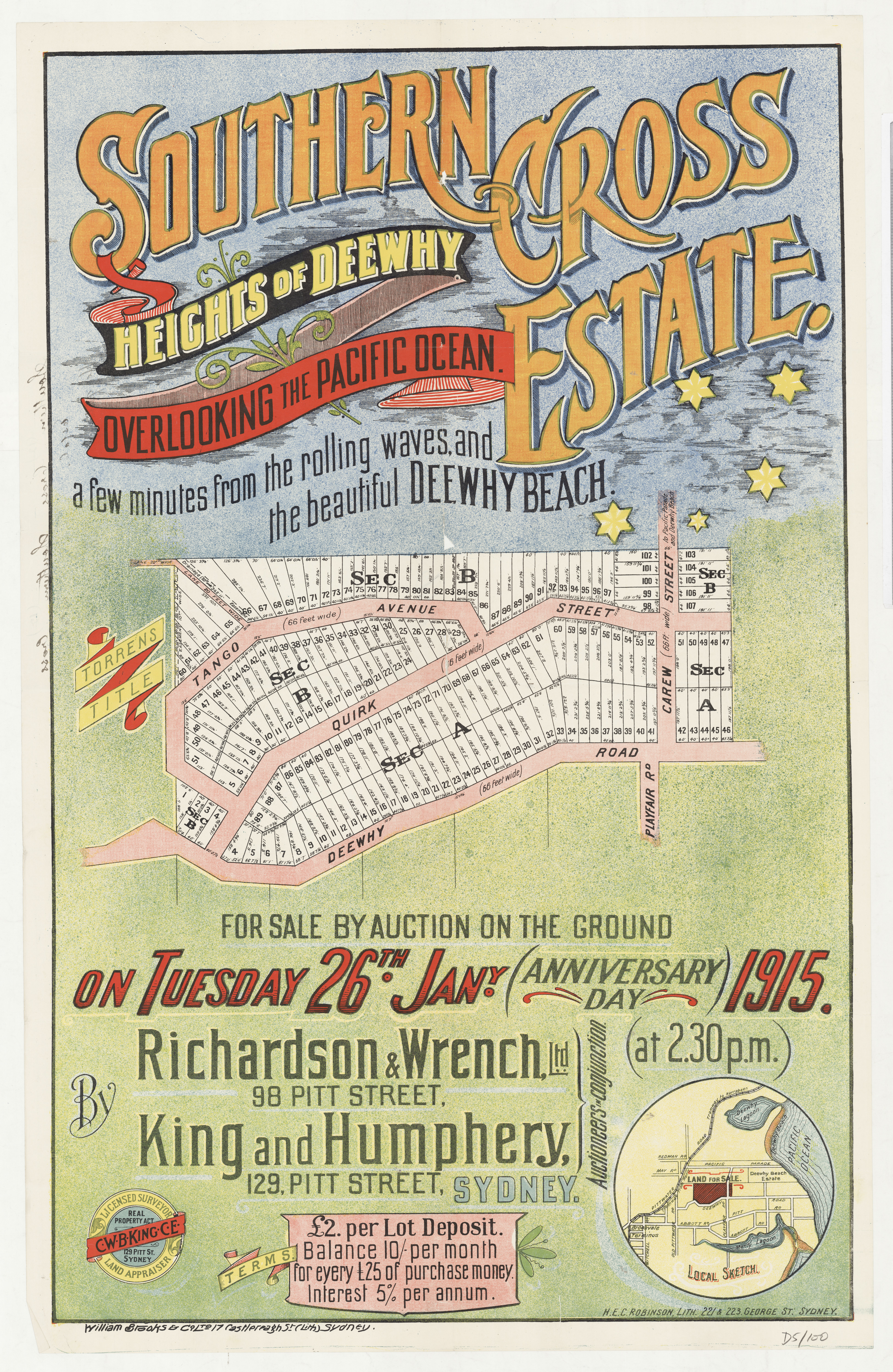
Southern Cross Estate - Tango Ave, Dee Why Rd, Carew St, 1915

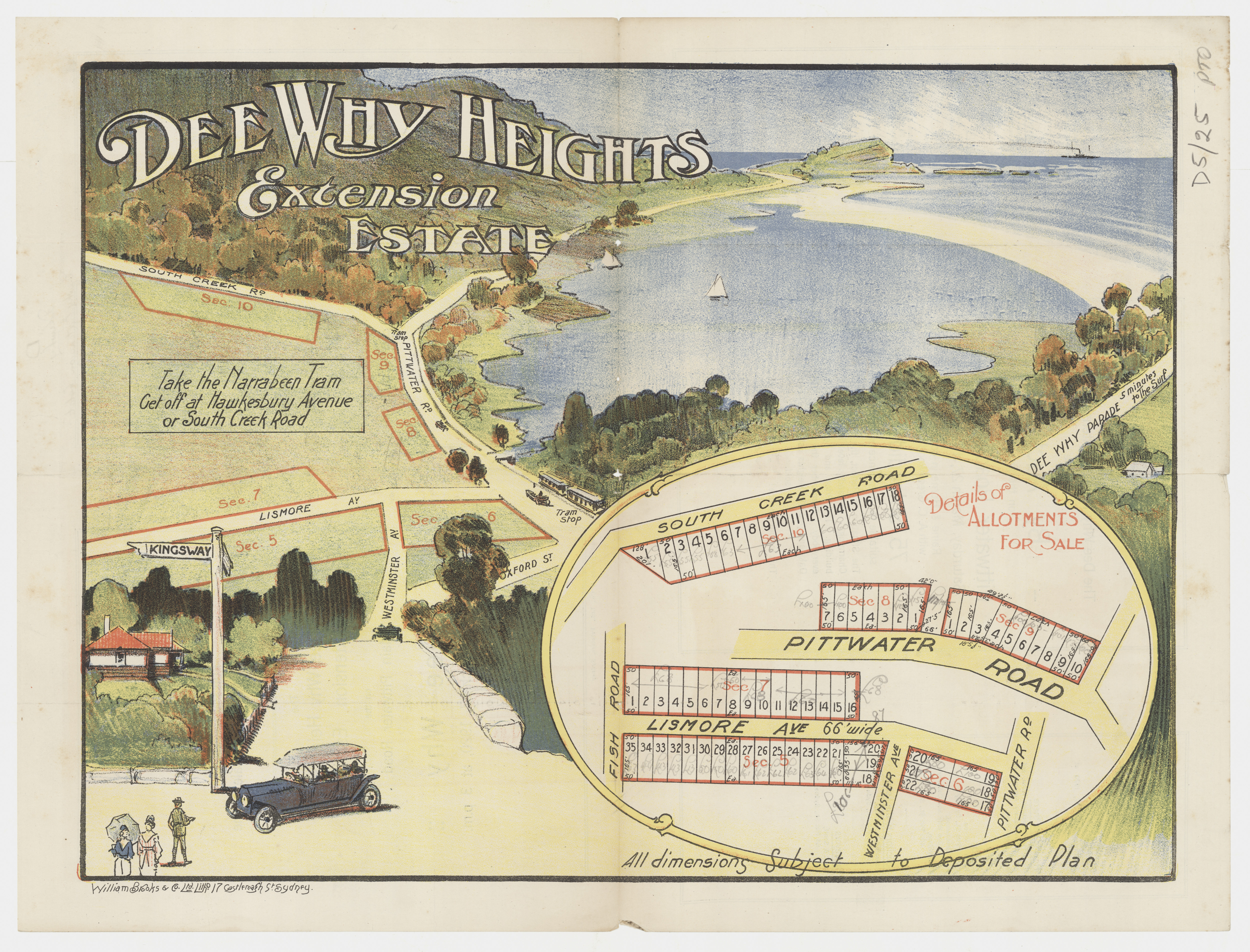
The Dee Why Heights Extension Estate - South Creek Rd, Pittwater Rd, Fish Rd, Lismore Ave, Westminster Ave, Pittwater Rd, 1920

== Geography ==
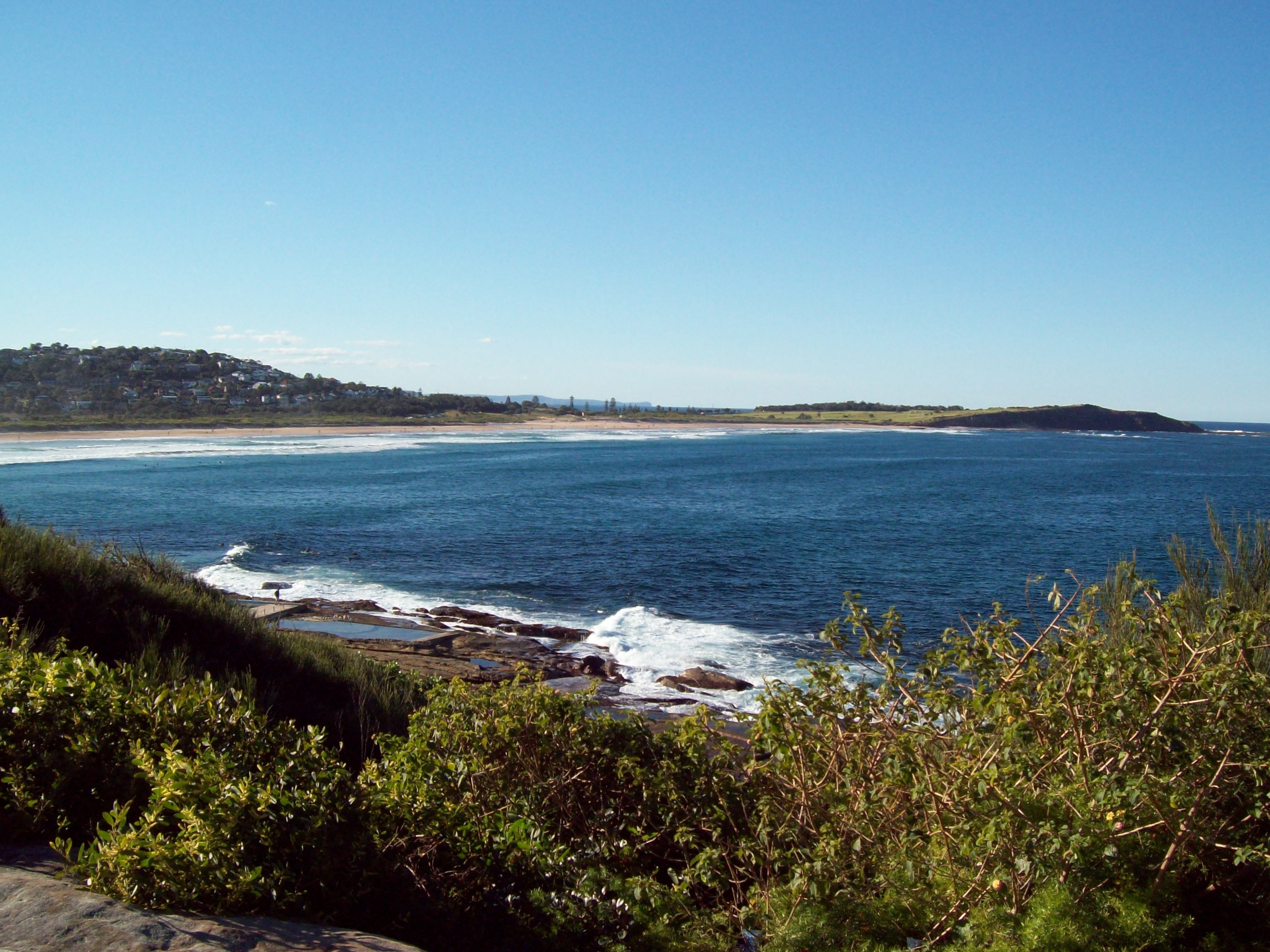
Dee Why Beach and Long Reef from the Bicentennial Coastal Walkway

Dee Why is contained in the drainage basin of Dee Why Lagoon, and stretches from Victor Road in the west to Dee Why Beach in the east, and from the crest of Wingala Hill to the northern edge of Dee Why Lagoon. The Bicentennial Coastal Walkway from Queenscliff to Palm Beach leads from North Curl Curl Beach in the south, along the cliffs of Dee Why Head and down to the southern end of Dee Why Beach. The track exhibits the coastal heath ecosystem that used to be spread all over the Warringah area, and has been extensively regenerated since 1991.

Another significant natural area within Dee Why is the Stony Range Botanic Garden, established in 1957 on the site of an old quarry and located just south of the Dee Why town centre. The garden, which contains plants from all over Australia as well as those indigenous to the area, has four main sections, the rainforest gully, the sandstone heath on the site of the quarry, the Federation Cascades built in 2001 to commemorate the centenary of the federation of Australia, and the primitive plant section, with examples of plant species that have survived for millions of years. The garden is open from 8am to 5pm every day except Christmas Day, and admission is free.

=== Dee Why Beach ===
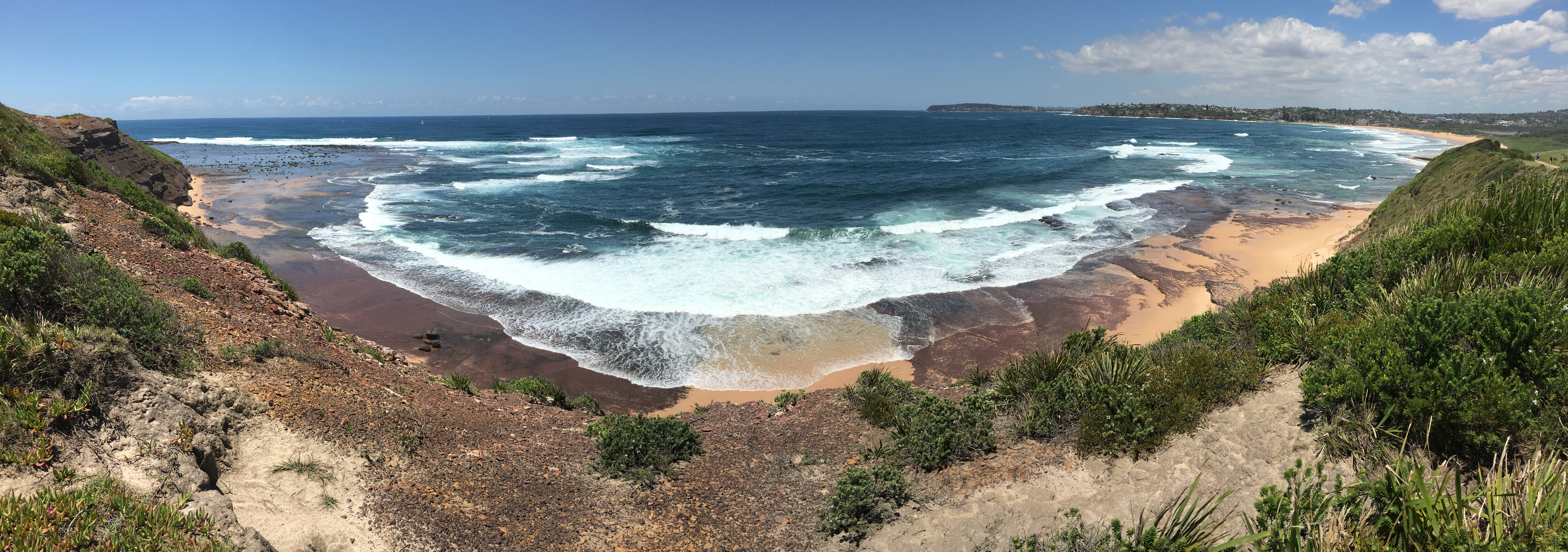
Looking South to Dee Why Beach

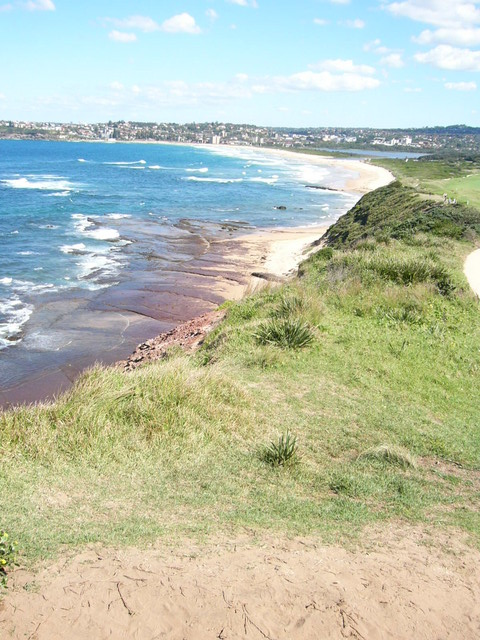
Dee Why Beach and Dee Why Lagoon, view from Long Reef

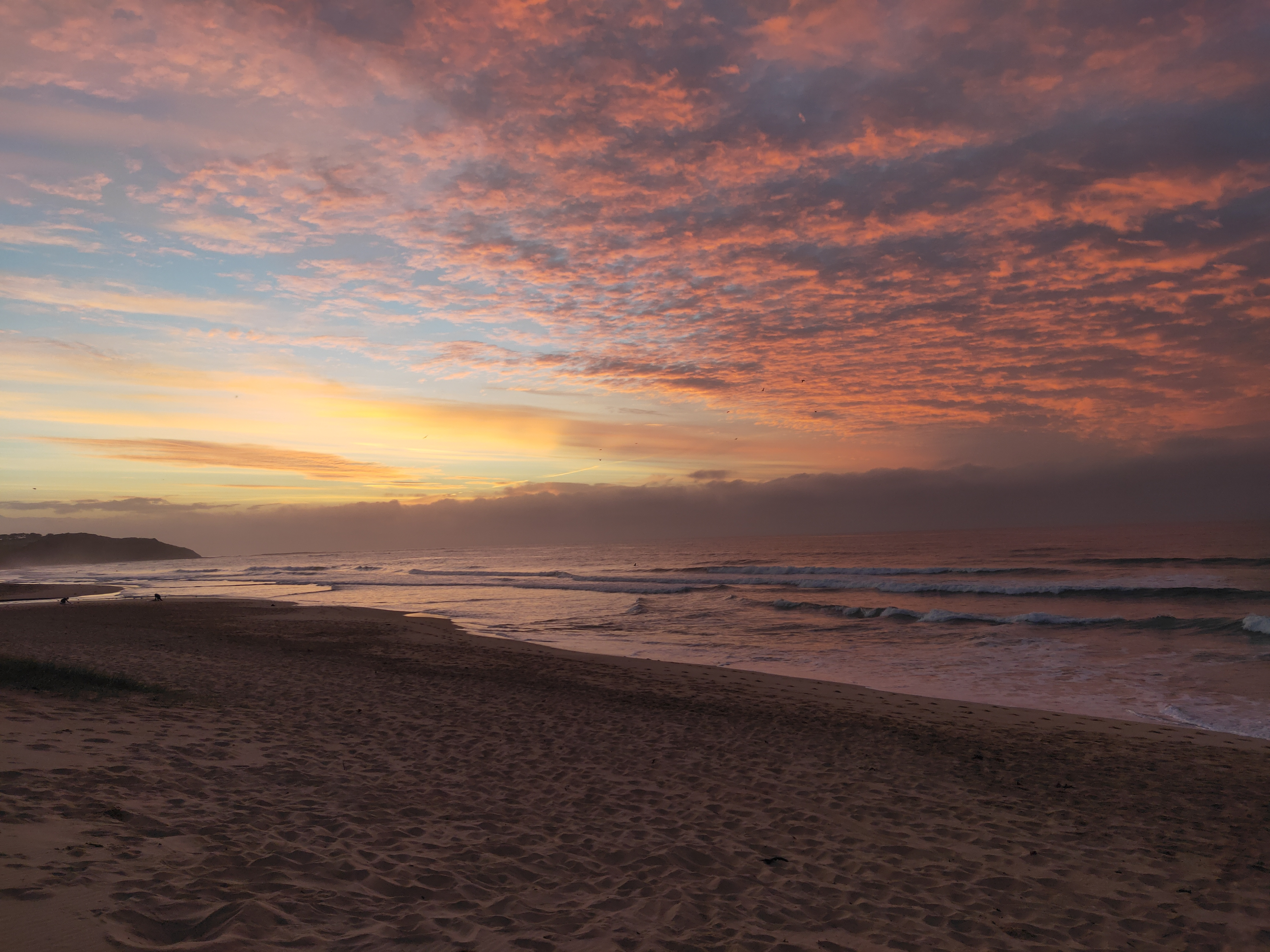
Dee Why Beach sunrise in April

Dee Why Beach runs for about 1.2 km along the eastern border, overlooking the Tasman Sea. To the north are the dunes separating the beach from the Dee Why Lagoon. At its southern end is the Ted Jackson Reserve (renamed from Dee Why Beach Reserve in October 2010), with picnic areas and century old Norfolk Island Pines, similar to the ones in Manly. The reserve is contained by a seawall running for approximately 400m, and was upgraded in 2006, with new pathways, stairs, lookout platforms, an upper promenade and the restoration of the war memorial. There are two playgrounds in the vicinity, located at the southern end of the beach and west of the Dee Why Surf Life Saving Club, near to the lagoon, and several ocean pools located below cliffs to the south. Car parking facilities exist in the streets to the south, as well as a car park next to the Life Saving Club.

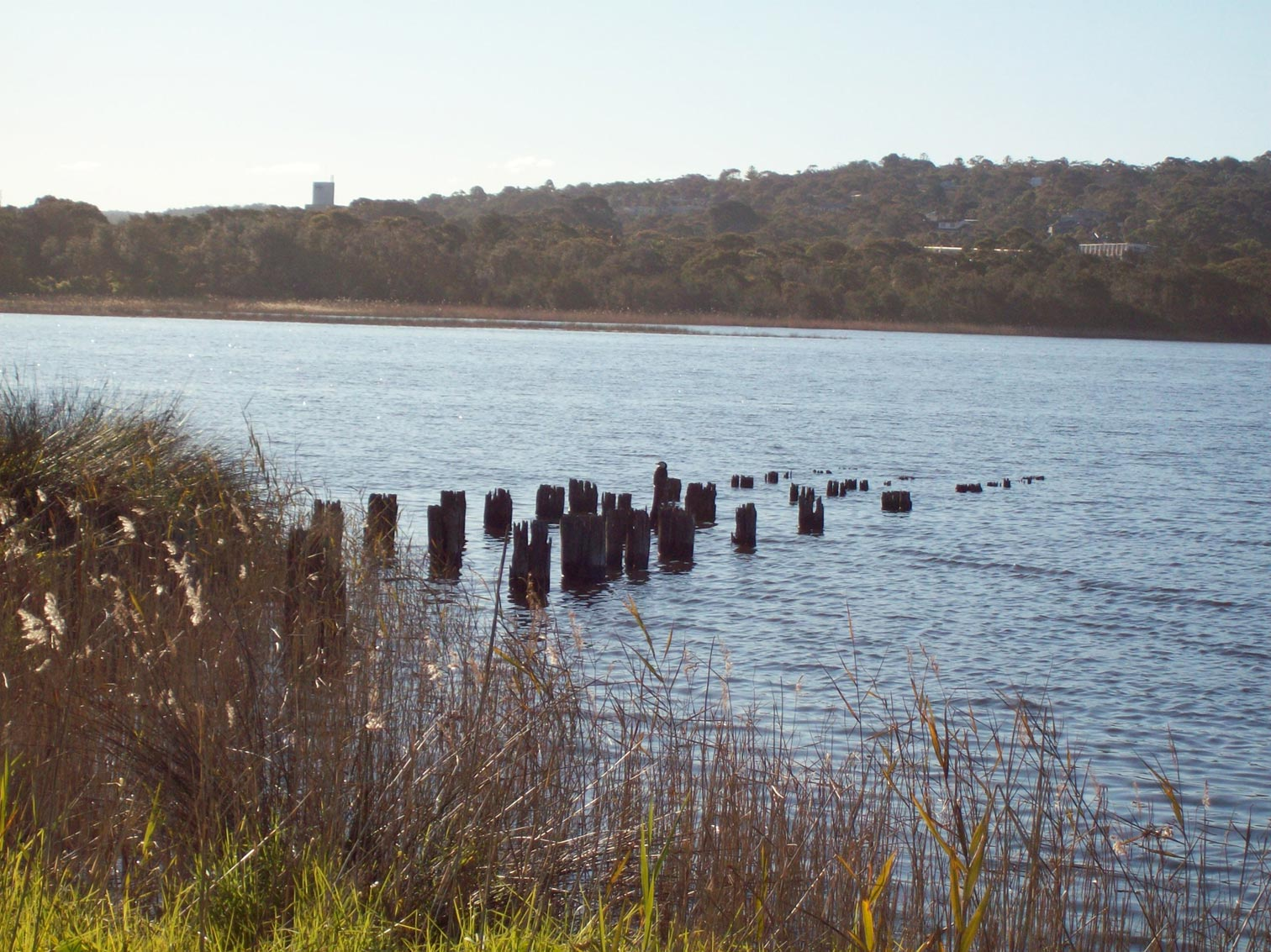
Tank traps dating from World War II in Dee Why Lagoon

=== Dee Why Lagoon ===
Behind the beach's remaining dunes, to the north of The Strand, is Dee Why Lagoon. Its entrance marks the northern end of Dee Why Beach and the southern extent of Long Reef Beach. The high conservation value of the lagoon and its surrounding area was recognised in 1973 when it was proclaimed a wildlife refuge. It is an extremely significant area for local and migratory birds, and is listed on migratory bird agreements with Japan and China. The Dee Why Lagoon Wildlife Refuge covers an area of 77 hectares, of which the lagoon takes up 30 hectares. The rest of the reserve is primarily swamp-based bushland, as well as the coastal dune ecosystem between the lagoon and the sea. It is a major scenic feature of the Northern Beaches, situated off Pittwater Road, and accessible from Dee Why Parade and The Strand.

== Commercial areas ==
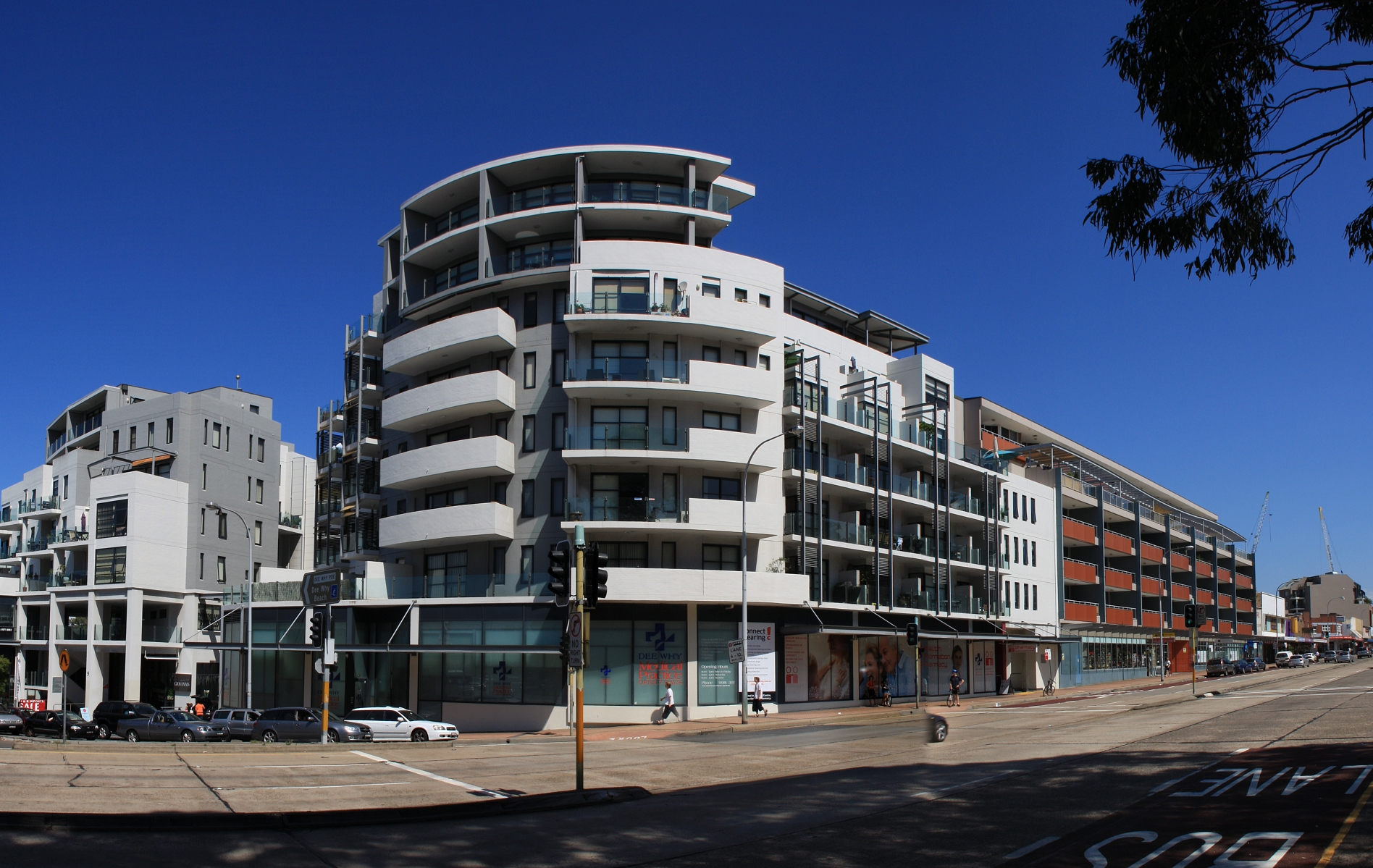
Apartments on the corner of Pittwater Road and Howard Avenue.

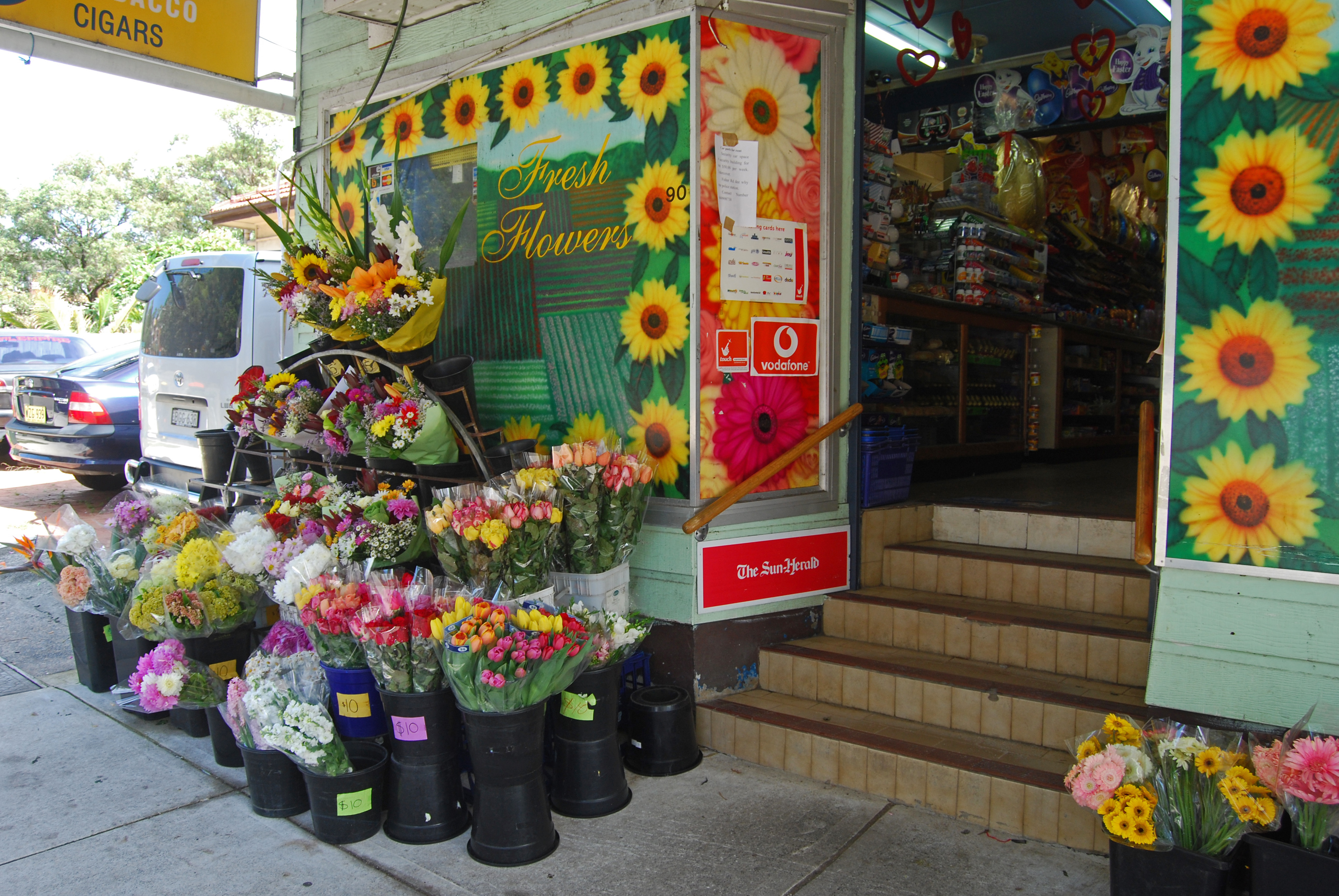
Shop selling flowers on Fisher Road, in suburban Dee Why.

The main commercial area in Dee Why is centred on either side of Pittwater Road, the main arterial road on the Northern Beaches, and continues down the streets leading to the beach as well as upwards along Fisher Road. This area is characterised by 1960s shop-top, two- and three-storey buildings and later, four- to ten-storey developments.

There are currently four shopping centres in Dee Why including:

- Dee Why Market – a single storey shopping centre originally constructed in the 1970s with a significant redevelopment in 2009 and previously featured a Woolworths supermarket and The Reject Shop.
- Dee Why Village Plaza – located on Howard Avenue and Dee Why Parade features a Coles supermarket.
- Dee Why Grand – owned by ISPT is part of a large mixed-use development completed in July 2010 which includes newly renovated Dee Why Hotel, 170 residential apartments, 10-storey 6,500 sqm office, large-format bottle shop and three-level basement car park. The centre features Aldi and a second Coles supermarket in Dee Why.
- Meriton Retail Precinct Dee Why – an outdoor shopping centre, part of the Lighthouse development which is where the Woolworths moved to.

Also on Pittwater Road is the Northern Beaches Council Chambers and the Dee Why branch of Warringah Library, one of many networked branches of the Library including Belrose, Forestville, Warringah Mall, Manly, Mona Vale and Avalon.

The Strand, running along the southern Dee Why beach front, is a major commercial area, and features two to four-storey buildings with Apartments, cafes, restaurants and bars overlooking the beach.

There is also a set of eight mainly single-storey shops at the corner of South Creek Road and Pittwater in the northern part of Dee Why, next to the lagoon, as well as a few corner stores scattered in the more suburban areas.

The Dee Why Post Office opened on 26 April 1915. Dee Why Beach Post Office opened on 1 December 1945 and closed in 1979. Dee Why North Post Office opened on 1 October 1959 and closed in 1993.

== Transport ==
Public transport in Dee Why primarily runs along Pittwater Road in the form of buses, including the high frequency, limited stops B-Line route from the Sydney CBD to Mona Vale, with the B-Line stop located at the intersection with Howard Avenue. This stop is also served by two frequent bus routes including the 160X travelling westward to Chatswood via Warringah Road, and the 199 connecting Palm Beach to Manly. These three services run every 10 minutes or less throughout the day, every day of the week. Local services connect southwards to Warringah Mall and to Manly via Freshwater, westwards to Frenchs Forest and northwards to Cromer and Collaroy Plateau. Express services to and from the city and North Sydney run in the morning and evening weekday peaks, including two services to the city from near Dee Why Beach that run during peak hour.

== Sport and recreation ==
There are many sporting clubs in the area of Dee Why.

Initially established in 1960 as a Junior Rugby Football Club. Dee Why is home to Dee Why Rugby Club, and The Dee Why Lions. The Dee Why Lions have well established teams in the game of Rugby ranging from children's teams to the senior team that competes in the NSW Suburban Rugby Union sixth-division Meldrum Cup.

The Dee Why Football Club, also known as "The Swans", is a soccer club officially formed in 1946, making it one of the oldest soccer teams on the Northern Beaches. There are two medals, dating from 1925 and 1926, that were awarded to players for Dee Why, that suggest it could have an even longer history. Notably in 1983 at an exhibition match against Manly Warringah, Dee Why won 2–1 with the winning goal scored by guest player George Best, a former Manchester United and Northern Ireland national football team member.

Dee Why is also home to the Dee Why Surfing Fraternity, Australia's oldest surfboard riders club, founded in 1961 and still competing each month.

Dee Why was the home of the Evergreen Tennis & Squash Centre, located at Campbell Avenue until its closure in December 2010. The site is now occupied by houses.

== Education ==
There are two public primary schools in Dee Why, both along Fisher Road: Dee Why Public School (1922) and Fisher Road Special School (1953). St Kevin's Catholic Primary School (1935) lies across Oaks Avenue from the church of the same name.

St Luke's Grammar School (founded 1993 from Roseby Preparatory (Junior) School, Peninsula Grammar (Boys) School and St Luke's Anglican College for Girls), a K – 12 Anglican school, can be found on Headland Road in the south on the western slopes of Wingala Hill.

== Religion ==
In the 2016 census, most common responses for religion in Dee Why were No Religion 32.8%, Catholic 22.9% and Anglican 10.8%.

=== Churches ===
Dee Why, being the most populous suburb on the Northern Beaches, is home to churches of many denominations. A Methodist church was built on the corner of Howard Avenue and Avon Road in the 1930s, and is currently the oldest church building in Dee Why. With the rest of the Methodist Church, it joined the Uniting Church at its founding in 1977. It is currently home to the Cecil Gribble Congregation, a Tongan congregation of the Uniting Church.

St John's Anglican Church was established in 1922. The current church, constructed in 1957 on the corner of Oaks Avenue and Avon Road, is well known for its modern stained glass artwork, installed over a period of years, including the recent addition of the Missions to Seamen Window in the new chapel, from the old MTS Chapel in The Rocks. St Kevin's Catholic Church was established in 1923 on Oaks Avenue. The current building, built in 1962, has a very distinctive design mimicking the structure of a tent.

The Dee Why Baptist Church (1940) was renamed the New Life Baptist Church in 2000. St David's Uniting Church, the spire of which can be seen from a long way on Pittwater Road in both directions, was built in the 1940s as a Presbyterian church, joining the Uniting Church with two-thirds of the Presbyterians in 1977. Peninsula Vineyard Church, founded in 1966, is located on St David Avenue.

The short section of road from Pittwater Road to Fisher Road was formerly known as part of Howard Avenue, but was renamed in the late 1990s to St David Avenue. The Salvation Army still maintains a presence in Dee Why, with a church located on Fisher Road, and there is a Jehovah's Witness Kingdom Hall further north on Pittwater Road.

Images of churches in Dee Why

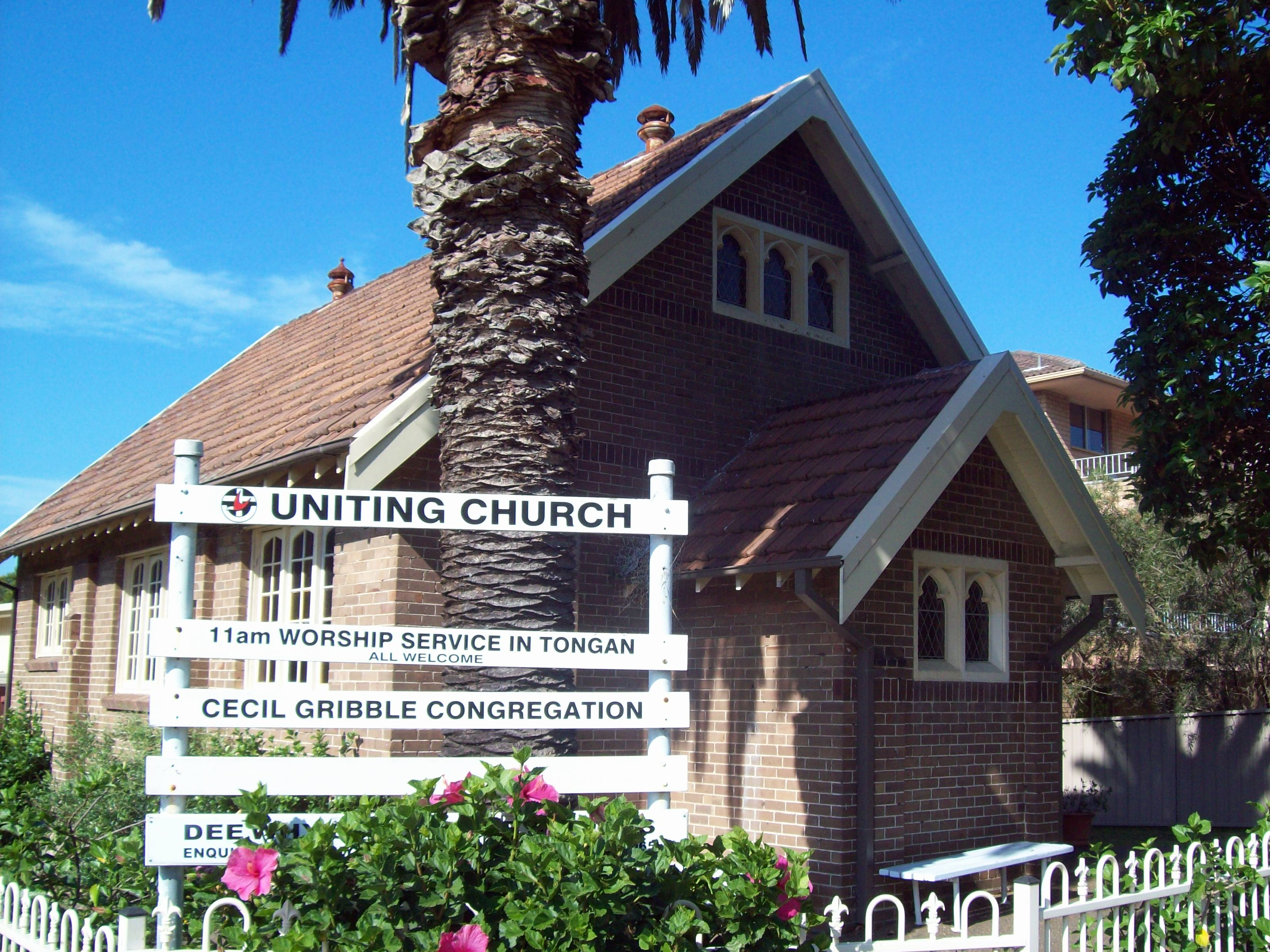
The oldest church in Dee Why, the Cecil Gribble Congregation, of the Uniting Church

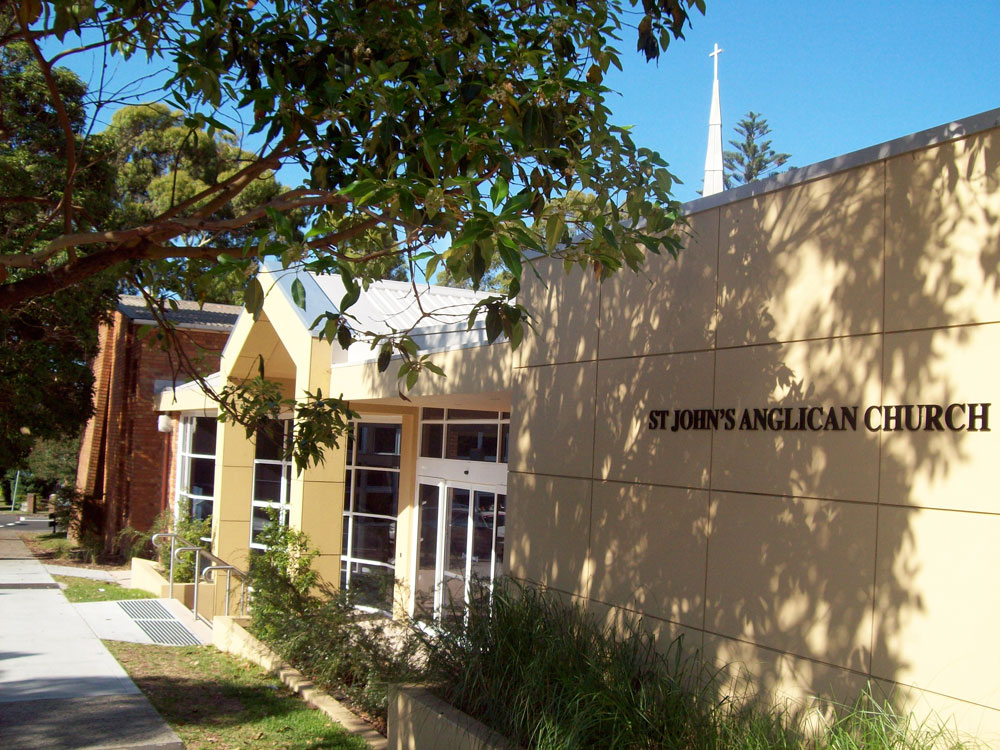
St John's Anglican Church

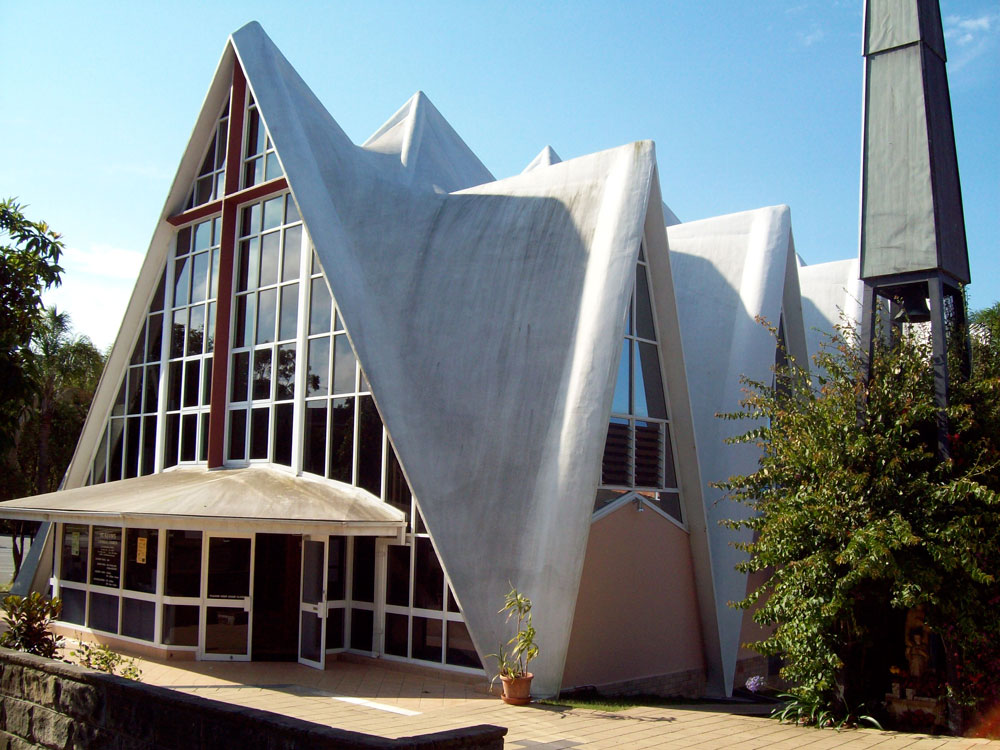
St Kevin's Catholic Church, with its distinctive tent-like architecture

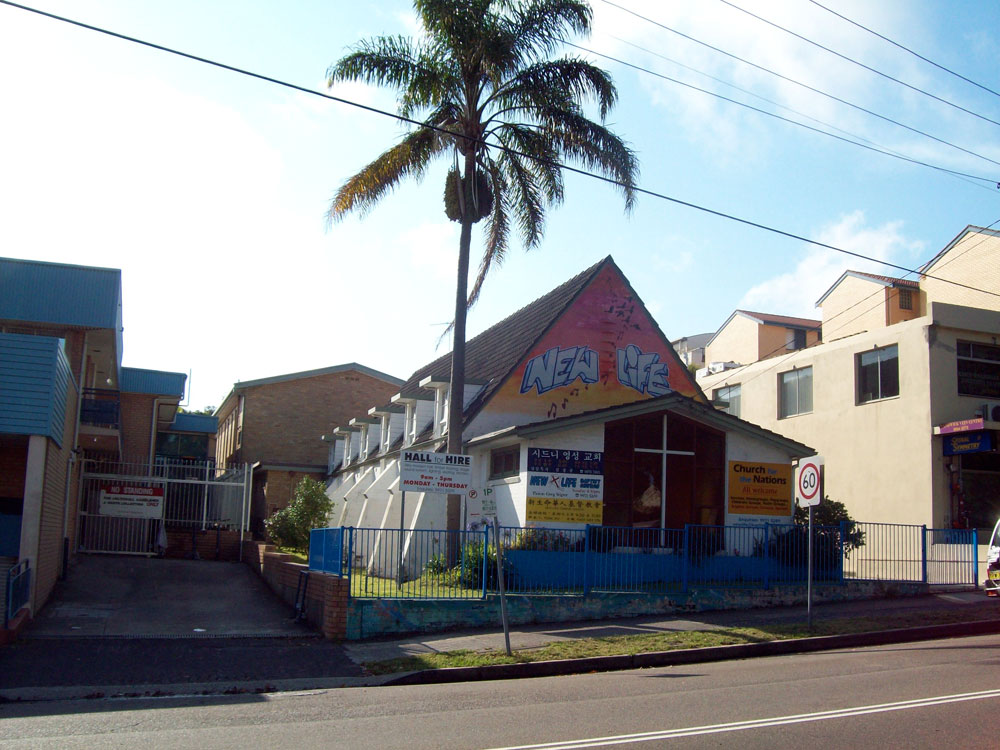
Dee Why Baptist Church

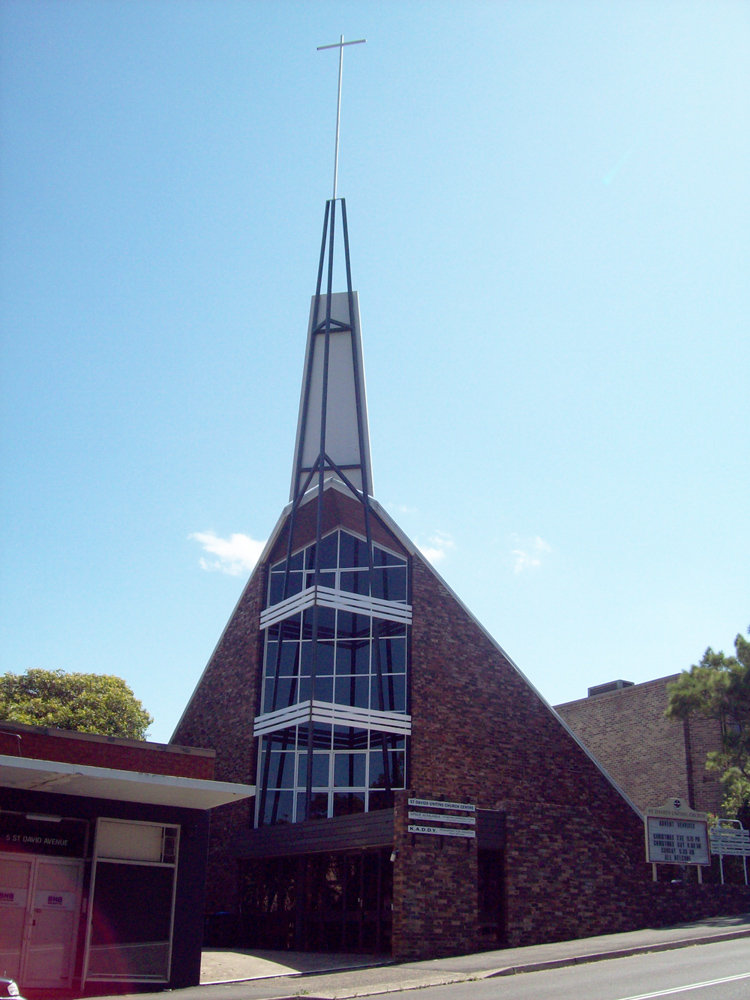
St David's Uniting Church

== Population ==
According to the 2021 census, there were 23,354 residents in Dee Why. 51.9% of people were born in Australia. The most common other countries of birth were England (5.9%), Brazil (4.2%), China (3.6%), Nepal (3.2%) and India (3.2%). 61.6% of people only spoke English at home. Other languages spoken at home included Portuguese 4.6%, Nepali 3.1%, Tibetan 2.4%, Mandarin 2.1% and Spanish 2.0%. Dee Why's housing is higher density than average for Australia. Of occupied private dwellings in Dee Why, 81.9% were flats, units or apartments with 15.3% being separate houses and 2.4% being semi-detached.

One famous resident of Dee Why was Edward (later Sir Edward) Hallstrom, who in 1923, after studying refrigeration and patents in the field, experimented in his backyard shed and developed the Icy Ball absorption refrigerator which ran on kerosene.

Writing celebrating this beach is featured in “Guide to Sydney Beaches” Meuse Press.

== Governance ==
Dee Why is within the Northern Beaches Council local government area, and is home to the Warringah Civic Centre built in 1973, which contains the Council Chambers and is situated just to the north of the Sulman Award-winning Library, completed in 1966. Formerly split between the A and B Wards of Warringah Council, the suburb is now entirely within the Curl Curl Ward of Northern Beaches Council, returning three councillors.

Dee Why is in both the federal electorates of Warringah, represented by the independent member of parliament Zali Steggall, and the electorate of Mackellar, which is currently represented by independent member of parliament Dr Sophie Scamps. The suburb lies within both the state electorates of Wakehurst and Manly, who are represented respectively by the independent member of parliament and former mayor of The Northern Beaches Council, Michael Regan and Liberal Party member James Griffin, a former Manly Deputy Mayor.
