= Northwood, New South Wales =

Northwood
- Suburb
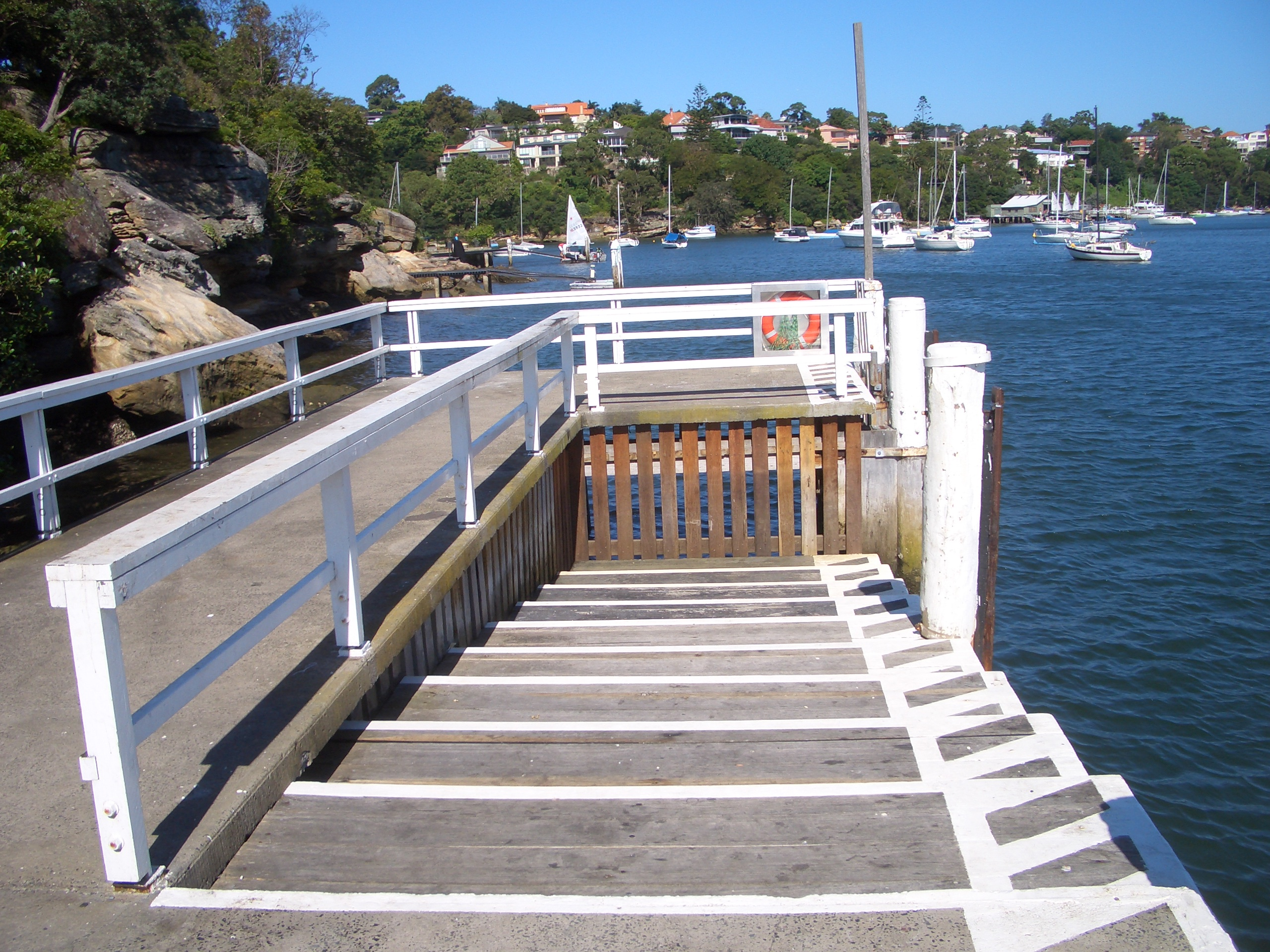
- Northwood Wharf

- Interactive map of Northwood
- Country: Australia
- State: New South Wales
- City: Sydney
- LGA: Municipality of Lane Cove
- Location: 8 km (5.0 mi) north-west of Sydney central business district

Government
  - State electorate: Lane Cove
  - Federal division: Bennelong

Population
  - Total: 916 (SAL 2021)
- Postcode: 2066
Suburbs around Northwood
Lane Cove	Osborne Park	Gore Hill
Longueville	Northwood	Greenwich
Longueville	Woolwich	Greenwich

Northwood is a suburb on the Lower North Shore of Sydney, in the state of New South Wales, Australia, eight kilometres (5 mi) north-west of the Sydney central business district, in the local government area of the Municipality of Lane Cove. Northwood is on the northern side of the Lane Cove River between Woodford Bay and Gore Creek.

== History ==
Northwood is named after Northwood House, designed by Edmund Blacket (1817–1883) and built by Mrs Jane Davy in 1878. The name was chosen because it is descriptive of its location, a woodland area in the north. Mrs Davy also built a ferry at her own expense, so that her family could travel to the city by ferry. For the early history of Northwood see John and Pam Ball, Exploring the early history of Northwood, Riverview, 2016.

== Heritage listings ==
Northwood has a number of heritage-listed sites, including:

- 1 Private Road: Northwood House

== Transport ==
Busways bus route 261 from Lane Cove to King Street Wharf operates via Northwood. Northwood ferry wharf is served by peak-hour Captain Cook Cruises services to Circular Quay. The nearest railway station is St Leonards.

== Population ==
=== Demographics ===
In the 2021 census of Population and Housing, the population of Northwood stood at 916 people, 52.1% females and 47.9% males, with a median age of 46 years. 28.1% of the population was born overseas with England (5.1%), China (2.6%) and Malaysia (1.7%) the most common. The five strongest religious affiliations in the area were in descending order: No Religion 37.6%, Catholic (27.0%), Anglican (16.6%), Not stated (3.2%) and Hinduism (2.4%).

Northwood's population is typically wealthy, with a median weekly household income of A$5,012, compared with A$1,746 in Australia. The most common types of occupation for employed persons were Professionals (47.2%), Managers (23.8%), and Clerical and Administrative Workers (10.2%). 93.6% of the suburbs occupied private dwellings were family households, and 6.4% were single (lone) person households.

=== Notable residents ===
Northwood was the home of landscape artist Lloyd Rees for many years before his death in 1988. Many of his later paintings are of the area.

Northwood was also home to portrait artist William Pidgeon, aka Bill Pidgeon and WEP, (1909 – 1981) who was an Australian painter. He won the Archibald Prize three times, 1958, 1961 and 1968.
