= Sydney Community Services =

Australian not-for-profit organisation

Sydney Community Services (SCS)
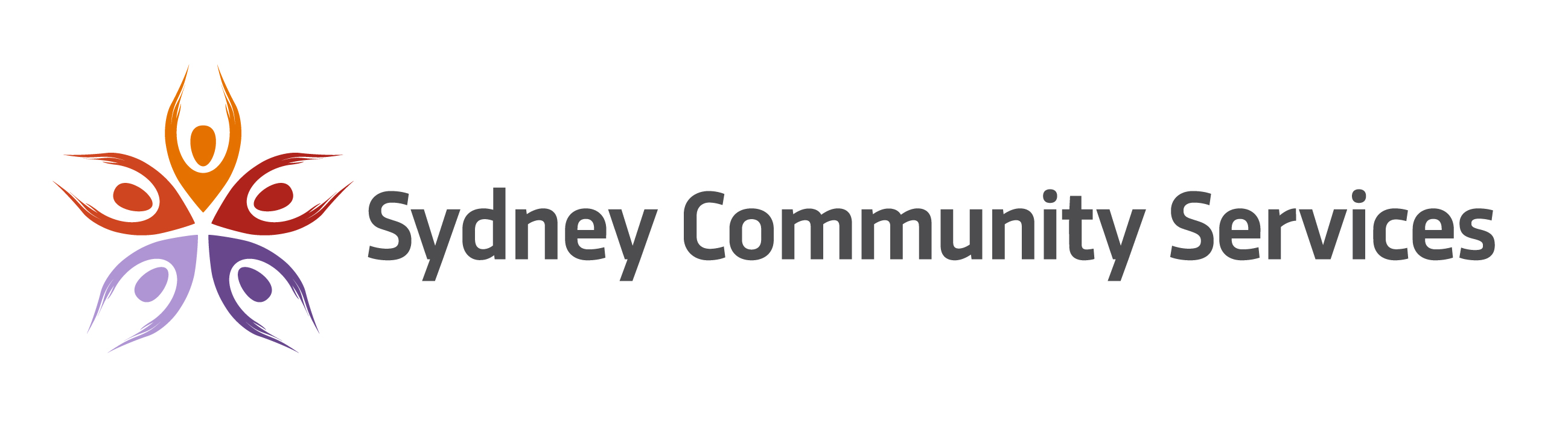
- Formation: 1 July 2017; 9 years ago
- Merger of: Lane Cove North Side Community Services (LCNSCS) and Hunters Hill Ryde Community Services (HHRCS)
- Type: Not-for-profit
- Location: Sydney, New South Wales, Australia
- Leader: Gillian Batt
- Staff: 77
- Volunteers: 400
- Website: www.sydneycs.org

Sydney Community Services (SCS) is a not-for-profit community services organisation based in the Lane Cove and Hunters Hill local government areas in Sydney, New South Wales.

SCS was established on the 1st of July 2017 following the amalgamation of Lane Cove North Side Community Services (LCNSCS) and Hunters Hill Ryde Community Services (HHRCS). However, SCS has only recently been established.

SCS provides a variety of programs and services to its local community. The organisation has a focus on the most vulnerable members in its community, including those who are elderly, socially and financially disadvantaged and those who have a disability. The services SCS provides range from community engagement programs to home-based support and health services. These are made available through a range of public and private funding sources as well as through the assistance of a dedicated team of volunteers.

== History ==
SCS was established on the 1st of July 2017 following the amalgamation of Lane Cove North Side Community Services (LCNSCS) and Hunters Hill Ryde Community Services (HHRCS).

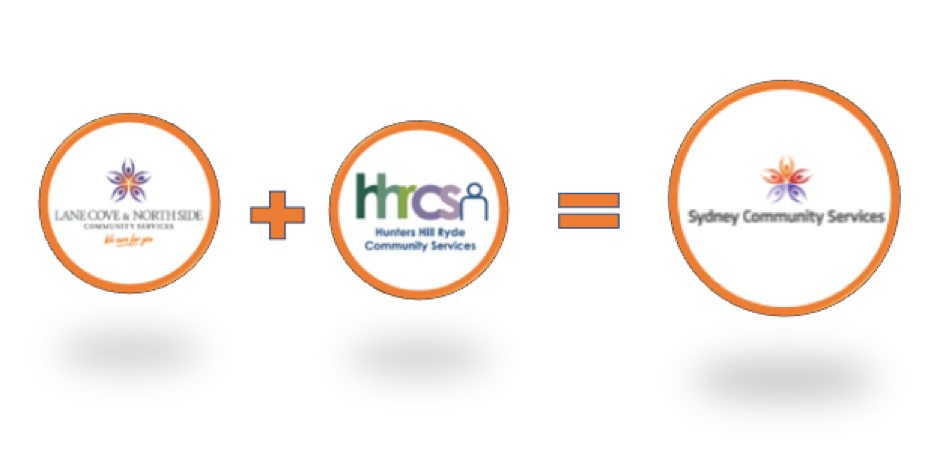
SCS was established on the 1stof July 2017 following the amalgamation of Lane Cove North Side Community Services (LCNSCS) and Hunters Hill Ryde Community Services (HHRCS).

=== History of Lane Cove North Side Community Services (LCNSCS) ===
LCNSCS, originally Lane Cove Community Aid Service (LCCAS), was officially established in 1961. However, LCCAS's history begins before this as the Pool of Service, a community service organisation that was created by Lane Cove local Mrs Claudia Leach. Whilst performing house-to-house visits as part of her campaign for election to Lane Cove Council Mrs Leach realised there was an enormous lack of community-based assistance. This led to her establishing the Pool of Service in 1959, which later became LCCAS.

In 1962 LCCAS became independent from Lane Cove Council. Since then LCCAS has developed a wide service base. The first programs introduced by LCCAS were Meals on Wheels and the Home Companion Service, a precursor to the current Nursing Service. Both programs began in the 1960s and continue to this day. In 1982 LCCAS introduced a Welfare Counselling service and later in 1983 the Friends of Community Aid Shop was opened and began raising funds through monthly craft projects. In order to meet increasing demand LCCAS began to introduce a greater variety of services. Home Maintenance and Modification Services began in 1987. Between 2002 and 2004 the organisation introduced the Easy-Care Gardening Service, the In-Home Podiatry Service and Linen Service. Later LCCAS received funding to extend services to people living in the local government areas (LGAs) of Mosman, North Sydney and Willoughby. Following this expansion, the organisation was renamed to Lane Cove and North Side Community Services (LCNSCS).

=== History of Hunters Hill Ryde Community Services (HHRCS) ===
HHRCS, originally Gladesville Community Aid and Information Service Inc., was founded by several prominent residents and business owners of the Gladesville area. Each business donated £10 towards the first budget and these funds were used to open a community center, which was founded on the 24th of November 1966. The center moved between three different locations before the headquarters were officially opened in Cowell Street Gladesville in 1975. The Hunters Hill Respite Care Centre was officially opened in 1990 at the St Joseph Hostel and in 1995 was moved to its current location at 42 Gladesville Road. In 1999 the Neighbourhood Centre opened at 46 Gladesville Road where it also remains to this day.

Throughout these relocations the organisation established and expanded its program and service base. Several key programs include, Meals on Wheels which began in 1967, migrant conversation groups in 1979, Learning for Leisure in 1983 and the Culturally and Linguistically Diverse (CALD) program in 2006. In 2008 Gladesville Community Aid and Information Service Inc, Hunters Hill Respite Care Centre Inc and the Brain Injury Respite Development Service Inc amalgamated and became Hunters Hill Ryde Community Services (HHRCS).

=== History of Sydney Community Services (SCS) ===
Established in 2017 SCS has a relatively recent history as an organisation. Its headquarters are located at Pottery Lane in Lane Cove. However, the offices and community centres that established HHRCS also remain open and continue in their provision of services. SCS now provides services to people living in the Lane Cove, Ryde and Hunters Hill LGA's. However, some programs such as Social Support, CALD and Podiatry services are offered to the whole of Northern Sydney.

== Services and Programs ==
SCS provides ‘support and assistance to those who are elderly, frail, socially isolated, people with a disability or experiencing financial disadvantage in the community’. There are three distinct groups that SCS provides services to, Seniors, Persons with Disabilities and the broader Community.

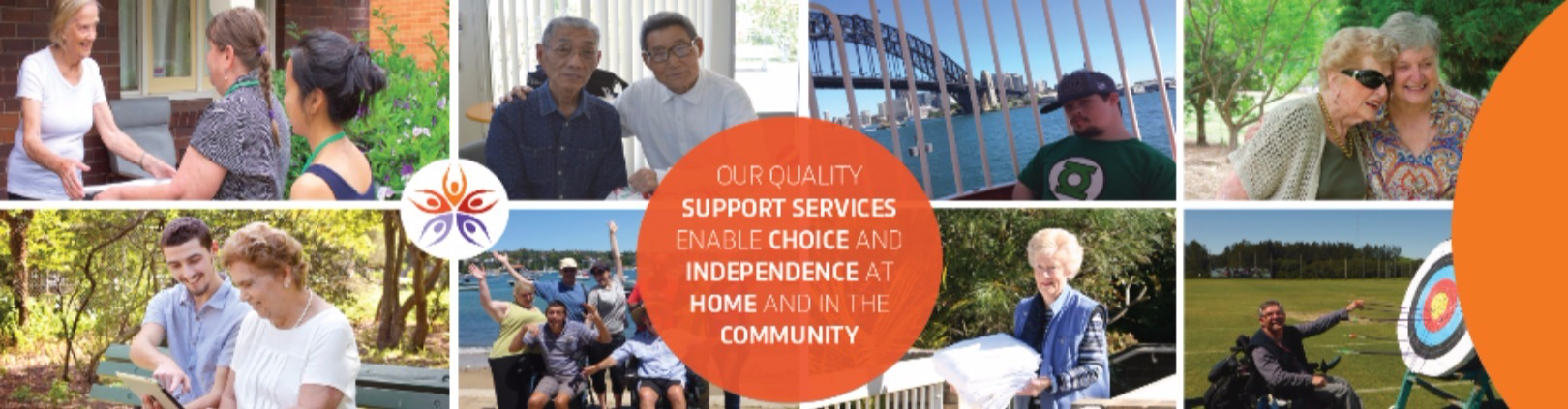
SCS provides ‘support and assistance to those who are elderly, frail, socially isolated, people with a disability or experiencing financial disadvantage in the community’.

=== Seniors ===
A range of services are available for seniors, who are those aged 65 and over. First and foremost, SCS functions as a Community Advisory Service, providing information about community services as well as government programs, such as NDIS funded services, Targeted Early Intervention Programs as well as My Aged Care and Home Care Packages.

Several programs are run aiming to assist the unpaid primary carers of seniors. Carers Support Groups are available for carers of a person with an aged-related condition. These groups seek to provide information, support, advocacy and regular breaks from the caring role. The Flexible Respite Service ensures carers can take regular breaks from their caring role by providing support to care recipients either in home or in the community. The service involves home visits, accompanied outings, assistance in accomplishing a particular task such as a hobby and phone monitoring services. The Seniors Hub is based in Hunters Hill and is open Mondays to Fridays. Programs are run daily and include a range of activities for seniors, such as outings, exercise, music, craft, games, picnics and special events. SCS also provides various home-based services. These include the, Community Visitors Program, Home Delivered Meals, Shopping Assistance and a Linen Service. Further health focused services include, the Nursing and Podiatry programs. Gardening and Home Modification and Maintenance Services are run to help with the general up keep of people's gardens and homes when they are no longer able to do so themselves.

=== Persons With Disabilities ===
The services that SCS provides for people with a lifelong disability are made available through the National Disability Insurance Scheme (NDIS). Many of the same services that are available for seniors are also available for people with disabilities.

SCS runs Center-Based Programs from several locations in both the Hunters Hill and Lane Cove LGA's. Community Engagement programs, such as social clubs, outings and theatre ensemble “Different Degrees” are also run and aim to involve clients in their local communities. Also available are Shopping Services, Homes Delivered Meals and Linen Services. As are Gardening Services and Home Modification and Maintenance Services. Health focused services include Home Nursing, Podiatry and Medical Transport.

=== Community ===
The Community Connections programs offered by SCS are mainly tailored towards seniors, however these programs are open to any member of the community. SCS offers a variety of wellness and physical activities, including walking groups, table tennis, older women's wellness, Men's Shed and shuffle board. Further social activities are available and include the Seniors Hub, Scrabble group, bridge and chess, book club, learning for leisure and mah-jong. SCS also organises and runs social events, such as day trips, the BOOMers group and the Park View Café.

== Funding ==
Funding for SCS comes from the Commonwealth Government, State Government, Local Government, Independent Funding Sources and Fundraising. The organisation also has several supporters, such as local businesses, who contribute in a variety of different ways, offering valuable resources and expertise.

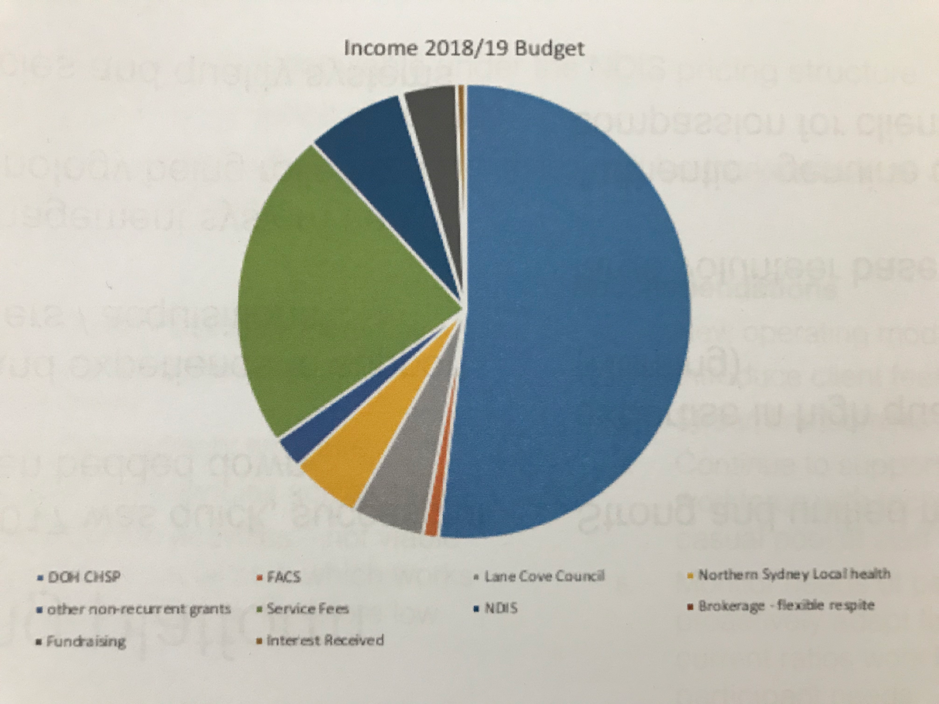
Funding Break Down for SCS 2018/19.

=== Government Funding ===
==== Commonwealth Government Funding ====
Commonwealth funding comes through the Department of Health (DoH). The DoH funds services for people over the age of 65 through several programs, including the Commonwealth Home Support Program (CHSP) and Community Visitors Scheme (CVS). Furthermore, SCS has status as an approved provider of services funded through the National Disability Insurance Scheme (NDIS). Those covered by NDIS are able to purchase services and support from SCS that are outlined in their assessed Support Plan.

The CHSP accounts for over 50% of SCS's funding. The CHSPis a consolidated program that provides basic home support for older persons that require assistance to keep living independently at home and to remain active members of the community. The CHSP brought together the Commonwealth Home and Community Care (HACC) Program, the National Respite for Careers Program (NRCP), the Day Therapy Centers (DTC) Program and the Assistance with Care and Housing for the Aged (ACHA) Program.

The NDIS provides support for Australians with a disability. NDIS funding is available to persons under the age of 65 with a permanent and significant disability. The scheme seeks to provide such persons with the reasonable and necessary social and economic support they need to live an ordinary life.

==== State Government Funding ====
Further funding is provided by the New South Wales State Government through programs run by the Department of Family and Community Services, such as the Community Builders Program. The Community Builders Program provides funding for services that strengthen and build community connections, for example through local community centres.

==== Local Government Funding ====
Local Government funding is sourced from the three LGA's that SCS services. Those are the Lane Cove Council, City of Ryde Council and Hunters Hill Council. This funding is secured through regular grant application processes.

=== Private Funding ===
==== Independent Funding ====
Independent funding is provided by a range of organisations. This includes a number of local RSL Clubs who provide funding through the Clubs NSW Grant Scheme. These RSL clubs include Chatswood, Gladesville, North Ryde and Ryde Eastwood Leagues Club. Street Smart is another group providing funding to SCS and its programs.

==== Fundraising ====
SCS also raises its own funds through a variety of events, including the Hunters Hill Food and Wine Festival and annual raffles.

==== Supporters ====
Support for SCS is not restricted to funds-based assistance. SCS receives a variety of support from a diverse array of organisations and business. Current supporters are listed below:

- Bakers Delight
- Discover Hunters Hill
- Holden
- IGA
- Rotary Club of Lane Cove
- Rotary International
- Hunters Hill Rotary Club
- Lane Cove Country Club
- URM
- LJHooker
- Anglican Parish of Hunters Hill
- Grill’d
- GladesHill Presbyterian Church
- Ciena
- Westpac
- Dooley's Lidcome Catholic Club
- Sea Horse Society
- Hunters Hill quilters
- Marist Fathers Association
- Longueville Hotel

=== The Future of Funding ===
The Living Longer Living Better Federal reforms for aged care is drastically changing the way in which federal funding is provided to the aged care sector. The reforms will see the entire sector shift into Integrated Care at Home Package Programs by 2020. Therefore, a large proportion of SCS's services will be funded differently in the near future.

== Volunteers ==
Volunteers are a crucial aspect of SCS's ability to provide its services, and as such are regarded as "the most valued members of our organisation". As for many not-for-profits volunteering is a significant aspect of the continued provision of services, which are being demand at increasing rates nationwide. In order to provide its services SCS has a team of over 400 volunteers. These volunteers fulfil a variety of roles supporting the programs that SCS runs either on its own or as part of government programs. Volunteers assist vulnerable members of the community, including those with a disability, the frail and the elderly by connecting them to valuable support services and also to the community.

== Priorities ==
SCS's Mission is "to enhance people's quality of life and independence by providing a range of health and community services".
