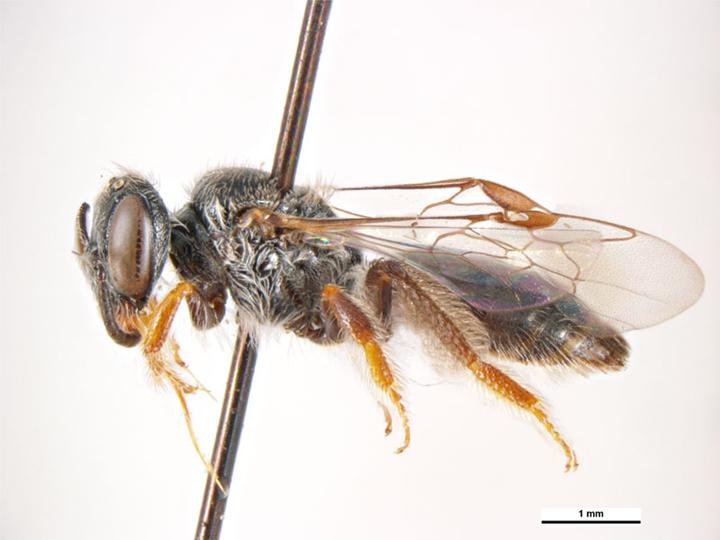
- Female

Scientific classification
- Kingdom: Animalia
- Phylum: Arthropoda
- Clade: Pancrustacea
- Class: Insecta
- Order: Hymenoptera
- Family: Colletidae
- Genus: Leioproctus
- Species: L. filamentosus

Binomial name
- Leioproctus filamentosus (Rayment, 1959)

Synonyms
- Filiglossa filamentosa Rayment, 1959

= Leioproctus filamentosus =

Species of bee

Leioproctus filamentosus, or Leioproctus (Filiglossa) filamentosus, is a species of bee in the family Colletidae and subfamily Colletinae. It is endemic to Australia. It was described by Australian entomologist Tarlton Rayment in 1959.

== Description ==
Male body length about 5.4 mm, and slender. Integumental colouration mainly black, hair white.

== Distribution and habitat ==
The species occurs in eastern Australia. The type locality is Lane Cove, Sydney.

== Behaviour ==
The adults are flying mellivores. Flowering plants visited by the bees include Persoonia species.

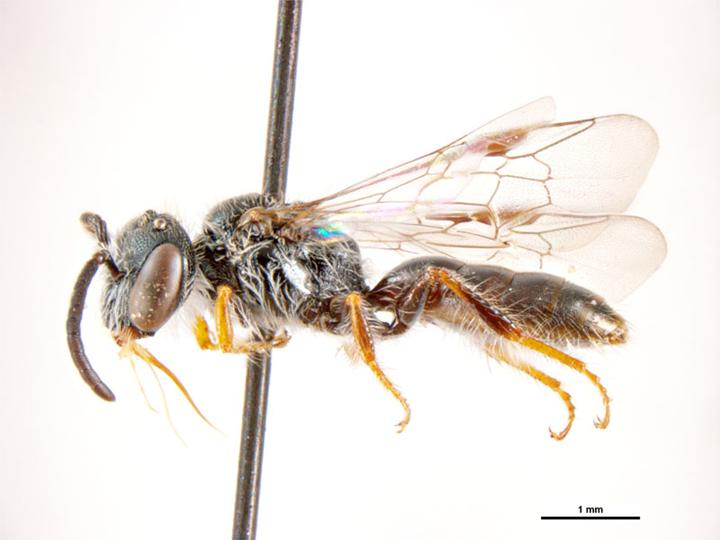
Male
