= Northwood House, Northwood =

Northwood House
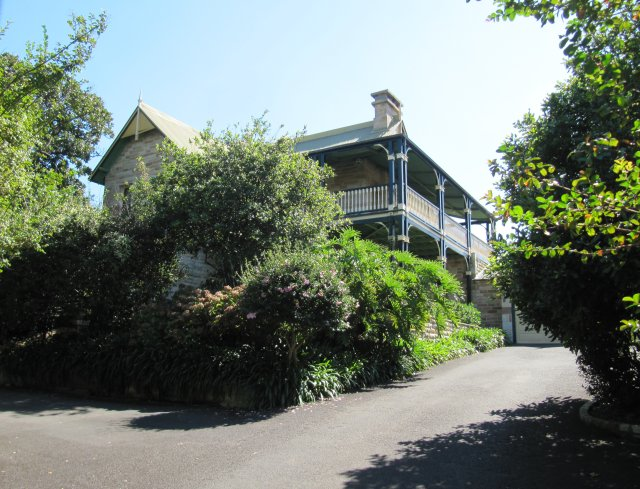
- Northwood House, hidden behinds its front garden

- Location within Sydney Location within Australia
- 33°49′41″S 151°10′46″E
- Location: 1 Private Road, Northwood, Municipality of Lane Cove, New South Wales, Australia

History
- Built: 1878

Site notes
- Architect: Edmund Blacket

New South Wales Heritage Register
- Official name: Northwood House & Cottage
- Type: State heritage (built)
- Designated: 2 April 1999
- Reference no.: 440
- Type: Mansion
- Category: Residential buildings (private)
- Builders: John and James Eaton

Northwood House is a heritage-listed former home for mentally handicapped children and now residence at 1 Private Road, Northwood in the Lane Cove Council local government area of New South Wales, Australia. It was designed by Edmund Blacket and built during 1878 by John and James Eaton. It is also known as Northwood House & Cottage. It was added to the New South Wales State Heritage Register on 2 April 1999.

== History ==
Northwood House was built in 1878 for Mrs Jane Davy. It was designed by the architect Edmund Blacket and built by the brothers, John and James Eaton.

In 1874 Mrs Davy purchased 14 hectares (34 acres) of land (later adding another 11 acres) on the peninsula into the Lane Cove River that is now the suburb of Northwood. The suburb takes its name from Northwood House. The home had its private wharf in Gore Bay and later a ferry wharf was built at Northwood Point for the use of the family and later the community. Mrs Davy donated three acres of land at Northwood Point to Lane Cove Council for a park.

Mrs Davy was a member of the well-known Dawson family of Neutral Bay. She played an important role in the life of Lane Cove. Her son William nominated as an Alderman on Lane Cove Council and her son-in-law Joseph James Neave for whom she built adjoining "Burdoe" was a prominent Quaker. Joseph James Neave interceded with the author Tolstoi and the Tsar of Russia in 1899 to allow members of the persecuted Dukhobor sect to be transferred from Russia to Canada.

After Mrs Davy's death in 1903 the home and estate (divided into 48 blocks) were put on the market. It was purchased in early 1905 by Abdul Wade. A naturalised British subject, originally from Afghanistan, Wade was a prominent and well-respected businessman with interests in the camel transport industry, mining, salt production and wool growing. He also owned a large pastoral property west of Bourke, Wangamana Station. Wade lived at Northwood House for a number of years with his wife, Emily Wade, and their six children. It was rumoured that Wade lost the home in a poker game but all evidence suggests that he in fact subdivided the property and sold it off before leaving Australia in 1923. By 1919 the shingle roof had been replaced with tiles and the present two-storey stucco and shingle verandah added.

A number of prominent families have owned Northwood House since then. During World War II it was used by the owners as a school for mentally handicapped children.

On 10 August 1984 an Interim Conservation Order was placed over Northwood House as it was proposed to subdivide part of the grounds and involved demolition of the stables. In view of its heritage significance and to ensure future sympathetic development a Permanent Conservation Order was gazetted over Northwood House on 1 August 1986. It was transferred to the State Heritage Register on 2 April 1999.

== Description ==
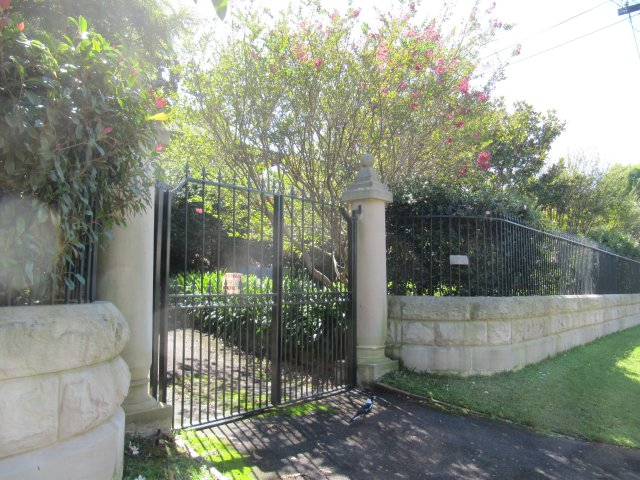
Fence and entrance gates

Northwood House is a two storied residence, constructed of solid sandstone with a tiled roof. It had a separate kitchen, office, stables and dairy.

=== Modifications and dates ===
- 1985 – Heritage Council approval for three car garage and cellar
- 1986 – Heritage Council approval for restoration work, alterations and additions and new landscaping

== Heritage listing ==
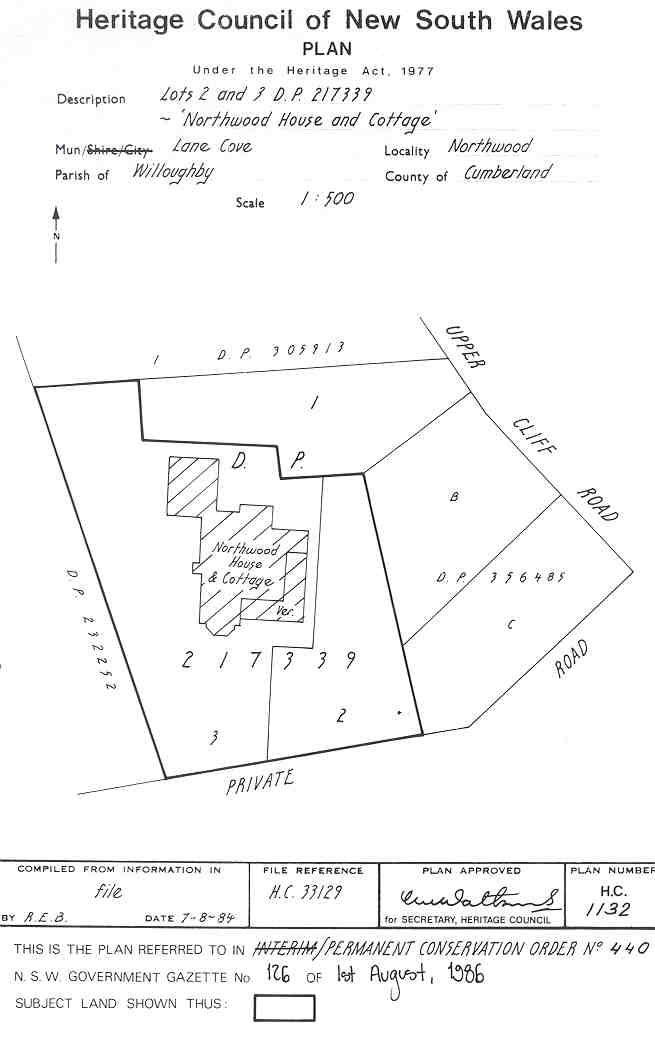
Heritage boundaries

As at 18 May 2012, constructed in 1878, Northwood House is a fine example of the domestic work of the Colonial Architect Edmund Blacket. Northwood House is the home after which the suburb of Northwood was named. For almost a century it was the most significant home and hub of social life on the peninsula. Northwood House has been the home of many prominent citizens including Mrs. Jane Davy who was a member of the well-known Dawson family of Neutral Bay and played an important part in the life of Lane Cove.

Northwood House was listed on the New South Wales State Heritage Register on 2 April 1999.
