= Osborne Park, New South Wales =

Osborne Park Sydney, New South Wales
- Coordinates: 33.8163°S 151.1787°E
- Postcode(s): 2066
- Location: 9 km (6 mi) NW of Sydney CBD
- LGA(s): Municipality of Lane Cove
- State electorate(s): Lane Cove; Willoughby
- Federal division(s): North Sydney
Localities around Osborne Park:
Artarmon	Artarmon	Lane Cove
Lane Cove	Osborne Park	Gore Hill; St Leonards
Longueville	Northwood	Greenwich

Osborne Park is a former urban place on the North Shore of Sydney in the state of New South Wales, Australia. Osborne Park was located in the eastern part of the suburb of Lane Cove. Its designation as an urban place was withdrawn in 1999.

The locality was called after 'Osborne Park' (later called 'Kermadec') in Osborne Road, built by the future Prime Minister, Billy Hughes in 1906.

The Osborne Park Progress Association, founded in 1926, has developed tennis courts and other projects for community benefit.
