= St Leonards, New South Wales =

Suburb of Sydney, New South Wales

St Leonards
- Suburb
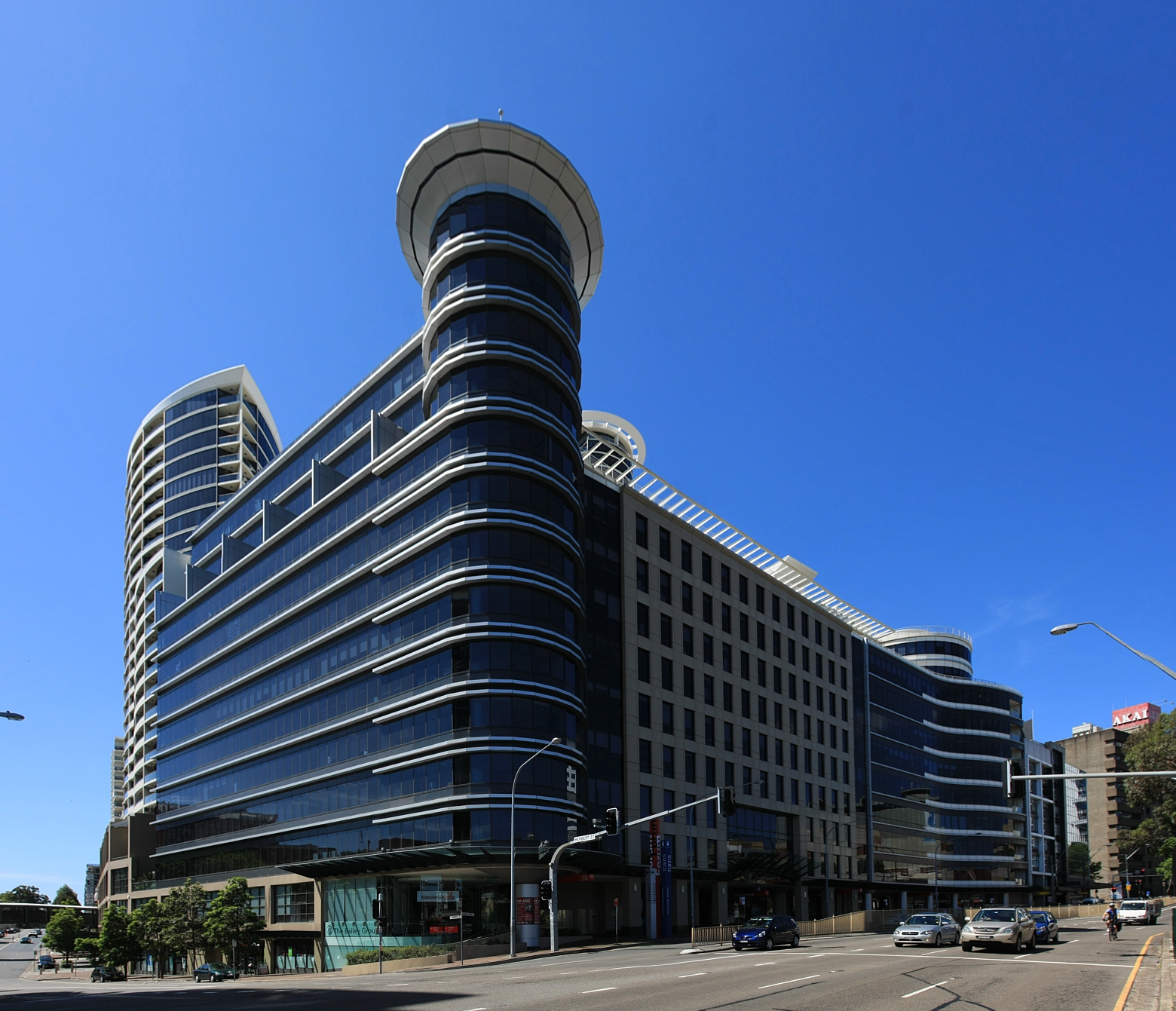
- The Forum

- Interactive map of St Leonards
- Country: Australia
- State: New South Wales
- City: Sydney
- LGAs: Municipality of Lane Cove; North Sydney Council; City of Willoughby
- Location: 5 km (3.1 mi) north of Sydney CBD
- Established: 1853

Government
  - State electorates: Lane Cove; North Shore; Willoughby
  - Federal division: Bennelong (Lane Cove) Bradfield (North Sydney and Willoughby)

Area
  - Total: 0.8 km^{2} (0.31 sq mi)
- Elevation: 101 m (331 ft)

Population
  - Total: 7,212 (SAL 2021)
  - Density: 9,015/km^{2} (23,350/sq mi)
- Postcode: 2065
Suburbs around St Leonards
Artarmon	Artarmon	Naremburn
Gore Hill; Osborne Park	St Leonards	Crows Nest
Greenwich	Wollstonecraft	Crows Nest

St Leonards is a suburb on the lower North Shore of Sydney, New South Wales, Australia. St Leonards is located 5 km (3.1 mi) north-west of the Sydney central business district and lies across the local government areas of Municipality of Lane Cove, North Sydney Council and the City of Willoughby.

== History ==
St Leonards was named after English statesman Viscount Sydney of St Leonards. Originally, St Leonards applied to the whole area from the present suburb of North Sydney to Gore Hill. The township of St Leonards in 1883 is now North Sydney.

St Leonards railway station is the oldest railway station on the North Shore railway line opening in 1890.

Gore Hill Cemetery was established on the Pacific Highway in 1868 and was the main burial site for the area until its closure in 1975. It is still maintained as a heritage site by the Department of Local Government and Lands, Willoughby Municipal Council and the Heritage Council of New South Wales.

== Heritage listings ==
St Leonards has a number of heritage-listed sites, including:

- Pacific Highway: Gore Hill Cemetery

== Population ==
In the 2021 Census, there were 7,212 people in St Leonards. 36.7% of people were born in Australia. The next most common countries of birth were China (without SARs and Taiwan) 9.6%, India 5.5%, Hong Kong 4.9%, Japan 4.4%, and England 3.3%. 47.5% of people spoke only English at home. Other languages spoken at home included Mandarin 11.8%, Cantonese 7.9%, Japanese 4.9%, Hindi 2.6% and Korean 2.4%. The most common responses for religion were No Religion 49.1% and Catholic 14.9%.

== Commercial area ==
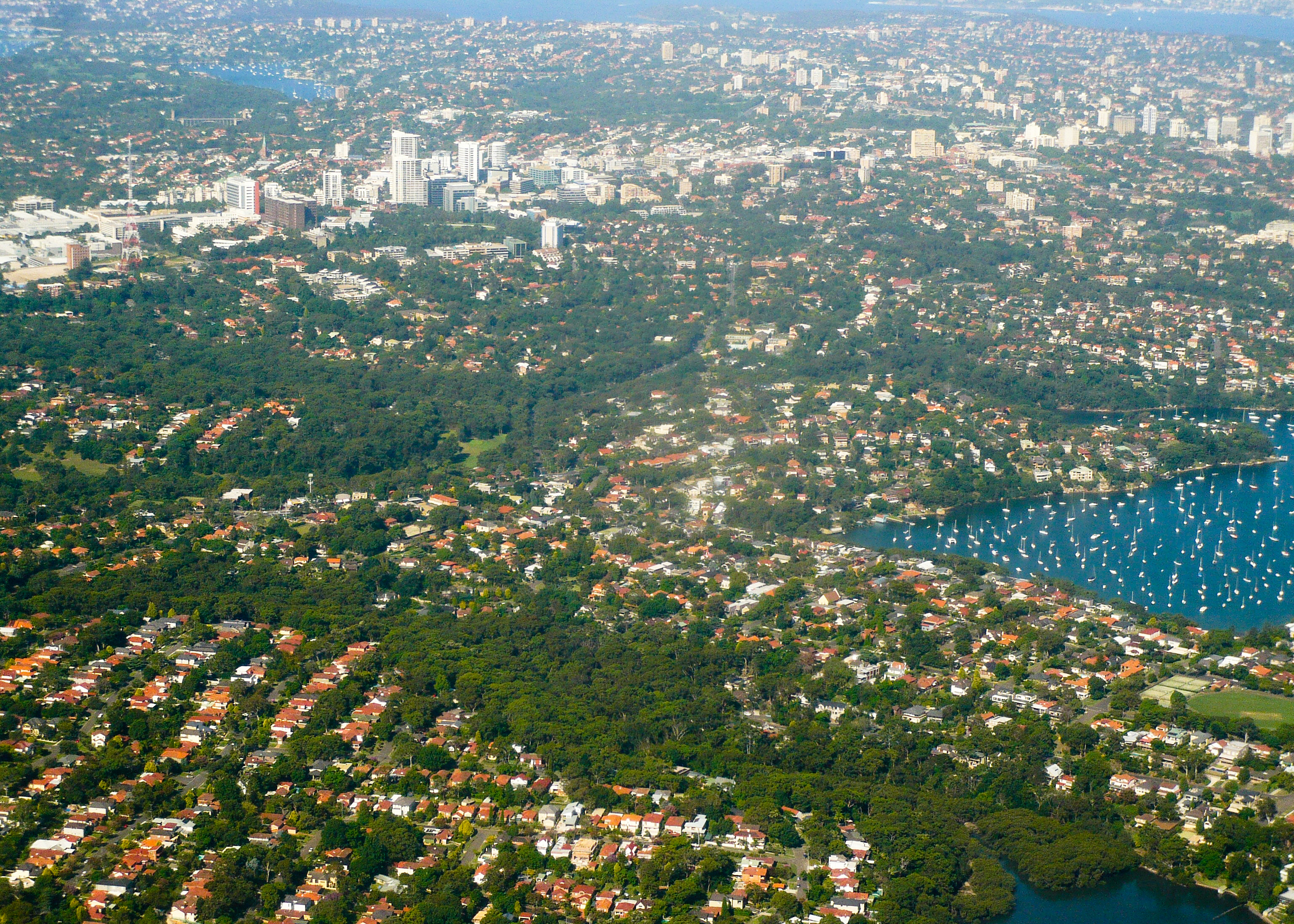
An aerial view of St Leonards and the surrounding suburbs of Longueville and Riverview

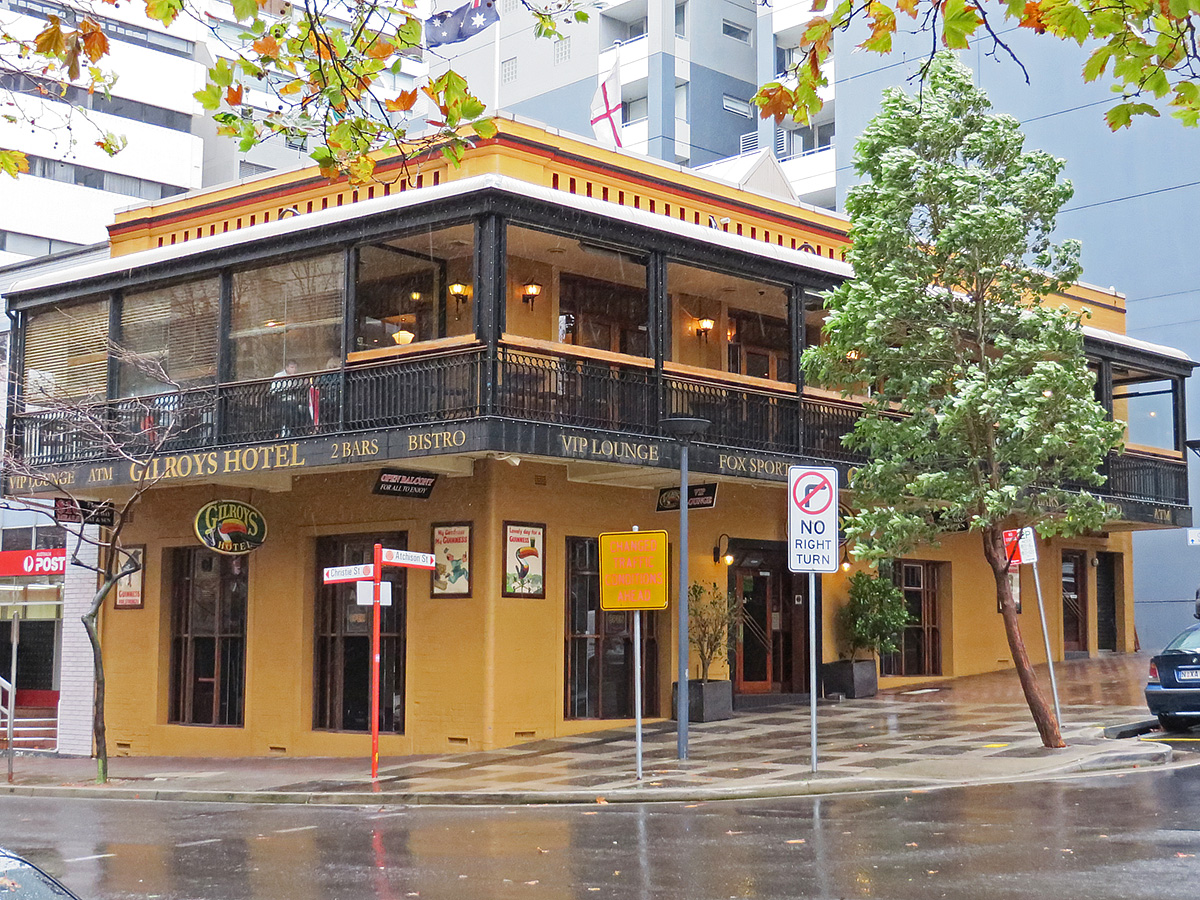
Gilroys Hotel

St Leonards has a commercial centre that complements the role of Chatswood, Lane Cove and North Sydney as one of the centres for business on the North Shore of Sydney. St Leonards contains one of Sydney's suburban skyscraper clusters, with major offices for large companies including CIMIC Group, IBM, Lenovo, Manchester Unity, Oporto, Savvytel, Toyota Australia, 2UE and Channel 31. Fox Sports studios are located at the Gore Hill end.

=== The Forum ===
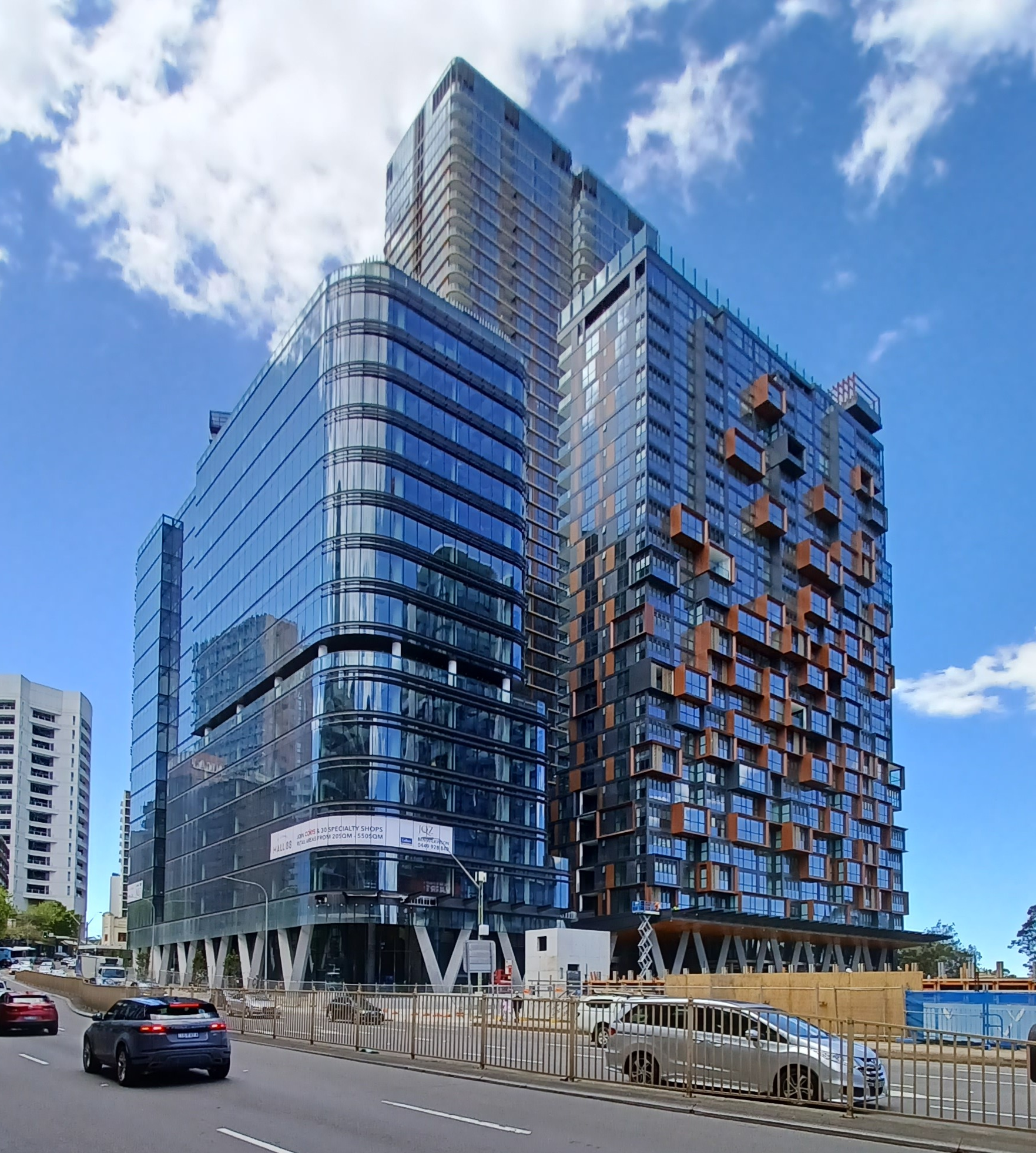
Residential towers on Christie Street

The Forum is built over the railway station and comprises three commercial office buildings, two residential towers containing 782 apartments, an independent mini-supermarket, and 34 food and retail shops.

Forum Tower (118m/38 stories) was the suburb's first high-rise apartment building complex completed in August 1999 and Forum West 3 three years later. Both buildings boast a concierge, pool, spa, gym and private & public car parking facilities each. Winten Property Group was responsible for the construction of both Forum buildings.

The Plaza also contains offices for Cisco, Verizon Business, Getty Images among other companies.

== Transport ==
St Leonards railway station is on the North Shore railway line of the Sydney Trains network. Crows Nest railway station borders the suburb. The Pacific Highway is the major road through the suburb. Bus services through St Leonards are operated by Busways, CDC NSW and Keolis Northern Beaches.

== Health ==
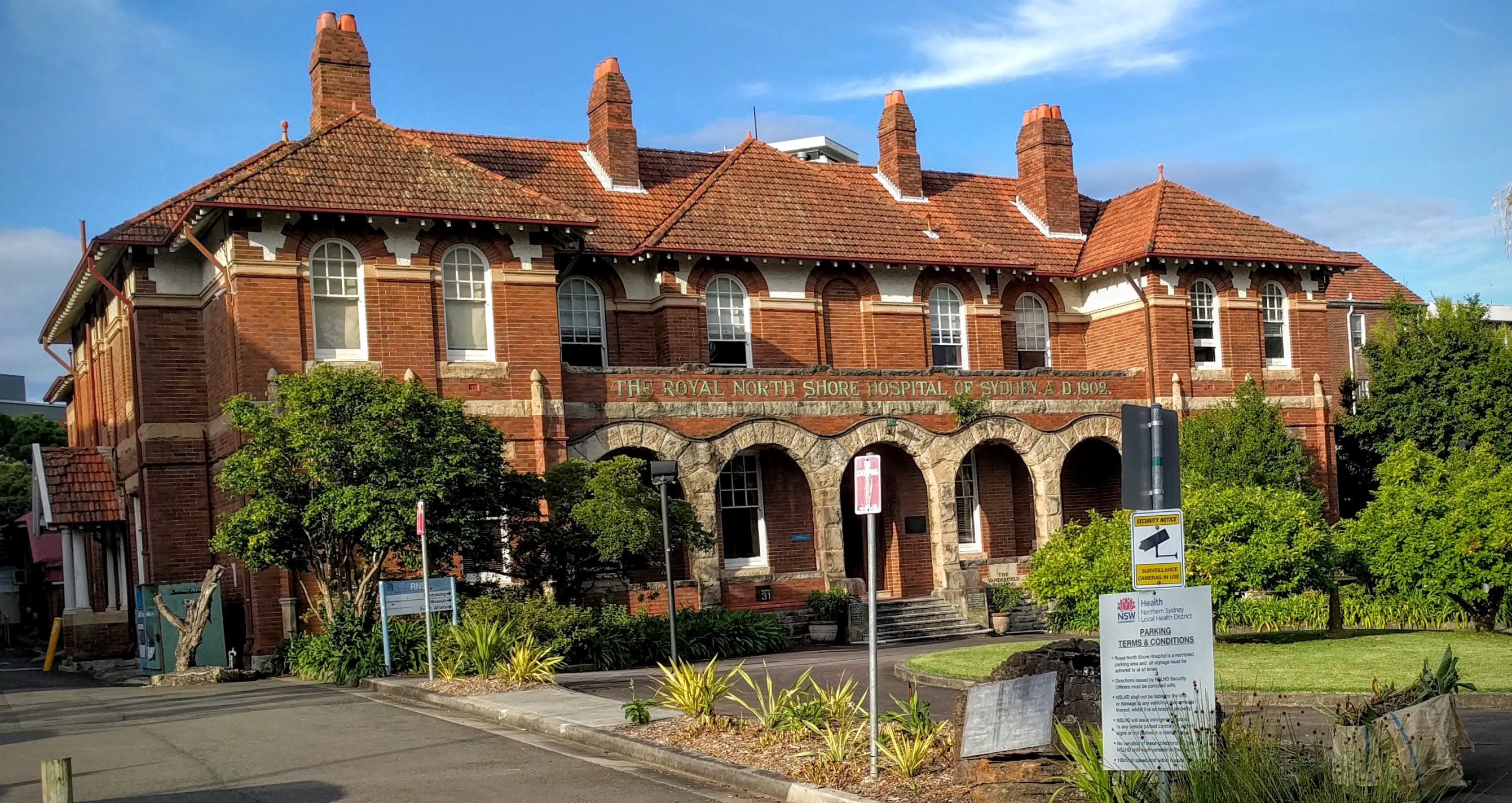
The Vanderfield Building, Royal North Shore Hospital

A major landuse in the suburb is the Royal North Shore Hospital which is one of the largest hospitals in Sydney.

== Schools and churches ==
- A campus of the University of Technology Sydney
- The campus of Northern Sydney TAFE
- Northside Community Church
- Royal North Shore Hospital Chapel

== Sport and recreation ==
St Leonards has developed into somewhat of a home for rugby union with the former headquarters of the Australian Rugby Union located at St Leonards (2007-2018), from neighbouring North Sydney. The Northern Suburbs Rugby Club has its clubhouse in St Leonards, featuring the Cabana Bar and Lounge. It also has a popular Rock Climbing Facility for the climbing community.

Gore Hill Oval, located on the grounds of Royal North Shore Hospital, is a synthetic field for AFL & cricket, ½ basketball court, handball courts, perimeter walking track, 2 exercise equipment stations and a playground. It is also the home ground of Australian rules football club, North Shore Bombers.
