= William Gore (provost marshal) =

William Gore (1765 – 1845) was a provost marshal in the Colony of New South Wales during the early 1800s. During the Rum rebellion he was imprisoned for his support of Governor William Bligh. Gore was released after two years but later in his career was again incarcerated for unpaid debts and for wilfully shooting a soldier.

Gore was the first British settler of Artarmon, which is now a suburb in the Lower North Shore of Sydney. The suburb of Gore Hill, which was part of his original Artarmon land grant, is named after him.

== Early life ==
Gore was born into the reputable Anglo-Irish Gore family of County Sligo in Ireland. He was briefly imprisoned by Irish rebels during the 1798 Irish Rebellion.

== Provost marshal of New South Wales ==
In 1805 he was appointed to the position of Provost marshal in the colony of New South Wales. He travelled with Captain William Bligh who was to take up the position of Governor of New South Wales.

=== Taken prisoner during the Rum Rebellion ===
Gore was a strong supporter of Governor Bligh and aided him in his efforts to reform the corrupt administration of the officers of the New South Wales Corps. Gore was ordered to arrest John Macarthur who was a leading individual in the racketeering that had overtaken the colony. This led to the Rum Rebellion of 1808, where Macarthur and his co-conspirators in the New South Wales Corps mutinied against Governor Bligh and placed him under arrest.

Gore was also taken prisoner for his involvement in arresting Macarthur and placed under trumped-up charges of perjury. In a show trial where Gore refused to plead due to the illegality of the court, Lieutenant Anthony Fenn Kemp found him guilty and sentenced him to seven years transportation to the convict settlement at Newcastle.

He laboured in Newcastle as a convict for two years digging coal before being ordered to England to act as a witness in the court martial against Major George Johnston who was in charge of the New South Wales Corps during the Rum Rebellion. Gore's wife and children were evicted from their home during his imprisonment and had to live off charity. His wife developed chronic asthma during this time, a condition she later died of.

=== Re-appointment as provost marshal and imprisonment for debts ===
Governor Lachlan Macquarie who took control of the colony in 1810, declared all trials held by the New South Wales Corps as invalid and re-appointed Gore to the position of provost marshal in 1812. A year later, Macquarie gave Gore a land grant of 150 acres on the northern side of Sydney Harbour. Gore named this property Artarmon which was derived from the Gore family's Ard tarmon estate in Sligo.

In 1817, Gore came upon financial difficulties and was arrested and imprisoned in 1818 for his debts. He escaped from jail and fled to Van Diemen's Land but was captured and returned to Sydney. Following his return Macquarie suspended Gore from his duties owing to him being in gaol, and because of the numerous complaints made against him. He then retired to his Artarmon property.

== Later life ==
=== Shooting of a soldier ===
In 1824, Gore was charged with the shooting and wounding of a soldier. The soldier, Andrew Beattie of the 48th Regiment, was on grass-cutting duty near Artarmon and Gore wounded him with bird-shot from a fowling rifle when he suspected him of stealing his grass. Gore was sentenced to life imprisonment at Newcastle. He attempted suicide in the court when he received his verdict. Gore was pardoned by Governor Thomas Brisbane in 1825 and returned to Artarmon.

=== Death ===
Gore was still heavily in debt in his old age and had mortgaged his property to several individuals. He was declared insolvent in 1843 and died in 1845. Richard Hayes Harnett, who purchased the Artarmon estate after Gore's death, found the coffins and remains of Gore and one of his daughters still unburied covered in palings in a bushy area of the property. His remains were later interred.

== Legacy ==
The Sydney suburb of Gore Hill and the associated Gore Hill Freeway are named after him and the adjoining suburb of Artarmon was named by him.
