= Lane Cove Council =

- Local government area
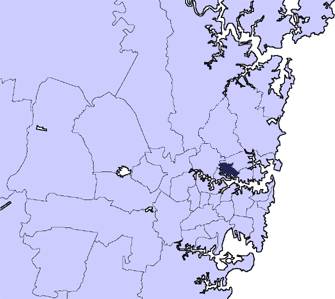
- Location in Metropolitan Sydney

- Interactive map of Lane Cove Council
- Coordinates: 33°45′S 151°09′E
- Country: Australia
- State: New South Wales
- Region: North Shore
- Established: 11 February 1895
- Council seat: Lane Cove

Government
  - Mayor: Merri Southwood
  - State electorates: Lane Cove; North Shore
  - Federal division: Bennelong

Area
  - Total: 11 km^{2} (4.2 sq mi)

Population
  - Totals: 39,438 (2021 census); 39,486 (2023 est.)
  - Density: 3,590/km^{2} (9,300/sq mi)
- Website: Lane Cove Council
LGAs around Lane Cove Council
Ryde	Willoughby	Willoughby
Ryde	Lane Cove Council	North Sydney
Hunter's Hill	Hunter's Hill	Inner West & Sydney

Lane Cove Council is a local government area located on the Lower North Shore of Sydney, New South Wales, Australia. The administrative seat of Lane Cove is located 10 kilometres (6.2 mi) north-west of the Sydney central business district.

The council comprises an area of 11 square kilometres (4.2 sq mi), and as at the 2021 census had an estimated population of 39,438.

The mayor of Lane Cove Council since 10 October 2024 is Councillor Merri Southwood, an independent candidate.

== Location ==
On the western and southern borders is the Lane Cove River with the Ryde and Hunter's Hill, across the river on the western and southern banks respectively. To the north is the Willoughby and to the east is North Sydney.

== Suburbs and localities in the local government area ==
Suburbs in the Municipality of Lane Cove are:

- Greenwich
- Lane Cove
- Lane Cove North (shared with Willoughby)
- Lane Cove West
- Linley Point
- Longueville
- Northwood
- Riverview
- St Leonards (shared with Willoughby and North Sydney)

Localities in the municipality are:

- Blaxlands Corner
- Gore Hill
- Palm Gardens
- Osborne Park

== Demographics ==
At the 2016 census there were 36,051 people in the Lane Cove local government area, of these 49.2 per cent were male and 50.2 per cent were female. Aboriginal and Torres Strait Islander people made up 0.3 per cent of the population; significantly below the NSW and Australian averages of 2.9 and 2.8 per cent respectively. The median age of people in the Municipality of Lane Cove was 36 years; slightly lower than the national median of 38 years. Children aged 0 – 14 years made up 18.5 per cent of the population and people aged 65 years and over made up 13.7 per cent of the population. Of people in the area aged 15 years and over, 51.8 per cent were married and 10.4 per cent were either divorced or separated.

Population growth in the Municipality of Lane Cove between the 2001 census and the 2006 census was 0.29 per cent; and in the subsequent five years to the 2011 census, population growth was 3.44 per cent. At the 2016 census, the population in the Municipality increased by 14.41 per cent. When compared with total population growth of Australia for the same period, being 8.8 per cent, population growth in the Lane Cove local government area was significantly higher than the national average. The median weekly income for residents within the Municipality of Lane Cove was significantly higher than the national average.

Selected historical census data for Lane Cove local government area
Census year		2001	2006	2011	2016
Population	Estimated residents on census night	30,340	30,427	31,510	36,051
Population	LGA rank in terms of size within New South Wales			58th	▲56th
Population	% of New South Wales population			0.81%	▼0.48%
Population	% of Australian population	0.27%	▼0.26%	0.26%	▼0.15%
Population	Estimated ATSI population on census night	72	62	79	118
Population	% of ATSI population to residents	0.2%	0.2%	▲0.3%	0.3%
Cultural and language diversity					
Ancestry, top responses	English			23.7%	▼22.6%
Ancestry, top responses	Australian			21.2%	▼18.3%
Ancestry, top responses	Irish			9.9%	▼9.6%
Ancestry, top responses	Chinese			6.5%	▲8.3%
Ancestry, top responses	Scottish			7.0%	▼6.7%
Language, top responses (other than English)	Mandarin	1.6%	▲2.3%	▲2.9%	▲4.7%
Language, top responses (other than English)	Cantonese	3.1%	3.1%	3.1%	3.1%
Language, top responses (other than English)	Spanish	n/c	n/c	▲1.1%	▲1.3%
Language, top responses (other than English)	Japanese	0.9%	▲1.0%	▼0.9%	▲1.2%
Language, top responses (other than English)	Persian (excluding Dari)	n/c	n/c	n/c	▲1.2%
Religious affiliation					
Religious affiliation, top responses	No religion, so described	17.1%	▲19.5%	▲24.8%	▲32.0%
Religious affiliation, top responses	Catholic	29.4%	29.4%	▲29.6%	▼26.9%
Religious affiliation, top responses	Anglican	20.7%	▼19.3%	▼17.5%	▼13.0%
Religious affiliation, top responses	Not stated	n/c	n/c	n/c	▲8.4%
Religious affiliation, top responses	Buddhism	n/c	n/c	▲2.6%	▲3.1%
Median weekly incomes					
Personal income	Median weekly personal income		A$811	A$970	A$1,149
Personal income	% of Australian median income		174.0%	168.1%	173.6%
Family income	Median weekly family income		A$1,729	A$2,637	A$2,971
Family income	% of Australian median income		168.4%	178.1%	171.3%
Household income	Median weekly household income		A$2,295	A$2,181	A$2,376
Household income	% of Australian median income		196.0%	176.7%	165.2%
Dwelling structure					
Dwelling type	Separate house	48.9%	▲49.8%	49.8%	▼42.3%
Dwelling type	Semi-detached, terrace or townhouse	6.1%	▼5.4%	▲6.0%	▼5.5%
Dwelling type	Flat or apartment	43.6%	▲44.1%	▼43.6%	▲51.6%

== Council ==
=== Current composition and election method ===
A map of the three wards, showing party representation as of the 2021 local elections.

Lane Cove Municipal Council is composed of nine councillors elected proportionally as three separate wards, each ward electing three councillors. All councillors are elected for a fixed four-year term of office. The mayor and deputy mayor are elected by the councillors at the first meeting of the council. The most recent election was held on 4 December 2021, and the makeup of the council is as follows:

Party	Councillors
Independents	5
Australian Labor Party	2
The Greens	1
One Nation	1
Total	9

The current Council, elected in 2024 is:

Ward	Councillor	Party	Notes
Central Ward	Kathy Bryla	Independent	
Central Ward	Bridget Kennedy	Independent	Deputy Mayor Jan–Sep 2022. Deputy Mayor 2024 - current.
Central Ward	Caleb Taylor	Independent	
East Ward	Merri Southwood	Independent	Deputy Mayor, 2022–2023. Mayor 2024 - current.
East Ward	Helena Greenwell	Independent	
East Ward	David Roenfeldt	Labor	Deputy Mayor, 2023–2024.
West Ward	Scott Bennison	One Nation	Elected 2008; Deputy Mayor, 2018–2019; Mayor, 2012–2013, 2023–2024. Elected as Independent. Joined One Nation 2025
West Ward	Katie Little	Labor	
West Ward	Rochelle Flood	The Greens	

== Election results ==
=== 2024 ===
2024 New South Wales local elections: Lane Cove
Party	Votes	%	Swing	Seats	Change
Labor	5,402	23.0	−0.1	2	▼1
Greens	3,399	14.5	+9.0	1	Steady
Independents	14,681	62.5	+22.0	6	▲4
Formal votes	23,482	94.6			
Informal votes	1,338	5.4			
Total	24,820				

== Council history ==
In May 1865, 67 residents of the rural District of Willoughby, which included what is now Lane Cove, sent a petition to the governor Sir John Young, requesting the incorporation of the "Municipality of North Willoughby". This resulted in the municipality being formally proclaimed on 23 October 1865.

There were no wards until 1876 when the council was divided into three wards: Chatsworth Ward to the north, Middle Harbour Ward to the east and Lane Cove Ward to the west. Lane Cove Ward subsequently became the separate "Borough of Lane Cove" on 11 February 1895. With the passing of the Local Government Act, 1906, the name was changed to be the "Municipality of Lane Cove" and with the passing of the Local Government Act, 1993, the council legally changed to "Lane Cove Council" and aldermen were retitled councillors.

A 2015 review of local government boundaries by the NSW Government Independent Pricing and Regulatory Tribunal recommended that the Municipality of Lane Cove merge with the councils across the river. The government proposed a merger of the Hunter's Hill, Lane Cove and Ryde Councils to form a new council with an area of 57 square kilometres (22 sq mi) and support a population of approximately 164,000. In July 2017, the Berejiklian government decided to abandon the forced merger of the Hunter's Hill, Lane Cove and Ryde local government areas, along with several other proposed forced mergers.

== Heritage listings ==
The Lane Cove Council has a number of heritage-listed sites, including:

- Greenwich, 95 River Road: Pallister, Greenwich
- Lane Cove, 334 Burns Bay Road: Carisbrook, Lane Cove
- Lane Cove North, 518 Pacific Highway: Chatswood South Uniting Church
- Linley Point, 360 Burns Bay Road: Linley House
- Northwood, 1 Private Road: Northwood House

== See also ==
- Local government areas of New South Wales
