= Carisbrook, Lane Cove =

Carisbrook
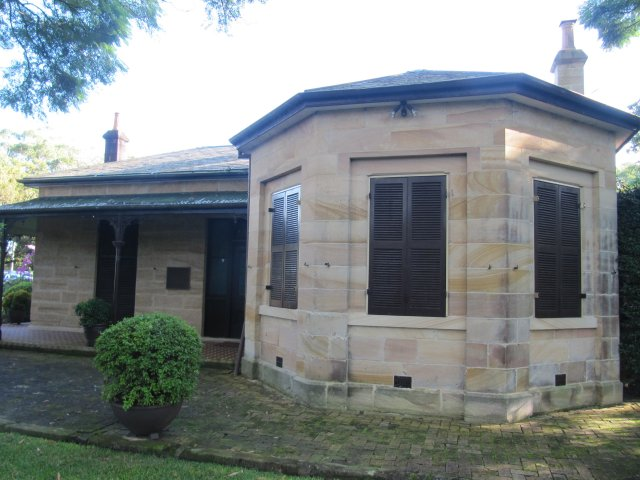

- Location within Sydney Location within Australia
- 33°49′24″S 151°09′01″E
- Location: 334 Burns Bay Road, Lane Cove, New South Wales, Australia

History
- Built: 1884

Site notes
- Architectural style: Victorian
- Owner: Lane Cove Council

New South Wales Heritage Register
- Official name: Carisbrook
- Type: State heritage (built)
- Designated: 2 April 1999
- Reference no.: 112
- Type: House
- Category: Residential buildings (private)

Carisbrook is a heritage-listed former private residence and now house and local history museum at 334 Burns Bay Road, Lane Cove, Sydney, Australia. It was built during 1884. The property is owned by Lane Cove Council.

== History ==
- 1835 – A land grant by purchase of 8.1 hectares (20 acres) to John Clarke, including present Carisbrook site.
- 1836 – Purchased by Richard Linley who installed a rope-making plant.
- 1860 – Several owners until Rachel Martha and Thomas Brooks moved into a weatherboard cottage on the site after their marriage in 1860
- 1884 – After the death of Thomas and Rachel in 1883, the son of the former Charles Phillips Brooks, built the stone residence called Carisbrook. Retaining a curtilage of land around the house and stretching down to Burns Bay, he subdivided the remainder of the land in 1885 as the Carisbrook Estate. After residing in it for only a year, the house was let to a number of tenants by Brooks, and by its successor owner, W. Bradley.
- 1920 – When acquired by Estate Agent, James Warr, in 1920, the land around the house was divided into six blocks. The house was let throughout Warr's ownership and until sold to Harry Thorne, a law clerk, and his wife Lucie, in 1940. It became their family residence for seventeen years. (Elliott)
- 1957 – It was sold to a milliner, James McDougall, who lived in it with his companion. Appreciating its heritage potential, he upgraded and gentrified the house, and particularly the gardens.
- 1966 – Prior to its purchase by Lane Cove Council in 1969 it was owned by the neighbouring manufacturing firm, Tuta Products, and served as its office and staff residence.
- 1969 – Carisbrook was purchased and restored by Lane Cove Council in 1969 to mark its 75th anniversary. Furnished by Lave Cove Historical Society, it has operated as a house and local history museum until the present.

In 1980 Lane Cove Council sought a Permanent Conservation Order for Carisbrook. In view of its heritage significance a Permanent Conservation Order was gazetted over Carisbrook on 26 June 1981.

== Description ==
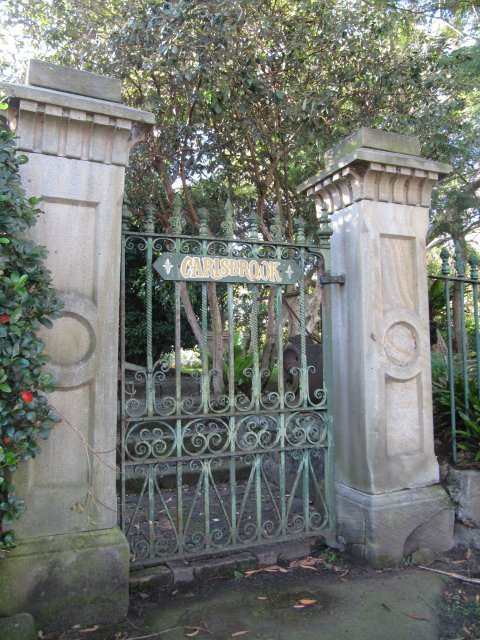
Entrance gates

A single-storey, sandstone house, built in 1884. Set in fine gardens with landscaped terraces down to the Lane Cove River. Has bay window and corner verandah, bearing bellcast iron roof, supported on cast iron columns with lace brackets. Main hipped roof is of slate. Windows and French doors have shutters which are not original. There is an attractive rear courtyard, walled with sandstone in the 1960s, and with its original well. The verandahs feature tessellated tiles - probably Minton pattern (bought from the Sydney Arcade which was being demolished in the 1960s).

=== Condition ===
As at 13 April 2000, the condition of the property was good. Its physical fabric is intact and largely original. Planned authentic restoration of its interior finishes and furnishings, based on a study, will enhance its integrity.

=== Modifications and dates ===
- 1940s – Door cut between present kitchen and museum room (then breakfast room).
- 1960s – Garage, laundry and courtyard wall built from sandstone transferred from the demolition of Amalfi, a Longueville mansion. Amalfi's fine picket iron fence and stone gate posts added. Verandahs tiled. Shutters added. Considerable landscaping.
- 1969-70 – Further restoration and sympathetic renovation of the interior.

== Heritage listing ==
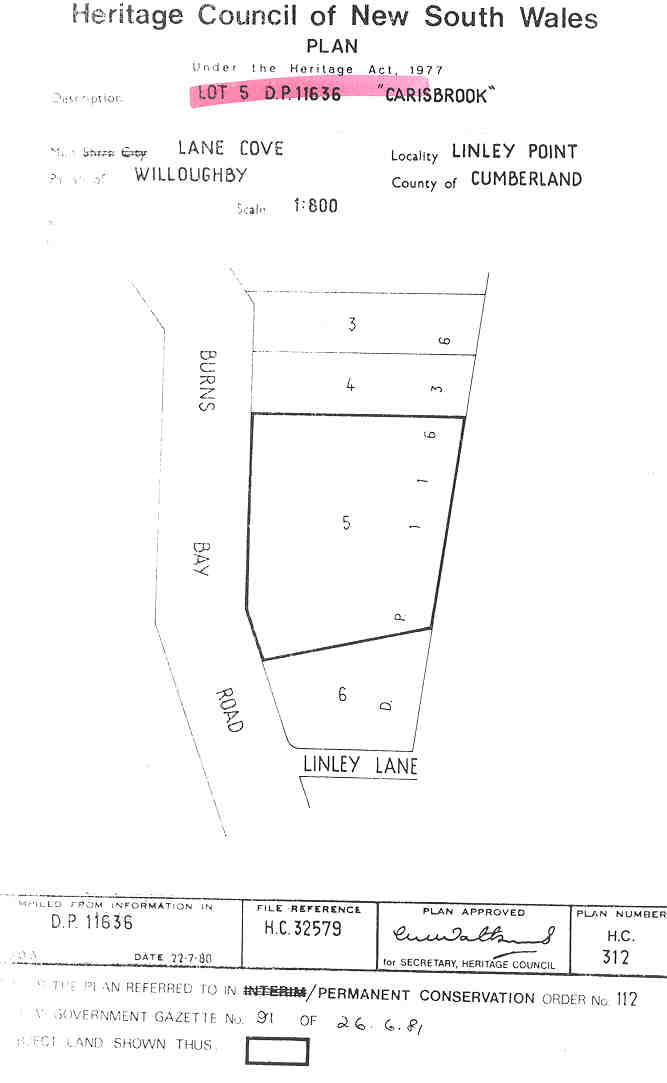
Heritage boundaries

As at 3 July 2012, Carisbrook, constructed in 1884 was a visually attractive and intact example of Victorian architecture, preserving many original features and furnished for public visitation as a period house museum. It is set in beautiful landscaped gardens stretching down to Burns Bay. (Heritage Branch files)

Carisbrook was listed on the New South Wales State Heritage Register on 2 April 1999 having satisfied the following criteria.

The place is important in demonstrating the course, or pattern, of cultural or natural history in New South Wales.

It is the earliest remaining house in the Linley Point area, being built in 1884.

It is representative of the impact of transport on subdivision and development, being built, and the land south of it being subdivided, just as the Fig Tree Bridge is being constructed nearby.

The place is important in demonstrating aesthetic characteristics and/or a high degree of creative or technical achievement in New South Wales.

It is set in a beautifully landscaped garden stretching down to Burns Bay. Constructed of sandstone, it is visually and architecturally very worthwhile, and preserves the majority of its original features.

The place has a strong or special association with a particular community or cultural group in New South Wales for social, cultural or spiritual reasons.

As a house museum it reflects changes in social life and household technology since 1884.

Hosting many community functions, and visits from individuals and groups of all ages, and serving as Lane Cove's only historical museum, open regularly to the public, it is an important focus of community life.

The place has potential to yield information that will contribute to an understanding of the cultural or natural history of New South Wales.

Because it is a fine example of Victorian architecture (the only Victorian house museum open to the public in Sydney), preserving many of its original features, it holds a unique position as a case study for visits by researchers and students of Victorian architecture and interiors. It is an ideal setting for on-site courses.

The place possesses uncommon, rare or endangered aspects of the cultural or natural history of New South Wales.

It is the oldest surviving home on Linley Point, and we have been informed is the only Victorian house museum in Sydney, open to the public.

The place is important in demonstrating the principal characteristics of a class of cultural or natural places/environments in New South Wales.

It is representative of a middle-class Victorian family home, and through its period interpretation, depicts aspects of Victorian family life.

== See also ==
- Australian residential architectural styles
