= Artarmon =

Suburb of Sydney, New South Wales

- Suburb
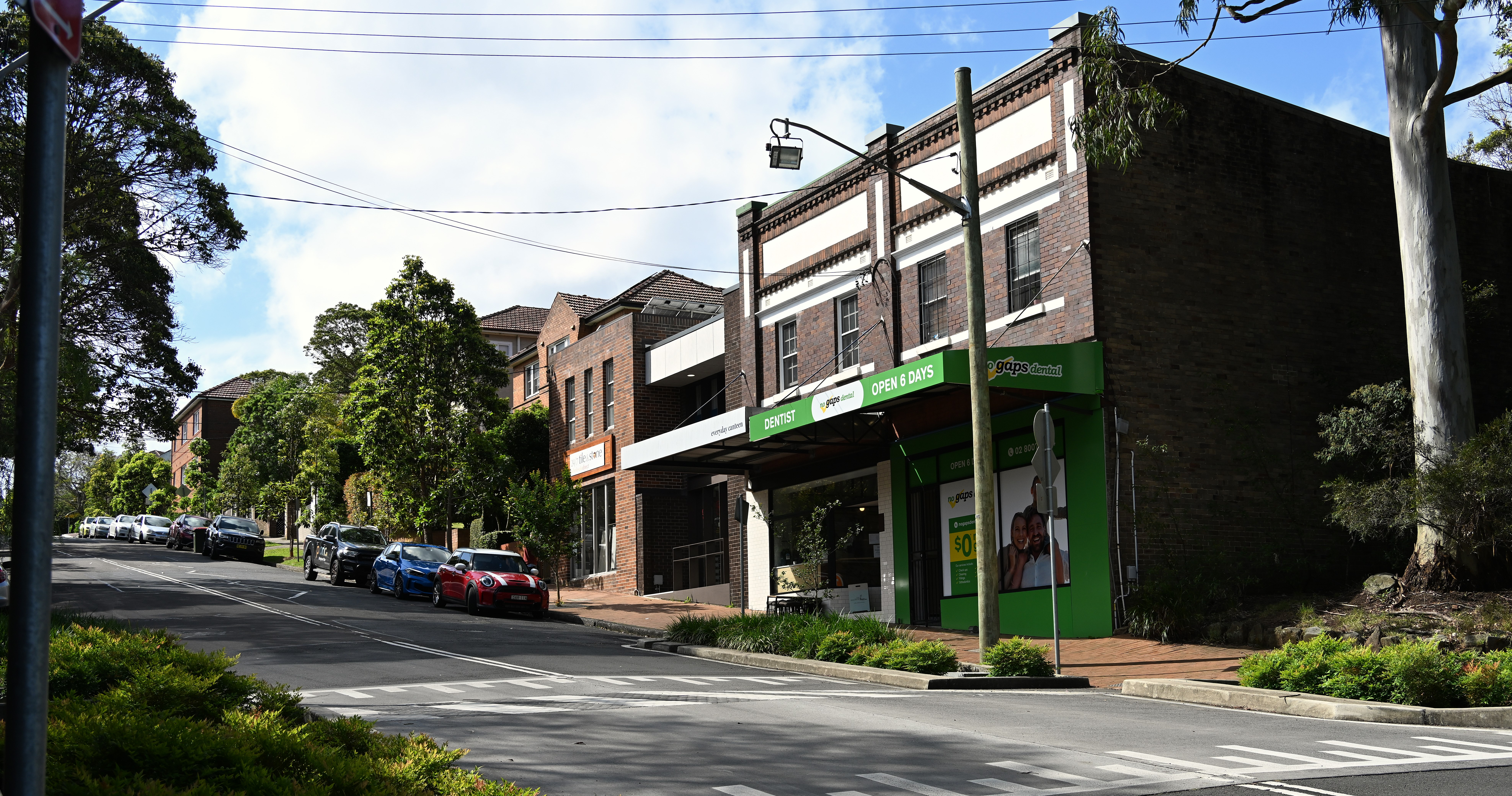
- Elizabeth Street

- Interactive map of Artarmon
- Country: Australia
- State: New South Wales
- City: Sydney
- LGA: City of Willoughby
- Location: 9 km (5.6 mi) north of Sydney CBD
- Established: 1794

Government
  - State electorate: Willoughby
  - Federal division: Bradfield

Area
  - Total: 2.5 km^{2} (0.97 sq mi)
- Elevation: 88 m (289 ft)

Population
  - Total: 9,417 (SAL 2021)
- Postcode: 2064
Suburbs around Artarmon
Lane Cove North	Chatswood	Willoughby
Lane Cove	Artarmon	Naremburn
Greenwich	St Leonards	St Leonards

Artarmon (/ɑːrtɑːrmən/) is a suburb on the lower North Shore of Sydney, in the state of New South Wales, Australia, 9 kilometres north-west of the Sydney central business district, in the local government area of the City of Willoughby.

== History ==
In 1794 and 1796, land grants were given to soldiers and emancipists to encourage farming. The most important farm was owned by William Gore (1765–1845), who was the provost marshal under NSW Governor William Bligh. Gore received a grant of 150 acres (0.61 km^{2}) in 1810, and named it Artarmon after his family estate in Ireland. Gore Hill is named after him.

The Chatswood South Uniting Church, located at the corner of Mowbray Road and the Pacific Highway, designed by architect and later mayor of Manly, Thomas Rowe, was built in 1871. A sandstone church in the Gothic style, it features a small belfry flanking the eastern front of the building. Immediately to the west is a small cemetery, with graves going back to 1871. The building was extended in 1883 and 1930; it is now listed on the (now-defunct) Register of the National Estate.

Artarmon Post Office opened on 1 December 1909. In 2025, it was reported that the Post Office was going to permanently close on 12 March, 2025.

== Heritage listings ==
Artarmon has a number of heritage-listed sites, including:

- 559 Pacific Highway: Chatswood Reservoirs No. 1 and No. 2

== Demographics ==
According to the 2021 census, 9,417 residents were in Artarmon; 46.8% of people were born in Australia. The next-most common countries of birth were China 10.3%, India 7.4%, Hong Kong 3.2%, England 3.0% and Japan 2.0%. About 50.6% of people only spoke English at home. Other languages spoken at home included Mandarin 12.4%, Cantonese 6.6%, Hindi 3.5%, Japanese 3.0% and Nepali 1.7%. The most common responses for religious affiliation were no religion 42.4%, Catholic 15.8%, and Anglican 8.8%. The median weekly household income for Artarmon was AU$2,420, significantly higher than the national median of $1,829.

== Commercial area ==
Artarmon has a mix of residential, commercial, and industrial areas. High-rise buildings are located to the west of the railway line, and houses are to the east. Also, an industrial area is south of the Gore Hill Freeway, although the suburb retains a rather leafy feel. A long row of shops is located beside the railway station on Hampden Road and several restaurants are in Wilkes Avenue on the eastern side of the station. Artarmon Public Library is one of the branch libraries in the City of Willoughby.

=== Media ===
The studios of the Special Broadcasting Service, a public television station, are located in Herbert Street. Until 2003, the Australian Broadcasting Corporation was located on the Pacific Highway, at Gore Hill. Fox Sports is headquartered on Broadcast Way near the Pacific Highway at Gore Hill. The Seven Network and Network 10 broadcast from a high transmission tower, operated by TXA in Hampden Road. The Nine Network had its studios in the adjacent suburb of Willoughby.

== Transport ==
Artarmon railway station is on the North Shore railway line of the Sydney Trains network. The Gore Hill Freeway meets the Pacific Highway at Artarmon. Buses to the Sydney CBD operate from the Pacific Highway. There are links to Chatswood via Mowbray Road and Pacific Highway, Northbridge and Willoughby via Artarmon Road, St Leonards via Hampden Rd and Lane Cove via Pacific Highway.

There is a shopping street on Hampden Road, between Jersey Road and Brand Street, which comprises various business, across the road from the Artarmon Railway Station.

== Schools ==
Artarmon Public School, opened in 1910, is a primary school serving the local community. It is the only school with 2 Opportunity Classes (OC). It was ranked 1st in 2018. Since then, the number of Opportunity Classes at Artarmon Public School is set to be reduced from 60 to 30 beginning in 2025.

== Notable residents ==
Photographer Max Dupain had his studio in Artarmon from 1971 until his death in 1992.

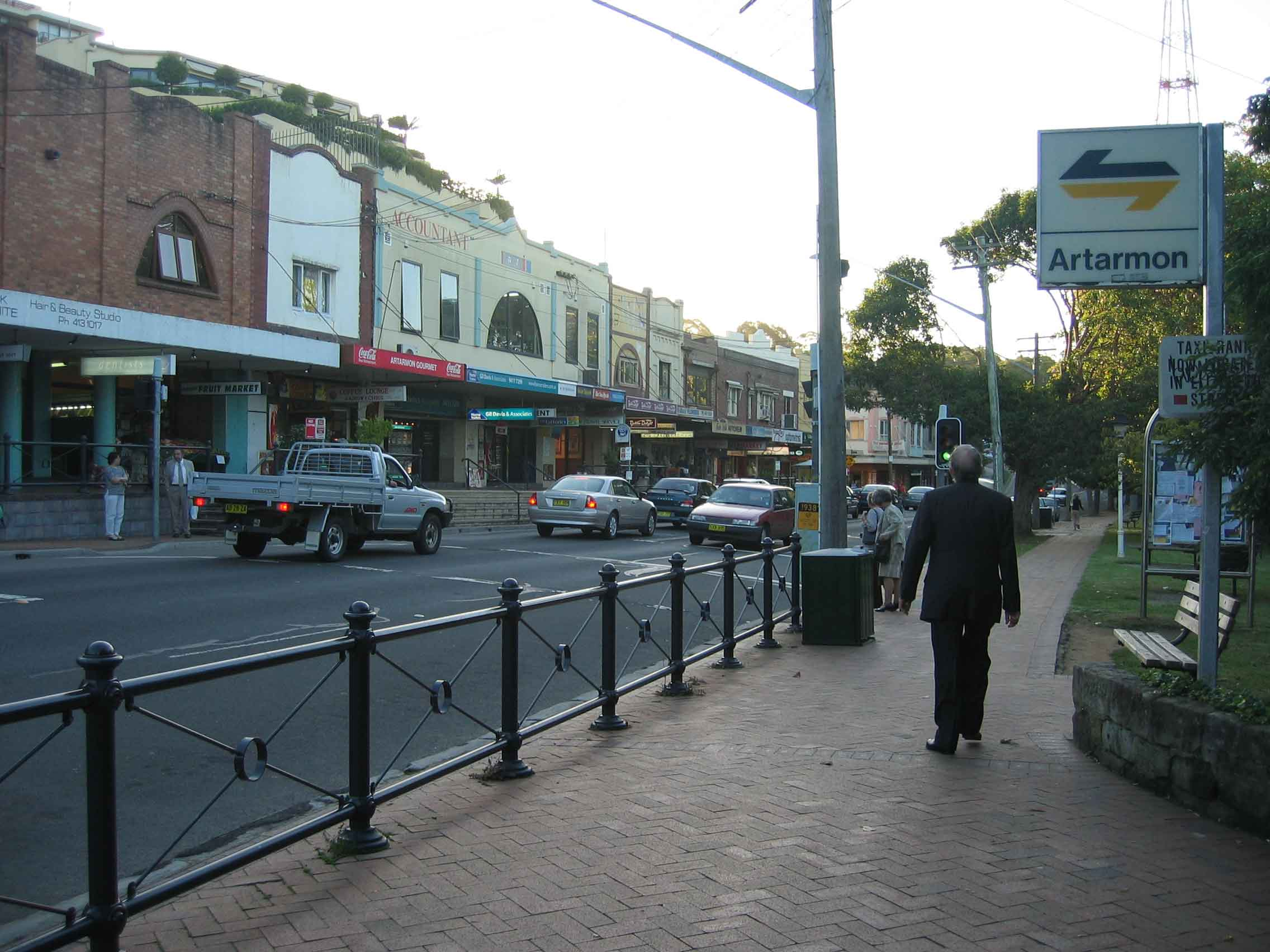
Hampden Road, facing north from the railway station

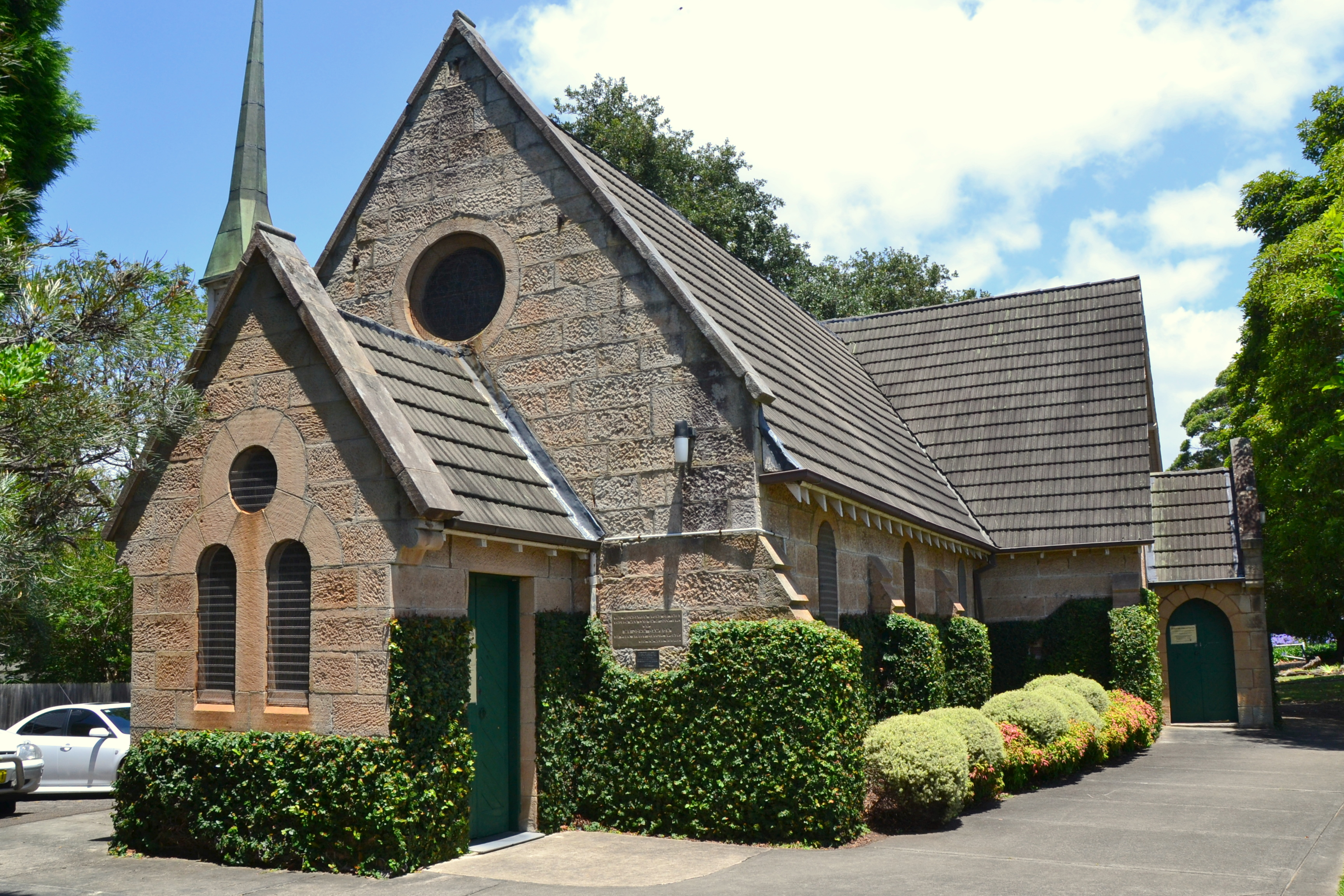
Heritage-listed Chatswood South Uniting Church

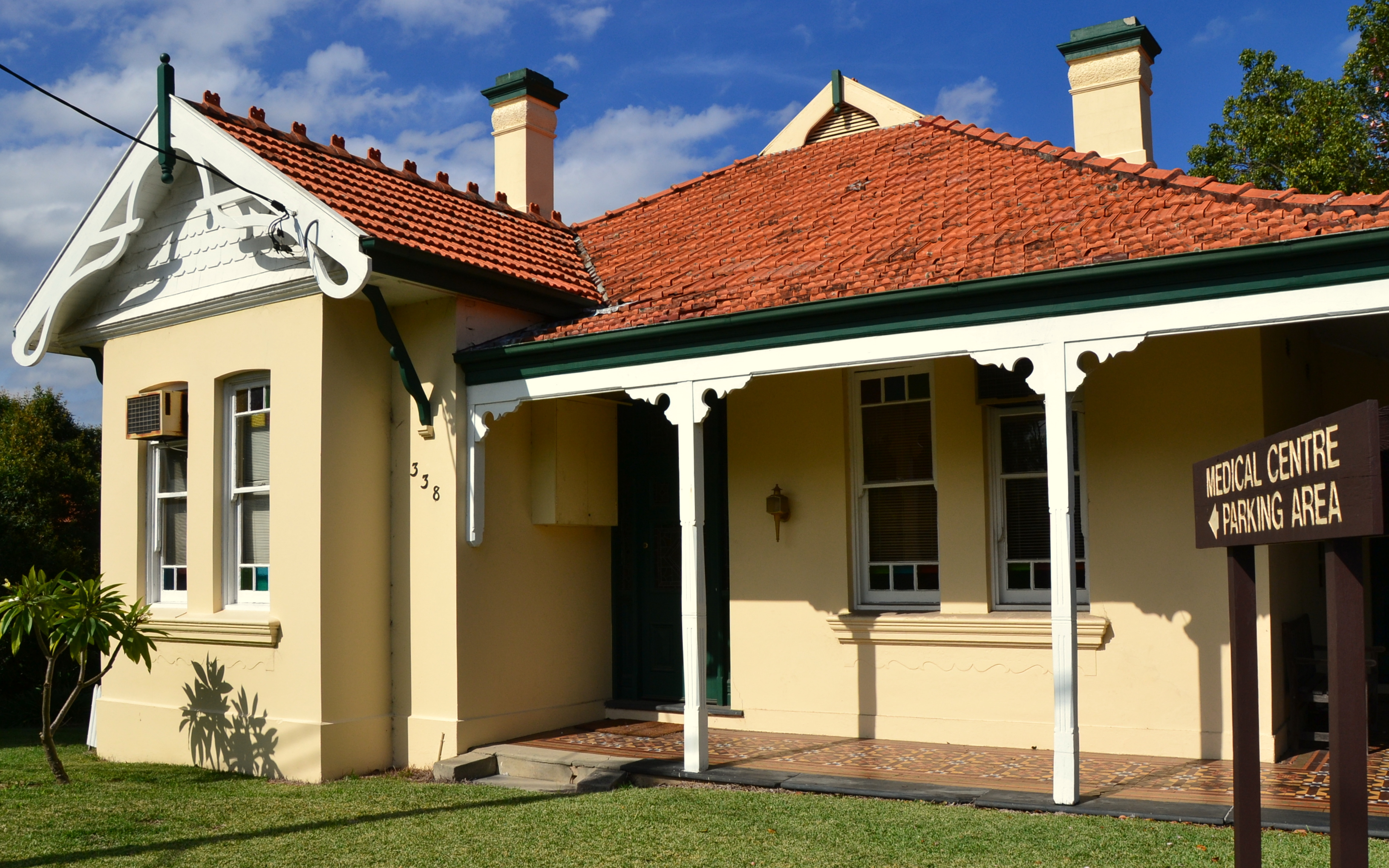
Federation cottage converted to medical centre, Mowbray Road

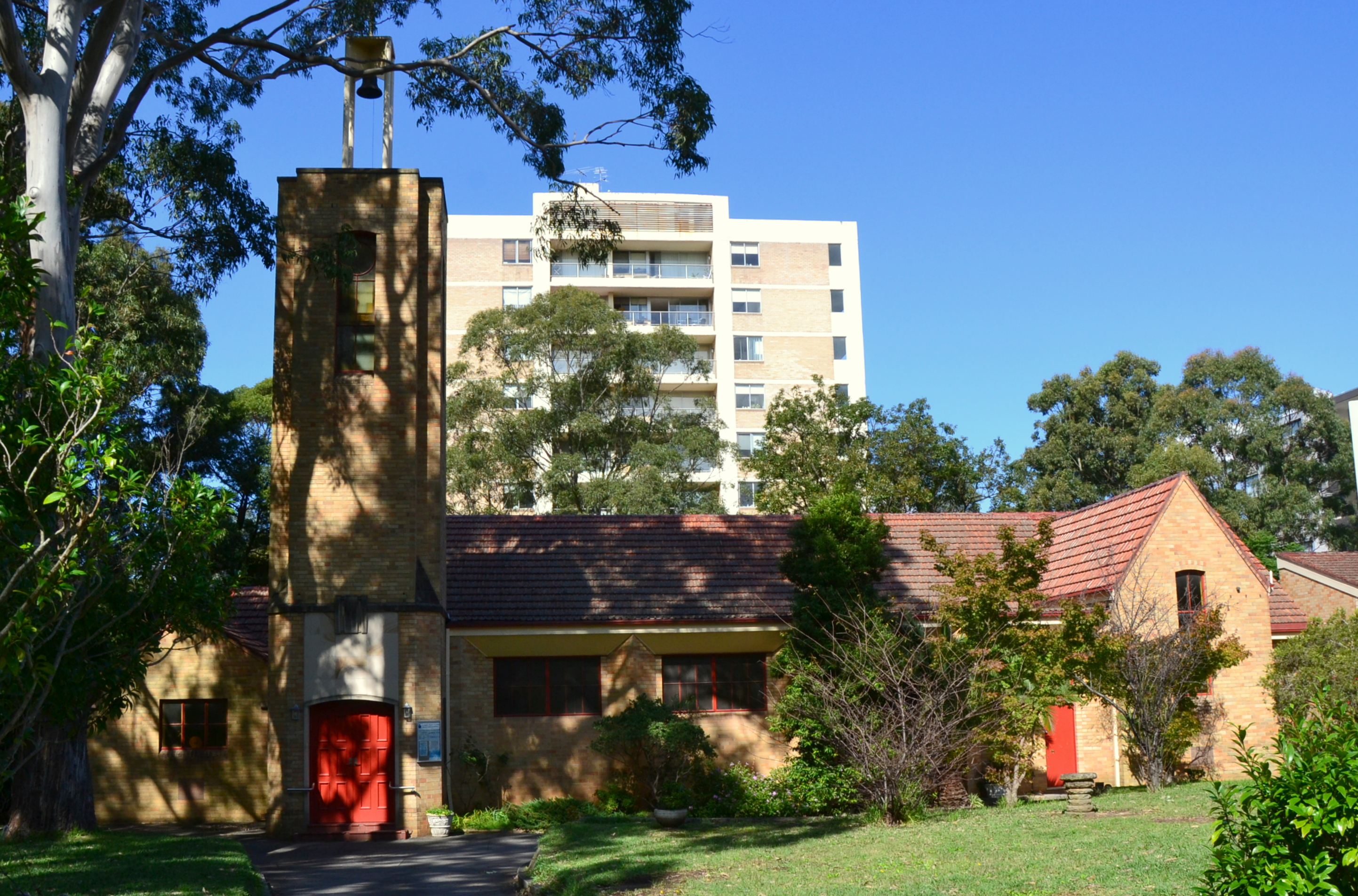
St Basil's Anglican Church, Broughton Road

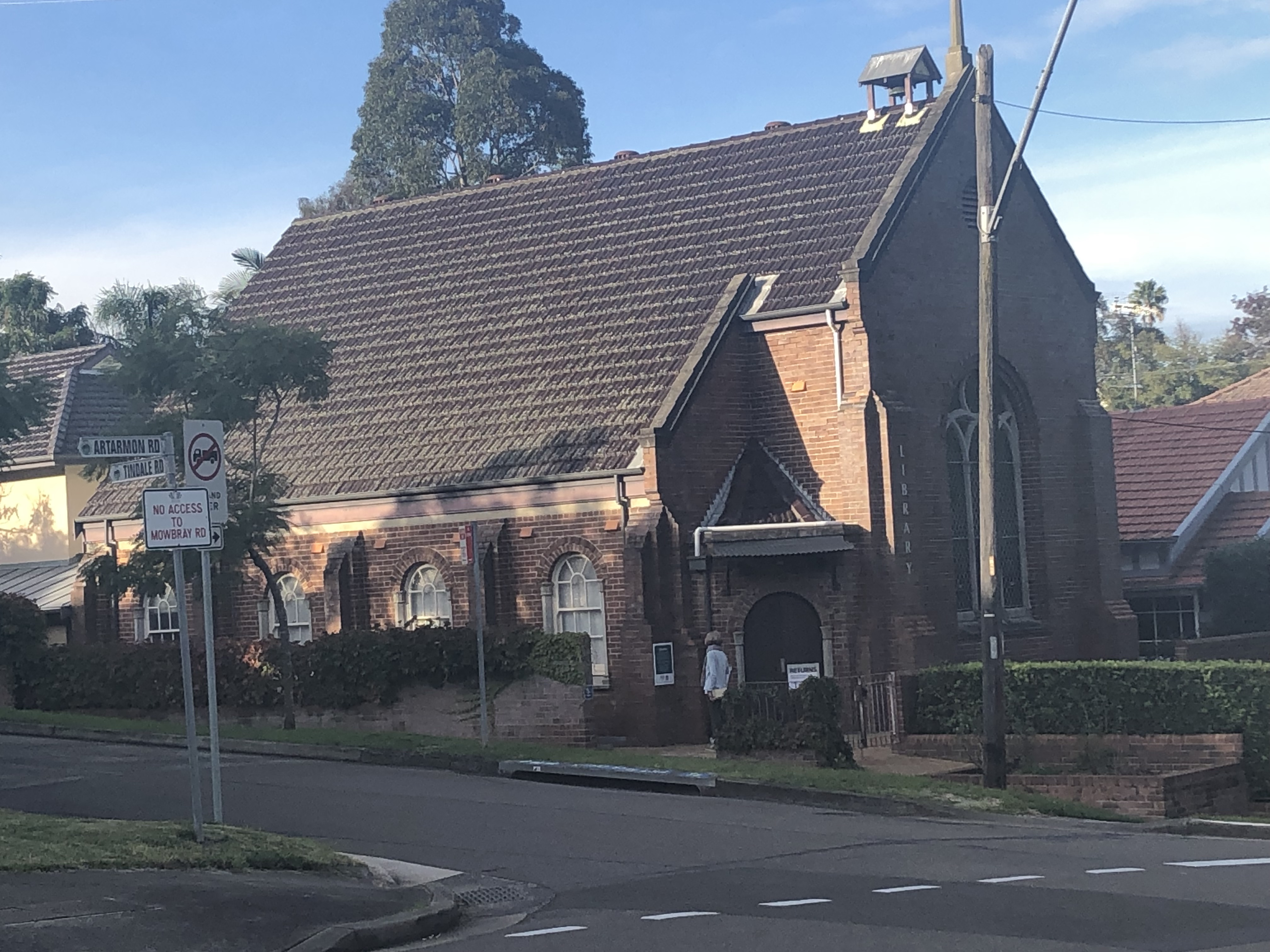
Artarmon Library
