= Gore Hill =

Locality in Sydney, New South Wales

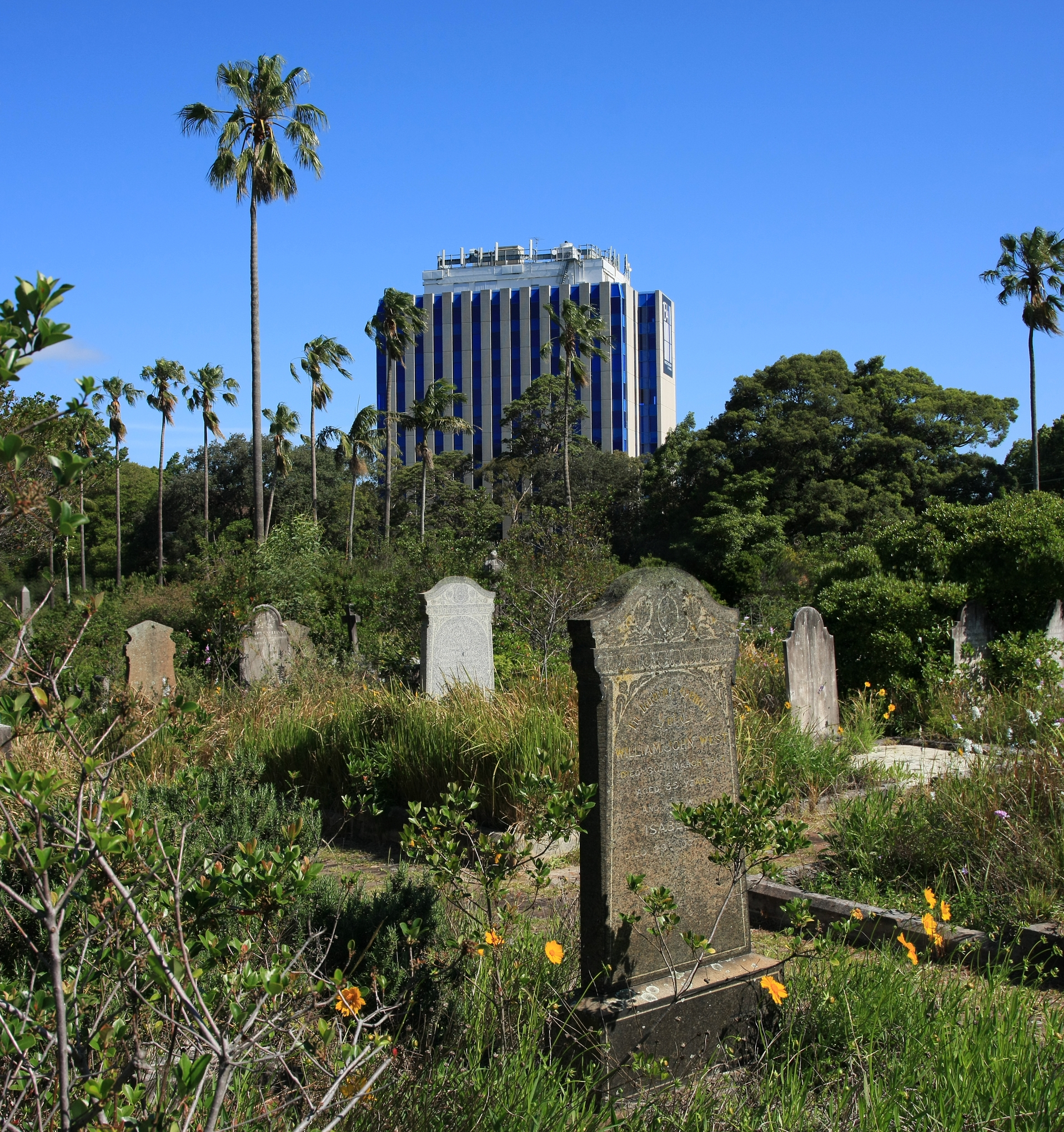
- Gore Hill Cemetery

- Coordinates: 33°49′04″S 151°11′07″E
- Country: Australia
- State: New South Wales
- City: Sydney
- LGA: City of Willoughby
- Location: 6 km (3.7 mi) north of Sydney CBD

Government
  - State electorate: Willoughby
  - Federal division: Bradfield
- Postcode: 2065
Localities around Gore Hill
| | Artarmon |
| Lane Cove; Osborne Park | Gore Hill | St Leonards |
| | Greenwich |

Gore Hill is an urban locality on the Lower North Shore of Sydney, New South Wales, Australia. Gore Hill is located within the southern part of the suburb of Artarmon, and the north-west of the suburb of St Leonards.

== History ==
It takes its name from William Gore, the provost marshal in colonial Sydney, who had a property of 61 hectares (150 acres) in the area.

It is best known for the Gore Hill Freeway that runs from Lane Cove to Naremburn and as the location of the ABC's Sydney television transmission tower, which is 170 m (558 ft) high. For more than 40 years Gore Hill was the location of the ABC's Sydney television studios which were established in 1956 and which operated until June 2003, when the site was closed and sold, and the ABC moved its television operations to its combined TV-radio studio facility in the inner-city suburb of Ultimo.

== Heritage listings ==
Gore Hill has a number of heritage-listed sites, including:

- Gore Hill Cemetery

== Industry ==
Fox Sports's headquarters have been on the Pacific Highway at Gore Hill since 2012. Foxtel also have facilities in the same building. In 2022, NextDC opened a facility on part of the former ABC site.

Channel 7 also had a transmission mast at Gore Hill but this was demolished in the early 1970s. Radio station 2UE's studios were located on the Pacific Highway until the 2010s.

Gore Hill is also home to Royal North Shore Hospital, historic Gore Hill Cemetery and Gore Hill Oval, home of the North Shore Bombers Australian Rules Football club.

== Brick and tile works ==
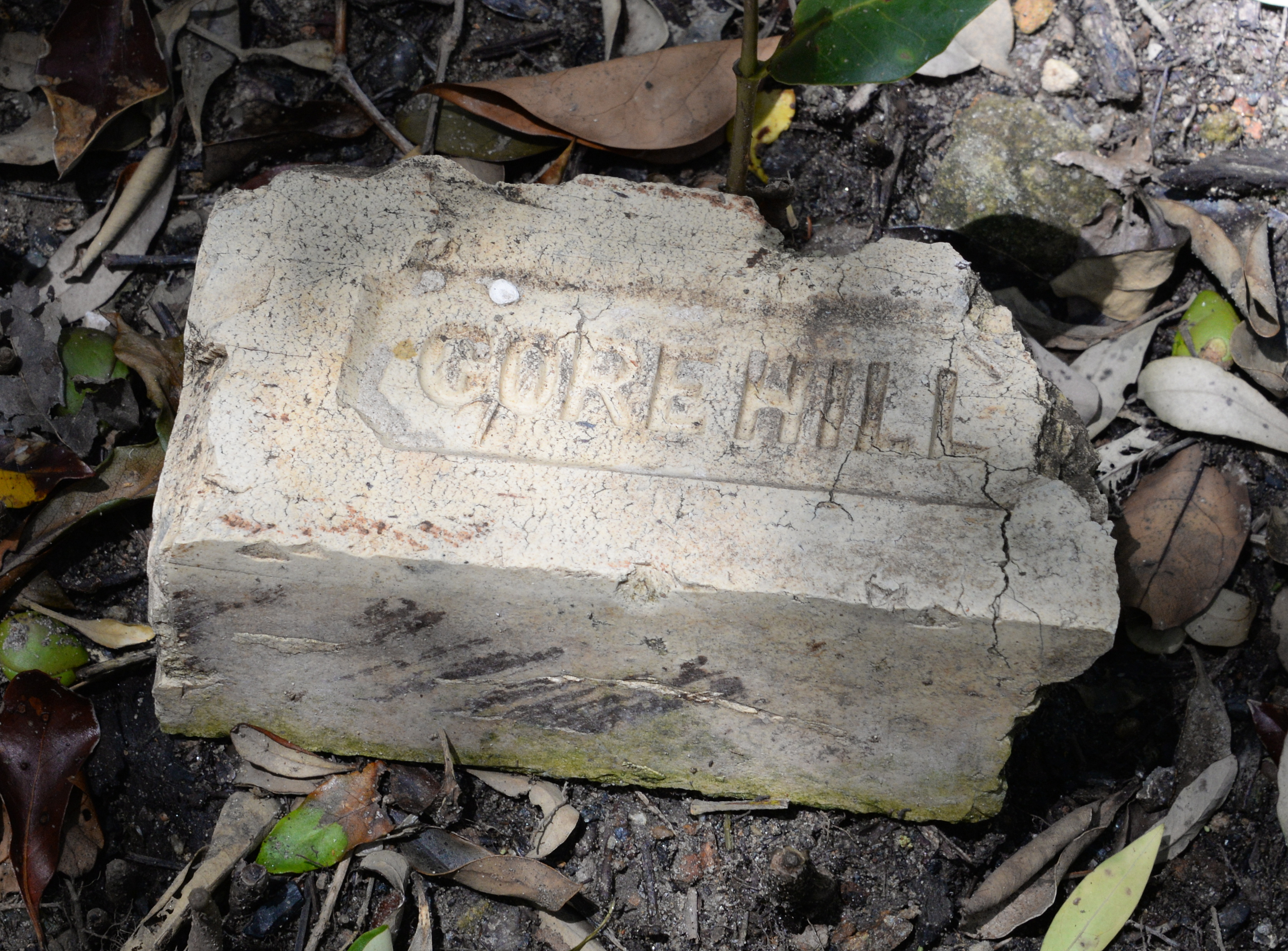
Gore Hill brick found at Buffalo Creek, Hunters Hill

Bricks were first made at Gore Hill in 1828 and continued until 1954. A siding was constructed from the North Shore railway line to a brickworks operated by the North Sydney Brick and Tile Company in 1902. Horses hauled open 4-wheel goods wagons over the line. Soon after 1910, the line was extended through a tunnel under Reserve Road. Though blocked from public access, this tunnel remains and forms part of Austcorp's Winevault complex.
