= Lane Cove =

- Suburb
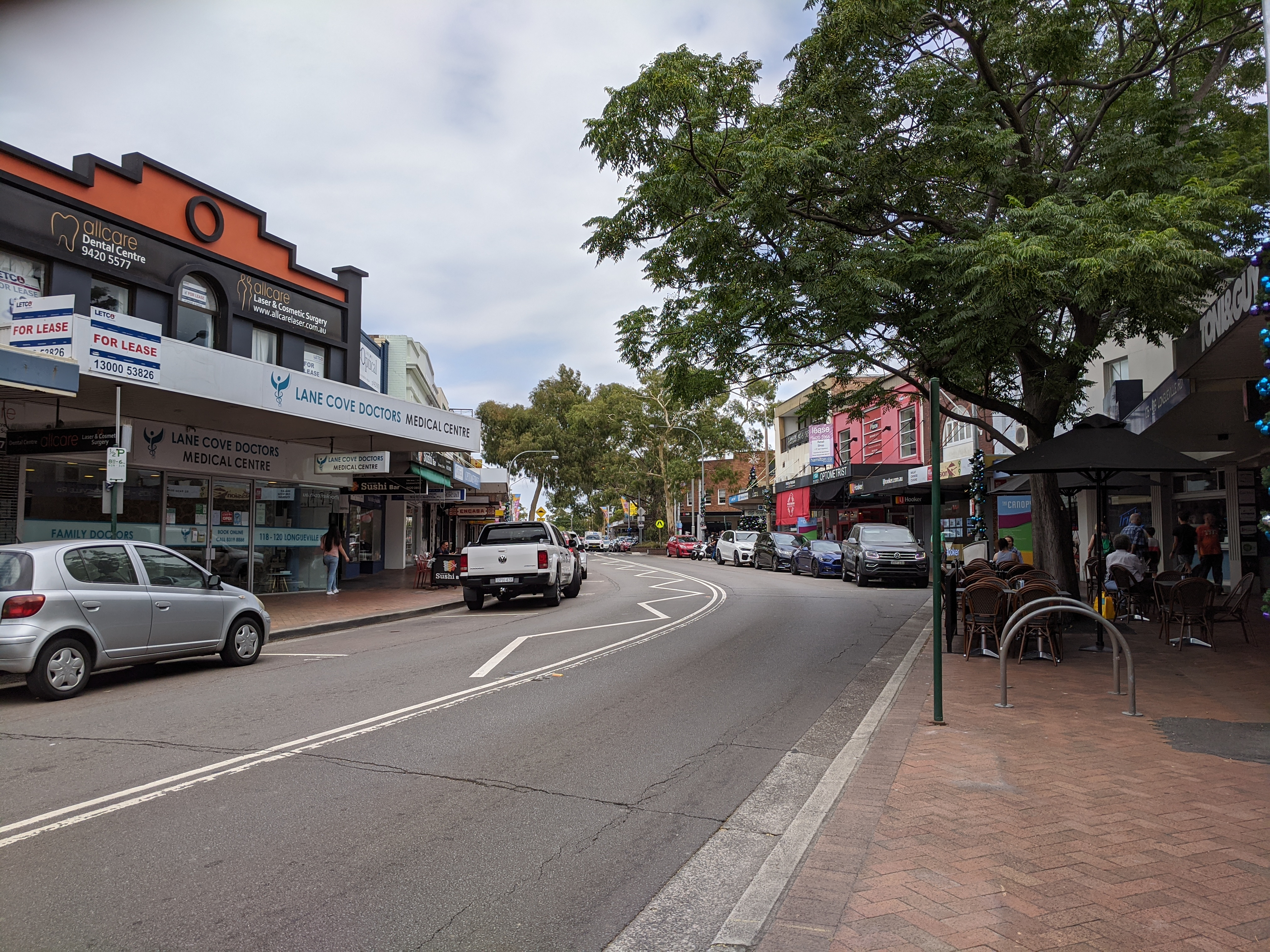
- Shopfronts on Longueville Road

- Interactive map of Lane Cove
- Country: Australia
- State: New South Wales
- City: Sydney
- LGA: Lane Cove Council
- Location: 9 km (5.6 mi) north-west of Sydney CBD

Government
  - State electorates: Lane Cove; Willoughby
  - Federal division: Bennelong

Area
  - Total: 2.5 km^{2} (0.97 sq mi)

Population
  - Total: 12,363 (SAL 2021)
- Postcode: 2066
Suburbs around Lane Cove
Lane Cove West	Lane Cove North	Artarmon
Linley Point	Lane Cove	Osborne Park Gore Hill
Riverview	Longueville	Northwood

Lane Cove is a suburb on the Lower North Shore of Sydney, New South Wales, Australia. Lane Cove is nine kilometres north-west of the Sydney central business district and is the administrative centre for the local government area of the Lane Cove Council. Lane Cove West and Lane Cove North are separate suburbs.

Lane Cove occupies a peninsula on the northern side of Port Jackson (Sydney Harbour), at the opening of the Lane Cove River. The regional administrative and shopping hub of Chatswood is located three kilometres away, along with Macquarie Park four kilometres away.

== History ==
Suburban area of Lane Cove

There are a number of possibilities of the origin of the name 'Lane Cove'. The first written use of the name was by Lieutenant William Bradley after he had just sailed along the river in 1788. Some have argued that it was named after Lieutenant Michael Lane, a respected cartographer, who had once worked with Captain Cook. Others say that it was in honour of John Lane, who was the son of the London Lord Mayor at the time as well as a good friend of the first Governor, Arthur Phillip. In any case, the name stuck, and by the 1800s was being used to refer to all the land north of the river.

=== Aboriginal culture ===
Prior to the arrival of the First Fleet, the area in which Lane Cove is situated was inhabited by the Cammeraygal people of the Ku-ring-gai Aboriginal Tribe. The group, which inhabited the north shore of Port Jackson, was one of the largest in the Sydney area.

=== European settlement ===
Lieutenant Ralph Clark was the first European to land, a short distance from the entrance to the Lane Cove River on 14 February 1790. There were land grants in 1794 to some privates and non-commissioned officers in the New South Wales Corps, although few of these grants were actually settled as the steep, timbered land was not particularly habitable. However, Lane Cove was an excellent source for timber and other commodities that the settlers required. One early settler named William Henry (1778–1862) was granted 1,000 acres in an area which now includes much Lane Cove National Park. The grant was never confirmed due to the Rum Rebellion and Henry was thrown off the land. It is suspected that John MacArthur had schemed to ensure that William Henry suffered because he had supported William Bligh during the rebellion. During the 19th century, farms and dairies were also established. There were also many industrial and manufacturing factories constructed around Greenwich. A detailed history of the early years of Lane Cove is found in Ball. John and Pam, Revisiting the early history of Lane Cove, 2010, Oughtershaw Press, ISBN 978-0-9593420-7-9. 253 pages.

Most of the residential growth in the area however occurred after World War II when returning soldiers were granted blocks of land around Lane Cove. The land value, which was relatively cheap during this time, surged during the 1980s and 1990s when the water views, large suburban blocks, ease of transport and quiet streets became popular.

From 1900 to 1979, St Joseph's Girls' Home operated on the Pacific Highway. About 3000 girls passed through it.

In 2005, Lane Cove briefly caught the attention of the world's press when part of an apartment block (which is now classified as being in the new suburb of Lane Cove North) collapsed into an excavation for the Lane Cove Tunnel and a pet bird in the evacuated block was rescued by a robot.

Lane Cove North was split off to become a separate suburb on 20 January 2006.

=== Former tram line ===
A tram service to Lane Cove opened as an electric line from Crows Nest in February 1900, with trams connecting with other electric services at Ridge Street. It was initially opened as far as Gore Hill and extended to Lane Cove in March, 1909. Some through services operated to and from Milsons Point.

In September 1909, a new line was opened from McMahons Point to Victoria Cross, North Sydney and a new direct route was opened via what is now the Pacific Highway from Victoria Cross to Crows Nest. Services to Lane Cove and Chatswood were altered to operate to and from McMahons Point via the new direct route to Crows Nest, in conjunction with the construction of the Sydney Harbour Bridge.

In March, 1932 the Sydney Harbour Bridge with its associated railway and tramway tracks was opened and services from Lane Cove to the CBD were diverted to operate to and from Wynyard station via the Sydney Harbour Bridge route. Trams entered Wynyard station via a tunnel entrance at the south-eastern pylon of the bridge.

From Lane Cove a cross regional service to Balmoral was also available. Upon departure from the Lane Cove terminus opposite the council chambers, trams travelled north on Longueville Road turning right onto the Pacific Highway. At Crows Nest, separate lines branched left onto Falcon Street, travelling through Cammeray, Neutral Bay, Cremorne Junction and Mosman before joining Military Road. The line then split into two separate lines at the intersection of Middle Head Road and Bradleys Head Road. Turning left into Gordon Street off Middle Head Road, the line then entered on to its own off-road reservation, crossing several small residential streets as it wound its way down to Henry Plunkett Reserve, entering The Esplanade near the corner of Botanic Road and terminating near Hunters Parade.

== Heritage listings ==
Lane Cove has a number of heritage-listed sites, including:

- 334 Burns Bay Road: Carisbrook, Lane Cove

== Commercial area ==
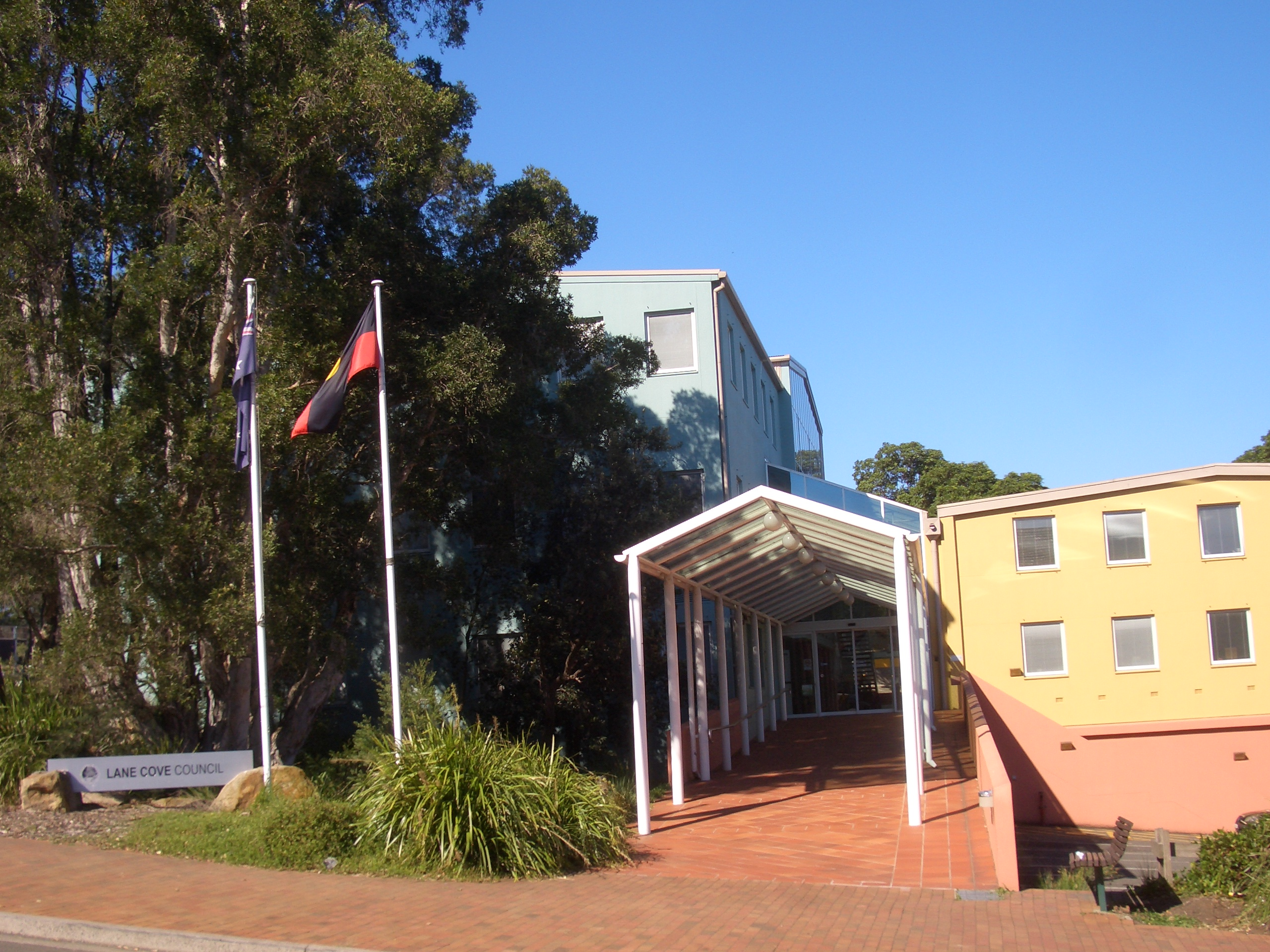
Lane Cove Town Hall

Although Lane Cove consists of mostly residential areas, it does contain some commercial and industrial ones as well.

Lane Cove has a shopping centre that includes a pedestrian plaza at the eastern end of Burns Bay Road, where it meets Longueville Road. There is a Coles supermarket, a Woolworths supermarket, a Harris Farm, a pub and a number of small specialty stores in this area, as well as a large number of restaurants and cafes. At the end of Longueville Road is the Lane Cove Businessman's Club which is the only local Club in the Area.

Several large businesses are located in Lane Cove including the Australian headquarters of statistical software company SAS, the recording house for Warner Bros., Festival Mushroom Records, as well as BlueScope's marketing branch in Lane Cove West.

=== Lane Cove Library ===
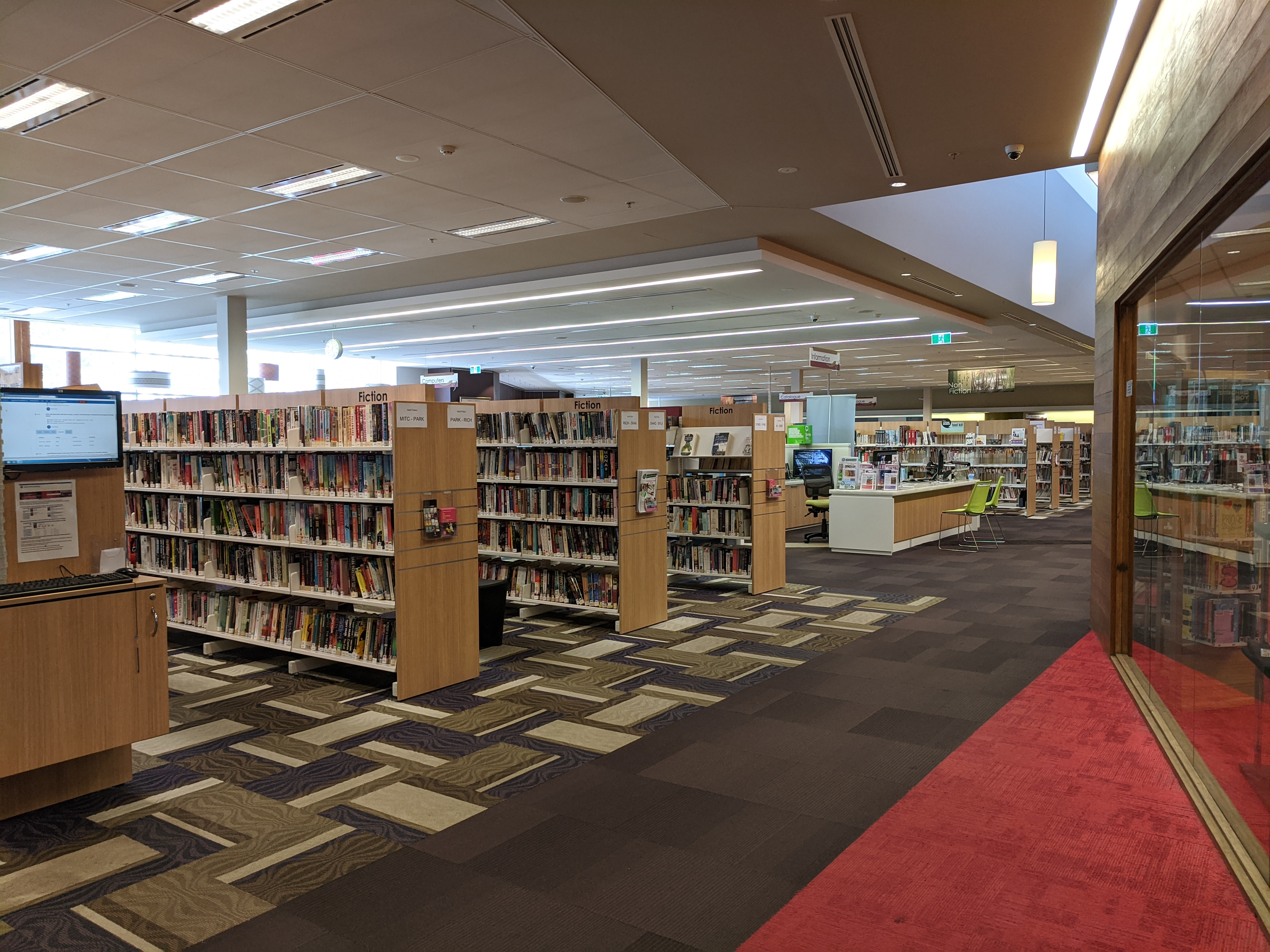
The interior of Lane Cove Library in 2020

Lane Cove Library is located at Library Walk, Lane Cove. The library received a major update with an extension/refurbishment which increased Library space from 1,203 sq m to 3,301 sq m - exceeding state benchmarks.

=== Greenwich Library ===
A small Branch Library is located at Greenwich.

=== Lane Cove Aquatic Leisure Centre ===
Lane Cove Aquatic Leisure Centre contains a 50-metre swimming pool, a 25-metre swimming pool, a shallow pool for toddlers and young children and a well-equipped gym. There are also water springs, a sauna, spa and a kiosk.

== Transport ==
The Gore Hill Freeway, which brings traffic from the city, the airport and southern suburbs connects to two major roads at Lane Cove - the Pacific Highway which travels north and Epping Road which goes north-west. The traffic problems at these intersections led to the construction of the Lane Cove Tunnel, which takes vehicles straight from the Gore Hill Expressway to the M2. Cars can now travel from the Baulkham Hills Shire to the airport without having to pass a single set of traffic lights (although there are tolls to pay in each direction). Since the opening of the Lane Cove Tunnel, two lanes of Epping Road between Mowbray Road and Lane Cove have been removed, with the left lane in each direction becoming a bus lane, reducing Epping Road in some sections to one lane in each direction for general traffic and increasing congestion. Getting in and out of Lane Cove can take 20 – 30 minutes in a car in peak hour.

Lane Cove was the terminus of one of Sydney's northern tram lines, which closed in the late 1950s. Trams operated to Wynyard in the city and Balmoral via Crows Nest. The current 254 bus route largely follows the city route from Longueville Road to Wynyard via Crows Nest and North Sydney. A new major bus interchange constructed at the intersection of Epping Road and Longueville Road, as part of the Lane Cove tunnel works, opened in March 2008 with approximately 25 separate bus routes (including school routes) operating from here.

Busways operates services to King Street Wharf, McMahons Point, Riverview, Gladesville, Epping and Macquarie Centre. CDC NSW operate services to Castle Hill, Rouse Hill and the Queen Victoria Building. Transit Systems NSW operate services to Chatswood and Westfield Burwood.

A cyclepath has been constructed along the southern edge of Epping Road from the Pacific Highway to the Lane Cove River. This cyclepath links to the Gore Hill Freeway Cyclepath. Connecting cyclepaths allow cyclists to journey to Chatswood, North Sydney, Willoughby and the Macquarie Park area.

A Captain Cook Cruises ferry service that travels someway down the Lane Cove River, stops at Longueville, Northwood and Greenwich.

The nearest train stations are about 3 kilometres away at Chatswood and Artarmon. According to the 2016 census, 22.7% of the population travelled to work by bus alone. Other methods of travel included by walking (3.9%) or via car as driver or passenger (48.9%). In 2021 during the second COVID lockdown in New South Wales this statistic included 56.4% of people that worked at home, 23.8 that drove to work either as a passenger or driving themselves, walking was at 3.2%, bus was at 2.9% and train and bus was at 0.6%.

== Education, culture and religion ==
Schools in Lane Cove are:

- Currambena School - an independent primary and preschool.
- Lane Cove Public School - a primary school, established in 1876, that educates around 800 students.
- St Michael's School - a Catholic primary school, originally run by the Sisters of Mercy, who began teaching there in 1922.
- Saint Ignatius' College, Riverview - a Jesuit high school for boys, founded in 1880.

Cultural groups and services include the Lane Cove Youth Orchestra, Lane Cove Concert Band, Lane Cove Art Society, Lane Cove Dance Academy, Lane Cove Music and Cultural Centre, Lane Cove Historical Society, Lane Cove Theatre Company and Lane Cove Bushland and Conservation Society. The Rio Theatre and cinema operated until sold in 1951.

It hosts one of four branches of The Sydney Library of Things

Annual festivals are the Lane Cove Autumn Harmony Festival and the Cameraygal Festival.

Places of worship in Lane Cove are:

- St Michael's Catholic Church
- St Andrew's Anglican Church
- Lane Cove Uniting Church
- The Christian City Church meets each Sunday In Longueville Rd
- Shinnyo-en Buddhist Temple

== Sports ==
The Lane Cove Aquatic Leisure Centre provides excellent facilities and is situated adjacent to Pottery Green Oval, which is used for cricket in summer and soccer and baseball in winter. For rugby league, Lane Cove is in the catchment area of the North Sydney Bears, officially the North Sydney District Rugby League Football Club, the only Sydney rugby league team without NRL representation to have a junior rugby league district. The local team is the Lane Cove Tigers. For rugby union, Lane Cove is in the catchment area of the Gordon Rugby Club. The local junior team is the Lane Cove Junior Rugby Club. There is also a senior team called the Lane Cove Rugby Club. These teams share Tantallon Oval in the Winter, whilst it is home to the Lane Cove Cricket Club in the Summer. The cricket club was established in 1893 and the Rugby Club in 1949. The Longueville Bowling Club, now known as the Longueville Sporting Club, has a lawn bowls green and is located close to the Lane Cove Country Club 9 hole golf course. Saint Ignatius' College, Riverview is an active participant in the Athletic Association of the Great Public Schools of New South Wales, and has fielded cricket and rugby sides in this sporting competition for over a century. It also hosts the historic Riverview Gold Cup Regatta on the Lane Cove River. The rowing race day began in 1882. Adult and junior skiff sailing races occur regularly at the Lane Cove 12ft Sailing Skiff Club.

Lane Cove also has Junior sporting clubs.

- Lane Cove Junior Rugby Union Club - U-5 to U-16
- Lane Cove Junior Rugby Club - Minis, U-10 to U-16
- Lane Cove Tigers Junior Rugby League Club
- Lane Cove Cats AFL Club - Auskick, U-9 to U-11
- Lane Cove Football Club - U-6 to U-18
- Lane Cove Cricket Club - U=9 to Seniors

== Parks ==
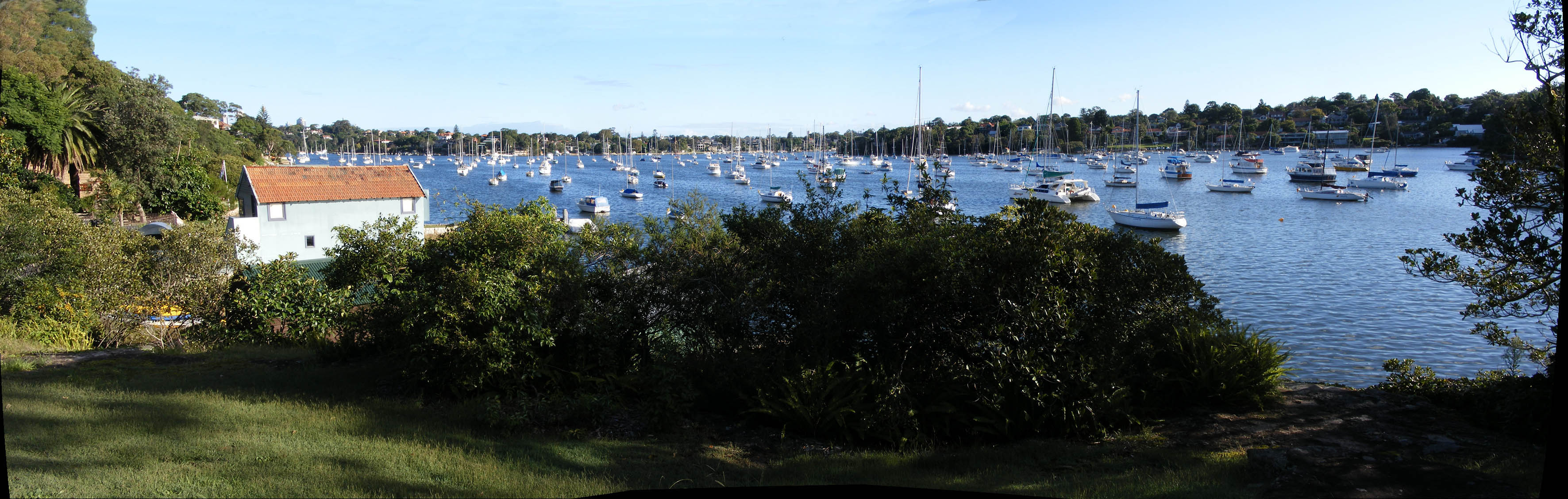
Woodford Bay, Lane Cove River

Around 16% of the area is devoted to public recreational areas including Burns Bay Park, Tambourine Bay Park, Pottery Green, Blackman Park and Tantallon Oval. As well as this there is a large amount of bushland surrounding the river's edge especially near Riverview and Lane Cove West. Lane Cove also has many small creeks and rivers that flow through it and therefore has many expanses of bushland. The Lane Cove River is the largest river in the area. Lane Cove National Park is located close to the suburb. The Lane Cove Bushland Park is home to an endangered species of fungus, Hygrocybe lanecovensis, which is found nowhere else. The species was discovered in the 1990s.

== Demographics ==
According to the 2021 census, the suburb of Lane Cove had a population of 12,363 people. Of these:

- Age distribution: The median age was 38 years, compared to the national median of 38 years. Children aged under 15 years made up 19.4% of the population (the national average was 18.2%) and people aged 65 years and over made up 15.1% of the population (national average is 17.2%).
- Ethnic diversity : 58.1% of people were born in Australia. The next most common countries of birth were China (excluding SARs and Taiwan) 5.6%, England 4.9%, India 2.7%, New Zealand 1.9% and South Africa 1.6%. 67.7% of people spoke only English at home. Other languages spoken at home included Mandarin 6.3%, Cantonese 3.2%, Spanish 1.4%, Korean 1.4% and Persian (excluding Dari) 1.4%.
- Religion : The most common responses for religion were No Religion 40.7%, Catholic 24.6%, Anglican 10.5 and Hinduism 3.2%.
- Finances: The median household weekly income was $2,539. This difference is also reflected in the high real estate prices, with the median mortgage payment in Lane Cove being $2,905 per month, compared to the national median of $1,863.
- Housing: 62.4% of dwellings in Lane Cove were flats or apartments, 30.3% were separate houses, and 7.0% were semi-detached (row or terrace houses, townhouses). The average household size was 2.4 people.

== Notable residents ==
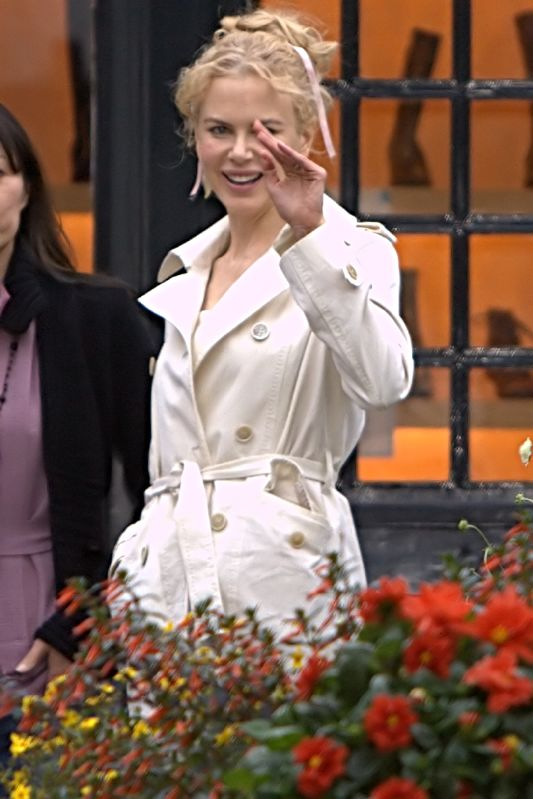
Nicole Kidman grew up in Longueville.

Musicians:

- Dr Judy Bailey OAM - 1935 - 2025 - Jazz Pianist / Composer / Arranger / Performer / Senior Lecturer at the Sydney Conservatorium of Music 1973 - 2021. Australia Council Don Banks Music Award 2022 / Also an article from In The Cove - Vale Dr Judy Bailey OAM

Writers

- Christopher Brennan, poet who boarded at Riverview
- Robert Dessaix's autobiography, A Mother's Disgrace, contains a memoir of growing up in Lane Cove in the 1950s.
- Robert Hughes, art critic. His memoir Things I Didn't Know discusses his high schooling as a boarder at St Ignatius' College, Riverview.

Artists

- Lloyd Rees, notable landscape artist
- Brett Whiteley, artist and twice winner of the Archibald Prize

Politicians

- Billy Hughes, later Prime Minister, built 'Osborne Park' (later called 'Kermadec') in Osborne Rd in 1906
- Barnaby Joyce, former Deputy Prime Minister of Australia; boarded at Riverview

Sportspeople

- Frank Hyde, Australian rugby league player. Was forced to switch club from Balmain to North Sydney after being discovered to be living in Lane Cove due to then residency rules.
- Brett Lee, Australian cricketer and Bollywood star. Lived in Lane Cove for a time, leaving in 2013.
- Sam Newman, Australian rules football player and television presenter

Entertainers

- Natarsha Belling, journalist
- Smoky Dawson, actor, singer, television, film and radio star
- Michael Hutchence, vocalist of INXS (1960–1997)
- Nicole Kidman, actress

== In popular culture ==
In 2009, the shopping centre on Longueville Road was used in the filming of Underbelly: The Golden Mile depicting Darlinghurst Road, Kings Cross.
