= Longueville Motor Bus Company =

Australian bus company

- Parent: George Newman
- Commenced operation: 23 October 1922
- Ceased operation: 29 June 1968
- Headquarters: Blaxlands Corner
- Service area: Lower North Shore, Sydney
- Service type: Bus services
- Routes: 2
- Depots: 1
- Fleet: 4 (June 1968)

Longueville Motor Bus Company was an Australian bus company operating route bus services on Sydney's Lower North Shore.

== History ==
On 23 October 1922, George Newman commenced operating a service from Longueville wharf to the corner of the Pacific Highway and Epping Road at Lane Cove. On 23 July 1923, the route was extended to Chatswood station.

On 14 January 1924, another service commenced from Tambourine Bay to Milsons Point wharf via Lane Cove and the Pacific Highway. This service ceased on 31 December 1926, the day before legislation required all buses be fitted with pneumatic tyres and transverse seating. With legislation likely to soom force services competing with trams to cease, Newman decided to concentrate his resources on the Longueville to Chatswood service which in 1927 was allocated the route number 127.

On 8 May 1927, Newman commenced operating route 95 Gladesville to Lane Cove that had previously been operated by White Transit Company. It was extended to Chatswood station on 16 January 1930. On 1 September 1927, the business was incorporated as Longueville Motor Bus Company (LMBC).

By 1929, the Harbour Bridge was at an advanced state of construction, but the State Government had decreed that buses and trams would be banned from using the bridge when it opened. On 17 May 1929, LMBC commenced operating an unauthorised service from Lane Cove to York Street in the Sydney CBD via the Five Bridges (Fig Tree, Gladesville, Iron Cove, Glebe Island and Pyrmont) route using luxury Fageol parlour coaches. Although well patronised, as an unauthorised service LMBC incurred fines on a daily basis and these made the service unprofitable. The service ceased on or about 31 August 1929.

Following Sydney Ferries Limited withdrawing off-peak Lane Cove River services, on 2 September 1946 LMBC filled the void with a ferry chartered from Stannard Brothers. However it was not viable and ceased at the end of the initial three-month trial. On 23 December 1946, LMBC began operating an off-peak service from Longueville to Wynyard. Neighbouring operator JH Hales commenced a similar service from Northwood on the same date, both services sharing a common route via River Road. Following Sydney Ferries Limited withdrawing its remaining services, the service was extended to operate in peak hours on 13 November 1950.

On 8 July 1955, route 95 was sold to Hunters Hill Bus Company who had operated in competition with LMBC between Gladesville and Fig Tree, and from 1948 between Lane Cove and Chatswood station. On 29 June 1968, Newman's widow sold the business to Deanes Coaches.

== Routes ==
The routes at the time the business was sold were:

- 127: Longueville – Chatswood station
- 127: Longueville – Wynyard station

== Fleet ==
At the time of the sale to Deanes Coaches, the fleet comprised three Daimlers and one Bedford OB.

== Depot ==
The depot was originally at the rear of Newman's house in Dunois Street, Longueville. In the late 1930s, a two-level fully covered depot was built at Blaxlands Corner. After being vacated by Deanes Coaches, it was converted into office space before being demolished in 2021.
