= North & Western Bus Lines =

Defunct Australian bus operator

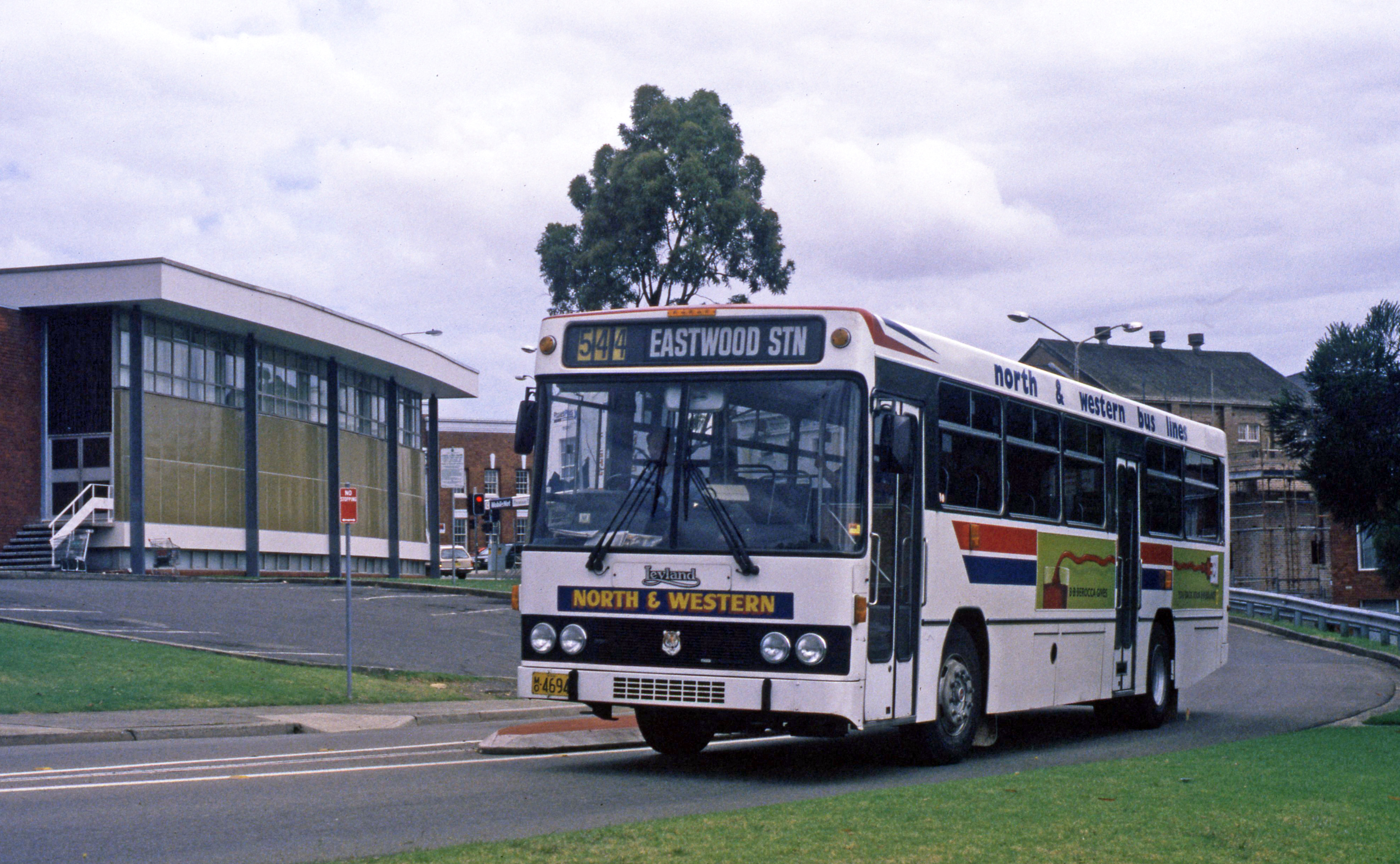
- A Leyland Tiger bearing the North & Western Bus Lines livery in December 1999, shortly after its sale to State Transit
- Parent: Ken Butt
- Ceased operation: 13 December 1999
- Headquarters: Gladesville
- Service area: Northern & Western Sydney
- Service type: Bus services
- Alliance: Parramatta-Ryde Bus Service
- Routes: 18
- Hubs: Chatswood station Parramatta station
- Depots: 1
- Fleet: 96 (December 1999)

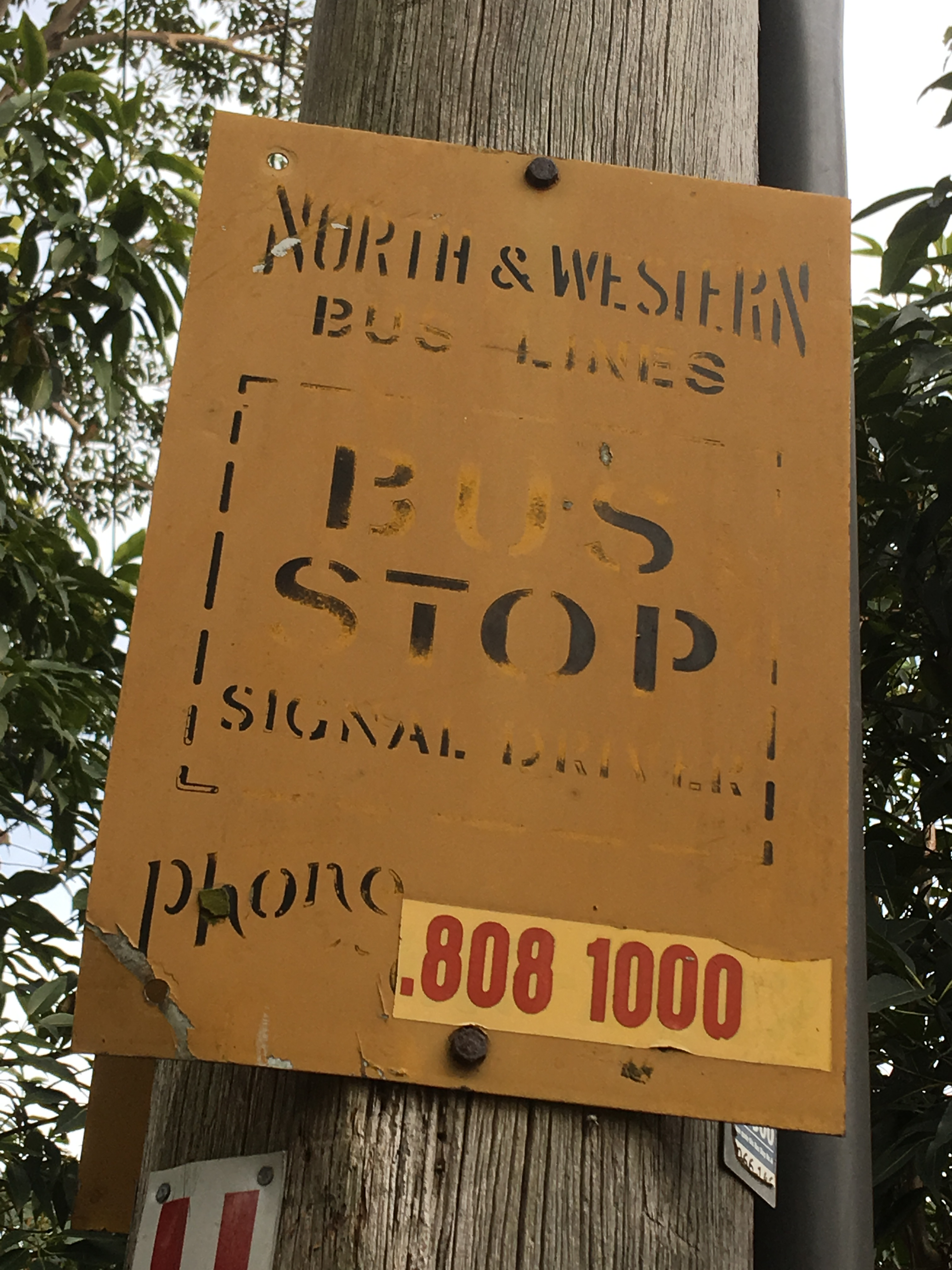
Remnant bus stop sign belonging to North & Western Bus Lines at Lane Cove North, September 2019

North & Western Bus Lines was an Australian bus company operating route bus services and charter coaches in Sydney.

== History ==
The origins of North & Western Bus Lines can be traced back to the late 1920s when Richard Smith formed Hunters Hill Bus Company (HHBC) purchasing route 234 Gladesville to Woolwich wharf service from Walter Bruce. In 1941, the business was sold to John A Gilbert.

In December 1945, route 99 Crows Nest to Greenwich wharf was purchased from Ernie Holley, followed in 1948 by route 75 Gladesville to North Ryde and 205 Ryde to Northern Suburbs Cemetery from Fred Rohr and route 53 Riverview to Chatswood station from Bill Nott. Also in 1948, HHBC commenced operating route 126 Gladesville to Ryde.

In July 1955, route 95 Chatswood station to Gladesville was purchased from Longueville Motor Bus Company, followed in June 1957 by route 85 Eastwood to Midway. Also in 1957, HHBC commenced operating route 141 Ryde to Macquarie Park, followed in November 1963 by route 228 Ryde to Eastwood and in January 1967 by route 43 Chatswood station to Ryde. In September 1973, route 128 Chatswood to Mowbray Road was purchased.

In April 1978, Ken Butt, who had managed the operation for 13 years, purchased HHBC and renamed the operation North & Western Bus Lines. In August 1981, the Eastwood and Epping services of the Cumberland Group were purchased and the operation rebranded as Metro West Bus Lines. The Metro West operations were later incorporated into North & Western in June 1992.

The routes acquired were:

- 86: Parramatta station – Eastwood
- 87: Eastwood – West Ryde
- 150: Eastwood – Carlingford
- 152: Gladesville – Meadowbank
- 163: Epping – North Epping
- 172: Parramatta station – Eastwood

In June 1986, routes 54 Chatswood station to Macquarie University and 89 Ryde to Epping via Eastwood were purchased from Deanes Coaches. In August 1989, routes 261 Lane Cove – Wynyard and 264 Northwood – Chatswood station were purchased from Harbour City Coaches.

In January 1995, a new depot was opened next to the State Transit Authority's Ryde depot with the three depots at Gladesville, Meadowbank and Rydalmere consolidated.

In November 1999, terms to sell the business were agreed with Connex, having beaten the State Transit Authority and National Express/Westbus. However, after several postponements of the handover date, it was announced that the business had been purchased by the State Transit Authority in December 1999. This was driven by a political desire to introduce State Transit's cheaper fares to several marginal electorates.

== Routes ==
The routes at the time the business was sold were:

- 261: Lane Cove – Queen Victoria Building
- 264: West Ryde station – Queen Victoria Building via Lane Cove
- 531: Ryde – Macquarie Centre
- 532: Chatswood station – Riverview
- 533: West Ryde station – Macquarie Centre
- 534: Chatswood station – West Ryde station
- 536: Chatswood station – Meadowbank
- 538: Woolwich wharf – Gladesville
- 539: Gladesville – Macquarie University
- 541: Eastwood – Epping
- 542: West Ryde – Eastwood
- 543: Eastwood – Carlingford
- 544: Eastwood – Ryde
- 545: Parramatta station – Ryde via Eastwood
- 546: Parramatta station – Bettington Road Loop Oatlands
- 547: Epping – North Epping
- 550: Chatswood station – Parramatta station
- 551: Chatswood station – Epping

Many of these routes were modified or replaced by new State Transit routes during bus network restructures in 2000 and 2001.

Two school routes operated during the 1980's were:

- 75: North Ryde – Gladesville
- 205: North Ryde – West Ryde Station

== Fleet ==
North & Western Bus Lines operated 94 buses and two coaches at the time of its sale. Hunter Hill Bus Company was painted in a livery of red lower panels with cream upper panels. North & Western Bus Lines adopted a white with red and blue stripes livery.
