= Blaxlands Corner =

- Coordinates: 33.8233°S 151.1720°E
- Country: Australia
- State: New South Wales
- City: Sydney
- LGA: Municipality of Lane Cove
- Location: 9 km (5.6 mi) north-west of Sydney CBD

Government
  - State electorate: Lane Cove
  - Federal division: North Sydney
- Postcode: 2066
Localities around Blaxlands Corner
| Lane Cove | Lane Cove | Lane Cove |
| Riverview | Blaxlands Corner | Osborne Park |
| Riverview | Longueville | Northwood |

Blaxlands Corner is a locality on the North Shore of Sydney in the state of New South Wales, Australia. Blaxlands Corner is at the intersection of Longueville Road, Northwood Road, and River Road West, in the southern part of Lane Cove adjacent to Longueville. It contains the Longueville Sporting Club, a BP service station, a bottle shop, a travel and cruise agency. Longueville Motor Bus Company built a depot at 16 Northwood Road in 1939 that was closed by successor Deanes Coaches in the mid-1970s.

It was named after Francis Blaxland who owned three acres of land in the area from the 1880s and was a grandson of Gregory Blaxland. It was recognised by the Geographical Names Board of New South Wales as a locality in 1995.
