= Deanes Coaches =

Company operating bus and coach services on Sydney's North Shore

- Parent: Ron Deane
- Commenced operation: August 1955
- Ceased operation: January 1989
- Headquarters: Macquarie Park
- Service area: North Shore
- Service type: Bus & coach services
- Alliance: Clipper Tours
- Depots: 1
- Fleet: 31 (December 1988)

Deanes Coaches was an Australian bus company operating route bus services and charter coaches on Sydney's North Shore.

== History ==
Deanes Coaches was formed in August 1955 as Turramurra-Bobbin Head Bus Service when Ron Deane purchase route 166 Turramurra station to South Turramurra from Turramurra Hire Service. On 1 July 1968, Longueville Motor Bus Company was purchased with route 127 Longueville to Chatswood station and Longueville to Wynyard. In November 1970, Barnes Coaches was purchased with routes 54 Chatswood station to Macquarie University, 124 Chatswood to Lindfield, 221 Lindfield to Bradfield Park and 224 Tambourine Bay to Wynyard via Northwood. In July 1973, route 89 Epping to Ryde was purchased from Eastwood Bus Company.

In May 1977, a new depot was opened in Macquarie Park to replace the Carlingford and Turramurra facilities. Routes 54, 124 and 221 were also transferred here from Lane Cove allowing the Blaxlands Corner depot to close. In December 1977, the Longueville and Northwood services were sold to Bernie Best as Lane Cove Bus Service with eight buses. In June 1986, routes 54 and 89 were sold to North & Western Bus Lines.

In December 1988, routes 564 and 565 were sold to East Lindfield – Killara Bus Service with six buses and the remainder of the routes sold to Hornsby Bus Group in January 1989 with 21 buses and four coaches.

== Other interests ==
The Deane family have for many years operated ski lodges in the Snowy Mountains with Deane's buses sometimes transferred here in the ski season.

From October 1964 until October 1985, Ron Deane also owned Clipper Tours which operated out of a depot that adjoined Deanes premises. Shortly before the sale of Deanes Coaches, in August 1988, Ron Deane purchased Menai Bus Service with six buses transferred from Macquarie Park.

=== Name revival ===
The Deanes Coaches name was revived by Ron Deane's sons Matthew and Brenton, who operated Forster Bus Service between January 1999 and October 2015, when the business was sold to the Buslines Group.

== Routes ==
The routes at the time the business was sold were:

- 564: Chatswood station – Lindfield via University of Technology
- 565: Lindfield – West Lindfield – Macquarie University
- 567: Gordon station – West Gordon
- 568: Gordon – West Pymble – Macquarie University
- 569: Pymble – Macquarie University
- 570: Turramurra station – South Turramurra via Kissing Point Road
- 571: Turramurra station – South Turramurra via Carina Road
- 572: Turramurra station – Macquarie University via Kissing Point Road
- 573: Turramurra station – Warrawee Valley – Fox Valley
- 574: Warrawee – Fox Valley
- 575: Turramurra station – East Wahroonga – North Wahroonga – Wahroonga
- 576: Turramurra station – East Wahroonga – North Turramurra – Turramurra loop
- 577: Turramurra station – North Turramurra – Bobbin Head
- 578: Turramurra station – Pymble via Bannockburn Road
- 579: Pymble – East Turramurra

== Fleet ==
Deanes Coaches operated 27 buses and four coaches at the time of its sale. Fleet livery was originally dark blue, followed by yellow and white with light blue stripes followed by white with blue orange and yellow stripes.
