= Linley House =

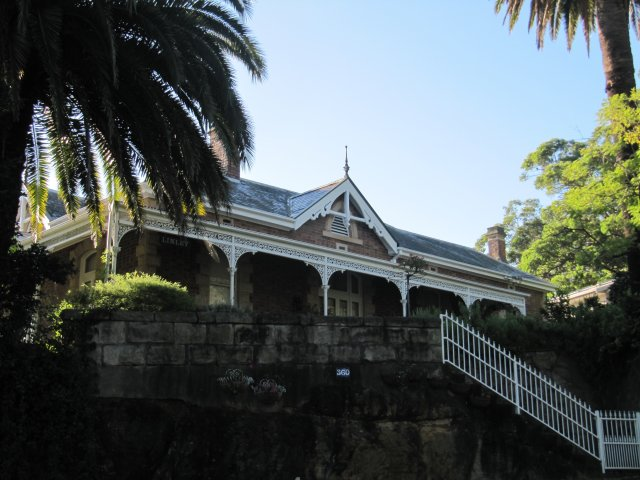

- Location within Sydney Location within Australia
- 33°49′31″S 151°09′03″E
- Location: 360 Burns Bay Road, Linley Point, Municipality of Lane Cove, New South Wales, Australia

New South Wales Heritage Register
- Official name: Linley House; Linley; Grenaby
- Type: State heritage (built)
- Designated: 2 April 1999
- Reference no.: 350
- Type: House
- Category: Residential buildings (private)

Linley House is a heritage-listed house located at 360 Burns Bay Road, Linley Point in the Lane Cove Council local government area of New South Wales, Australia. It is also known as Linley and Grenaby. The property is privately owned. It was added to the New South Wales State Heritage Register on 2 April 1999.

== Heritage listing ==
Linley was listed on the New South Wales State Heritage Register on 2 April 1999.

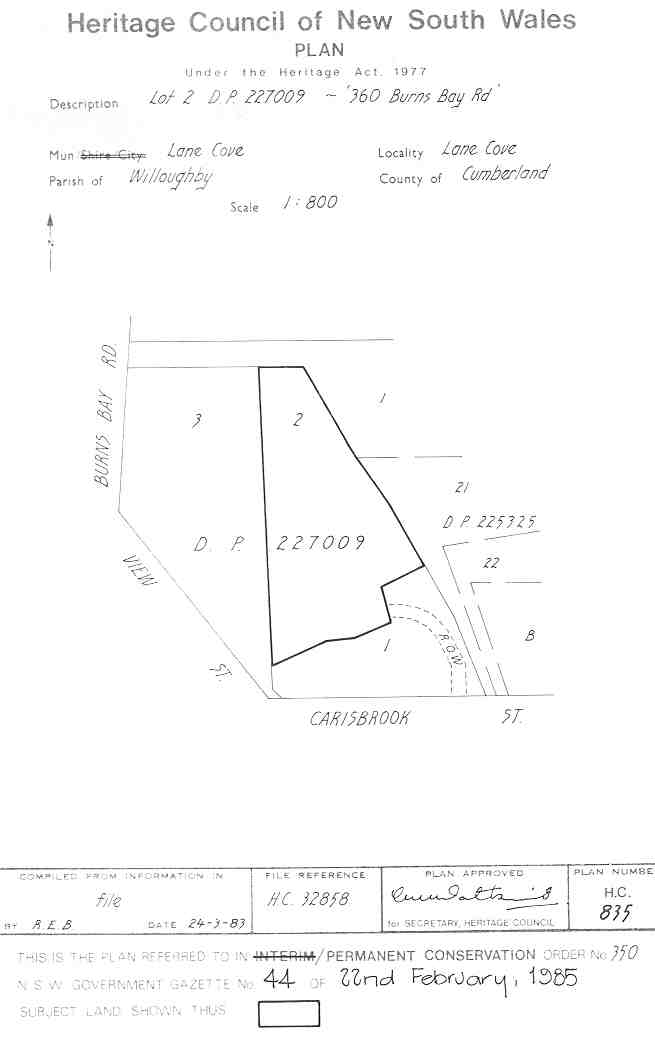
Heritage boundaries
