= Linley Point =

- Suburb
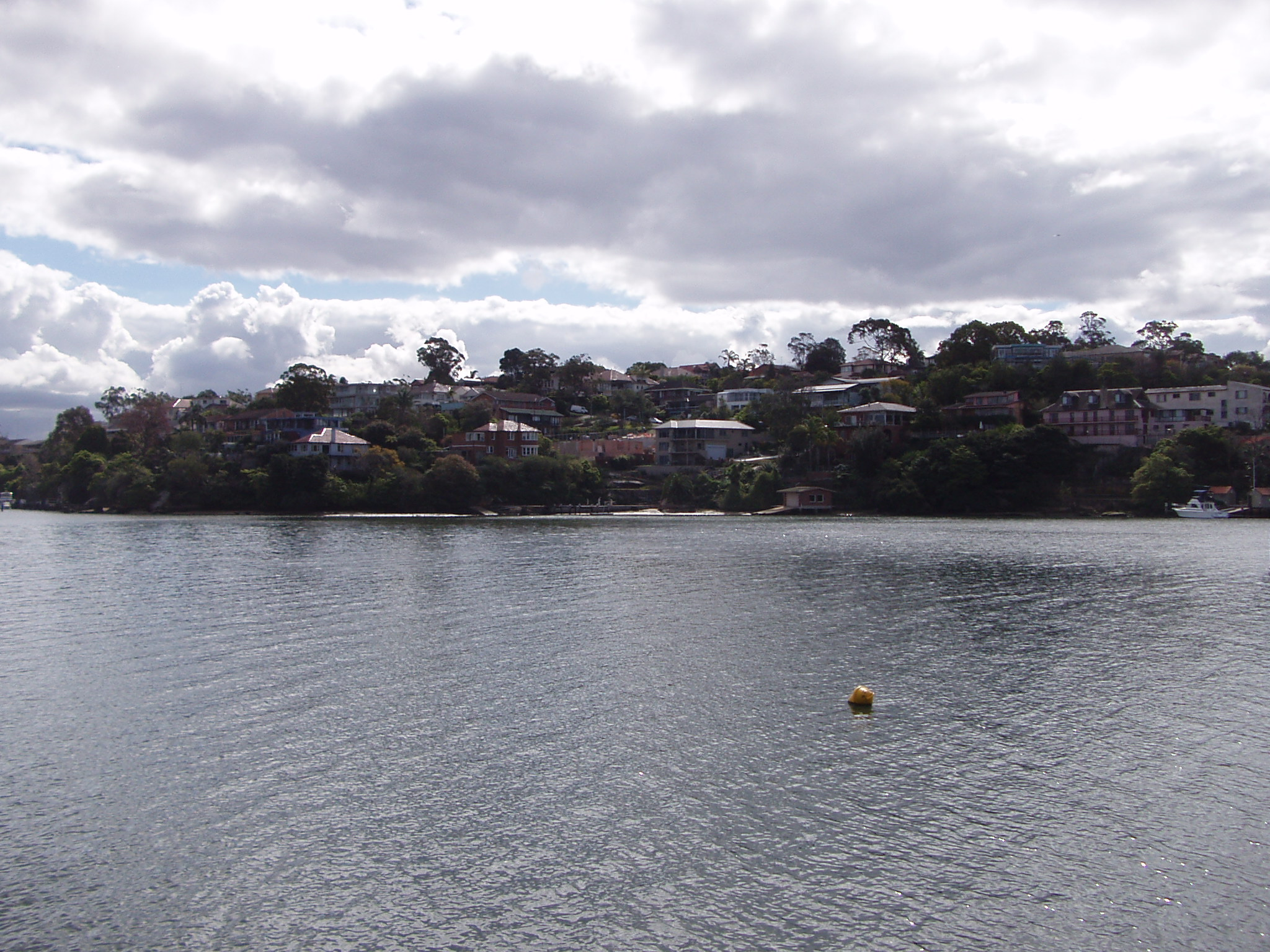
- Linley Point, view from Hunters Hill

- Interactive map of Linley Point
- Country: Australia
- State: New South Wales
- City: Sydney
- LGA: Municipality of Lane Cove
- Location: 10 km (6.2 mi) north-west of Sydney CBD

Government
  - State electorate: Lane Cove
  - Federal division: Bennelong

Population
  - Total: 382 (2021 census)
- Postcode: 2066
Suburbs around Linley Point
Lane Cove West	Lane Cove West	Riverview
Gladesville	Linley Point	Riverview
Hunters Hill	Hunters Hill	Hunters Hill

Linley Point is a small peninsular suburb located on the Lower North Shore of Sydney, in the local government area of the Municipality of Lane Cove, in the state of New South Wales, Australia. It is approximately 10 kilometres north-west of the Sydney central business district.

== Location ==
Linley Point is situated between the peninsula of Hunters Hill and Woolwich to the south, and Lane Cove to the north. It is less than 10 km to the Sydney central business district. Much of Linley Point is surrounded by the Lane Cove River, and is accessed from the south over Figtree Bridge, and from the north via Burns Bay Road. Due to its elevation many houses have views of the river and Sydney city, with some houses also having views of the Sydney Harbour Bridge.

== Houses ==
Linley Point is one of the smallest suburbs in Sydney, with 131 dwellings. It has undergone some redevelopment, particularly of older homes. Linley Point is also home to several historic houses, including the NSW heritage listed Linley House on View Street, and Rockcliffe on Lower Brooks Street.

== Parks ==
Linley Point has a relatively large park situated on The Crescent. It is sometimes used for annual get-together events by Linley Point residents. New playground equipment and landscaping were added to the park in 2012. The changing demographics of the suburb has seen the park regularly used by local children.

== Transport ==
There is only one access road in and out of Linley Point, being View St. There is a bus stop on Burns Bay Road near View St, which has Busways and Transit Systems buses going to Gladesville, Wynyard, Chatswood and Burwood, as well as school bus services. The closest Sydney Ferries wharf is either Woolwich or Huntleys Point.

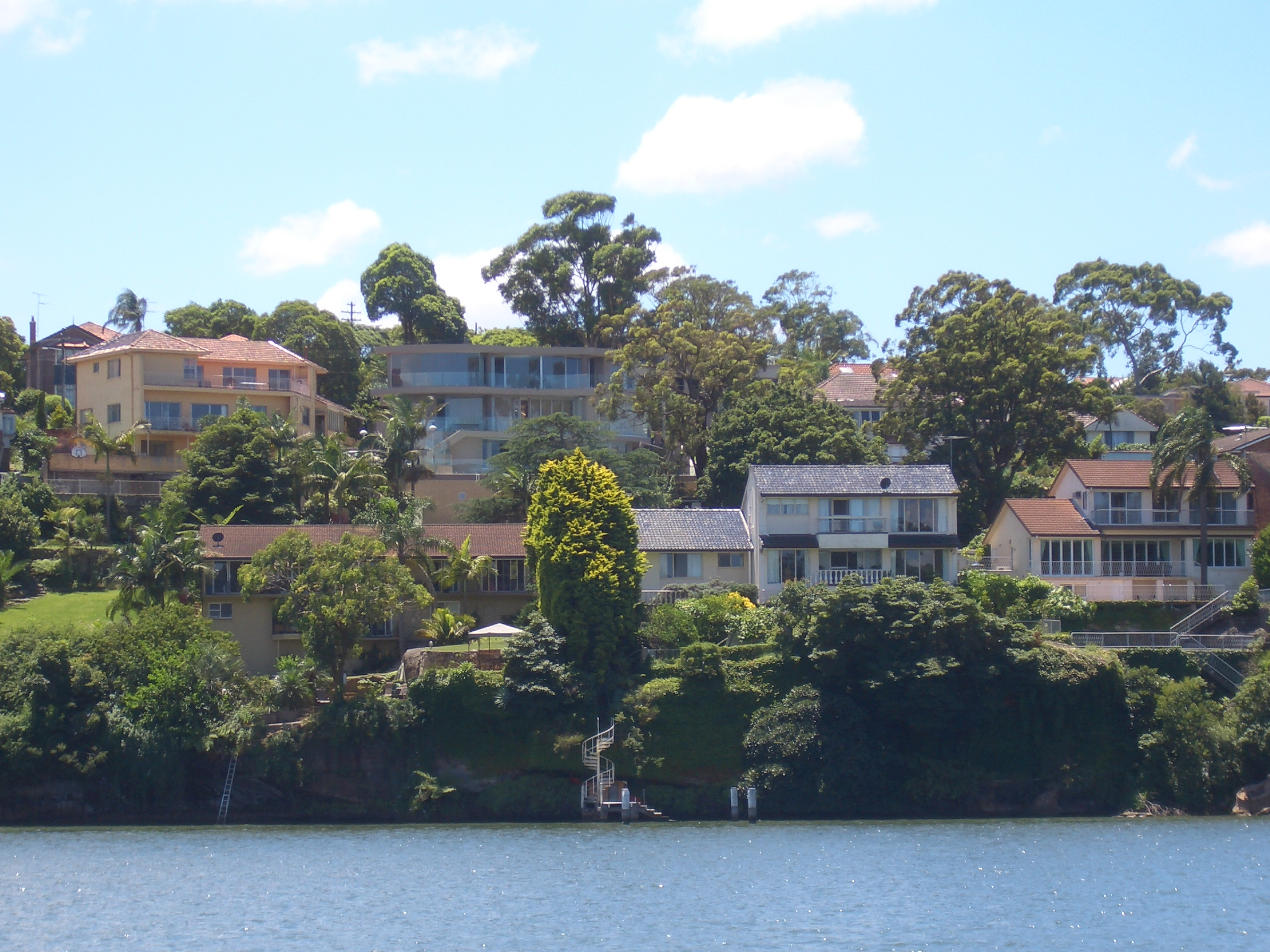
Linley Point, view from Hunters Hill

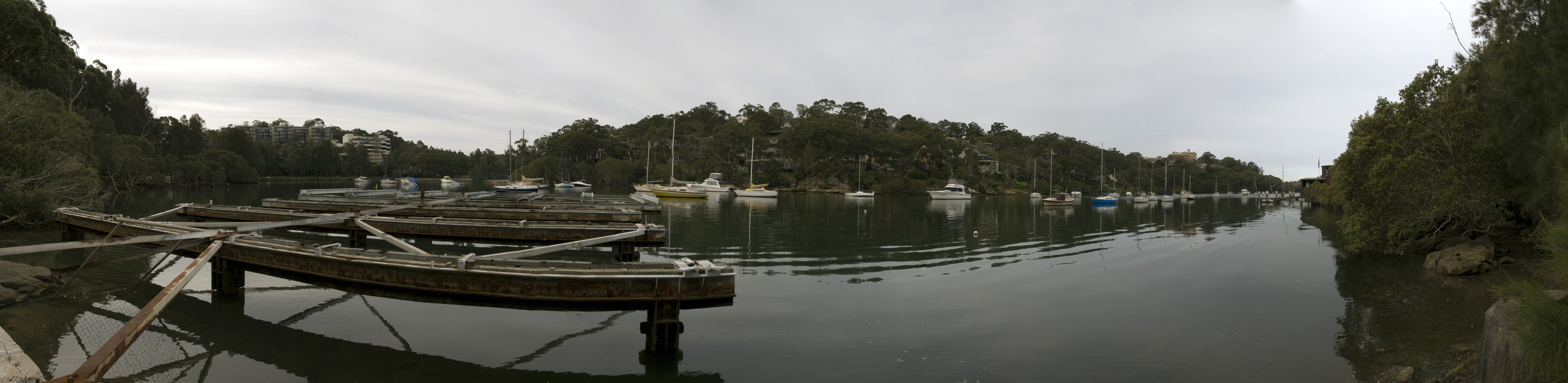
Burns Bay Panorama, view from Linley Point
