= Lane Cove West =

- Suburb
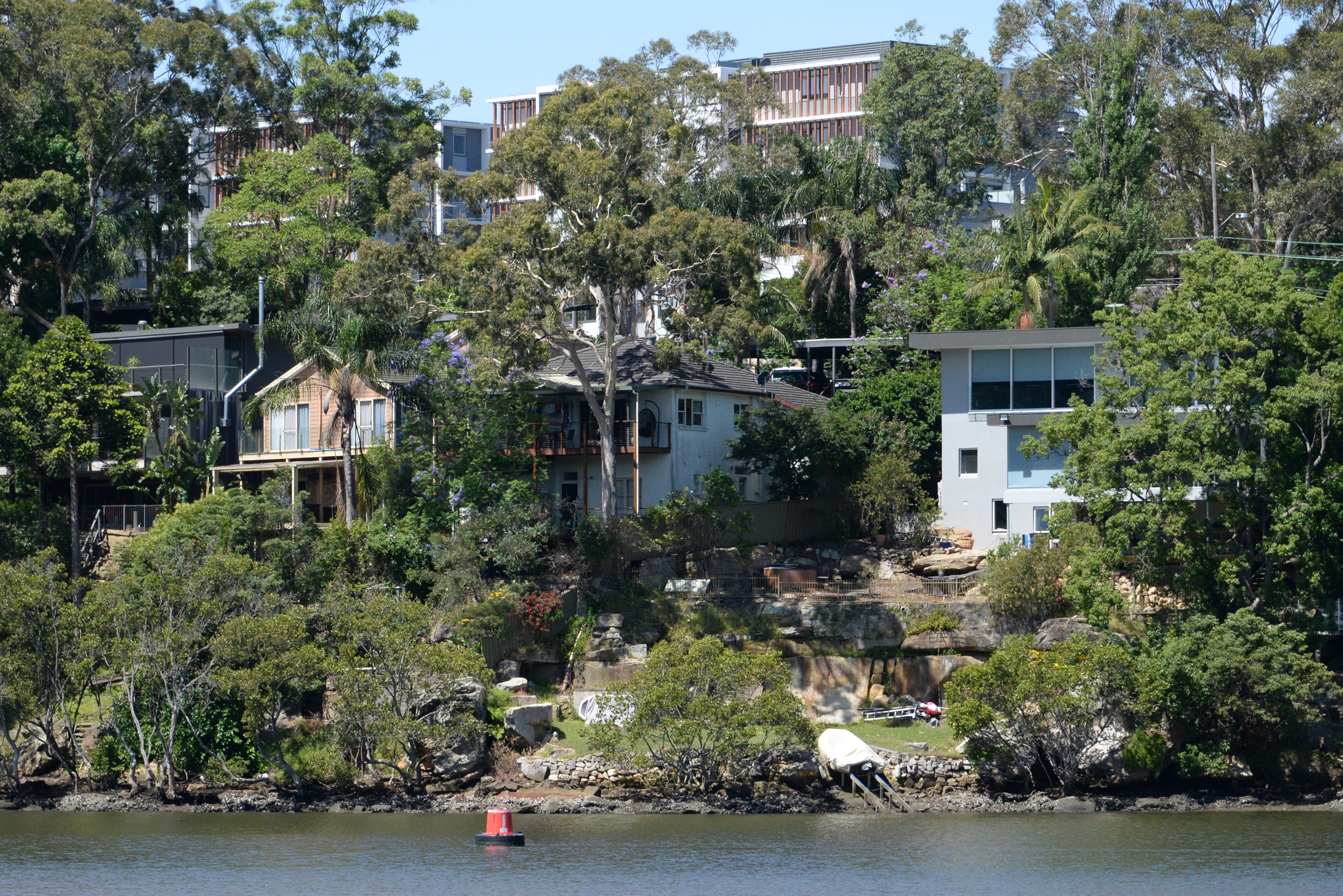
- Houses in Lane Cove West

- Interactive map of Lane Cove West
- Country: Australia
- State: New South Wales
- City: Sydney
- LGA: Municipality of Lane Cove
- Location: 9 km (5.6 mi) north-west of Sydney CBD

Government
  - State electorate: Lane Cove
  - Federal division: Bennelong

Population
  - Total: 3,146 (2021 census)
- Postcode: 2066
Suburbs around Lane Cove West
North Ryde	Lane Cove North	Chatswood West
East Ryde	Lane Cove West	Lane Cove
Hunters Hill	Linley Point	Riverview

Lane Cove West is a suburb on the Lower North Shore of Sydney, in the state of New South Wales, Australia. Lane Cove West is located nine kilometres north-west of the Sydney central business district, in the local government area of the Municipality of Lane Cove. Lane Cove and Lane Cove North are separate suburbs.

== History ==
The land in the area was originally used for agriculture and owned by John Blackman. From the mid-1950s Lane Cove West was home to the national head office, pressing plant, warehouse and recording studios of the Warner Records label Festival Records. Lane Cove West Public School was also built at this time.

Lane Cove West split off from Lane Cove to become a separate suburb on 6 September 2002.

== Population ==
In the 2021 Census, there were 3,146 people in Lane Cove West. 58.3% of people were born in Australia. The most common countries of birth were England 4.6% and China 3.8%. 67.6% of people only spoke English at home. The most common responses for religion were No Religion 37.0%, Catholic 26.7% and Anglican 10.1%.

== Commercial area ==
Lane Cove West Business Park is an industrial area with factories and warehouses. Most of these are located on Mars Road and Sam Johnson Way.

There are also a number of small businesses situated at Figtree Plaza on Cullen Street and Burns Bay Road. These include a hair salon, cafe, beautician, fish and chip shop, award winning fruit & vegetable market, and butcher shop. Close by is the Metropolitan Baptist Church.

== Heritage listing ==
- Lane Cove House (c. 1850), at 38 Myee Crescent, is listed on the Register of the National Estate. In the early twentieth century it was a private psychiatric hospital.

== Parks and recreation ==
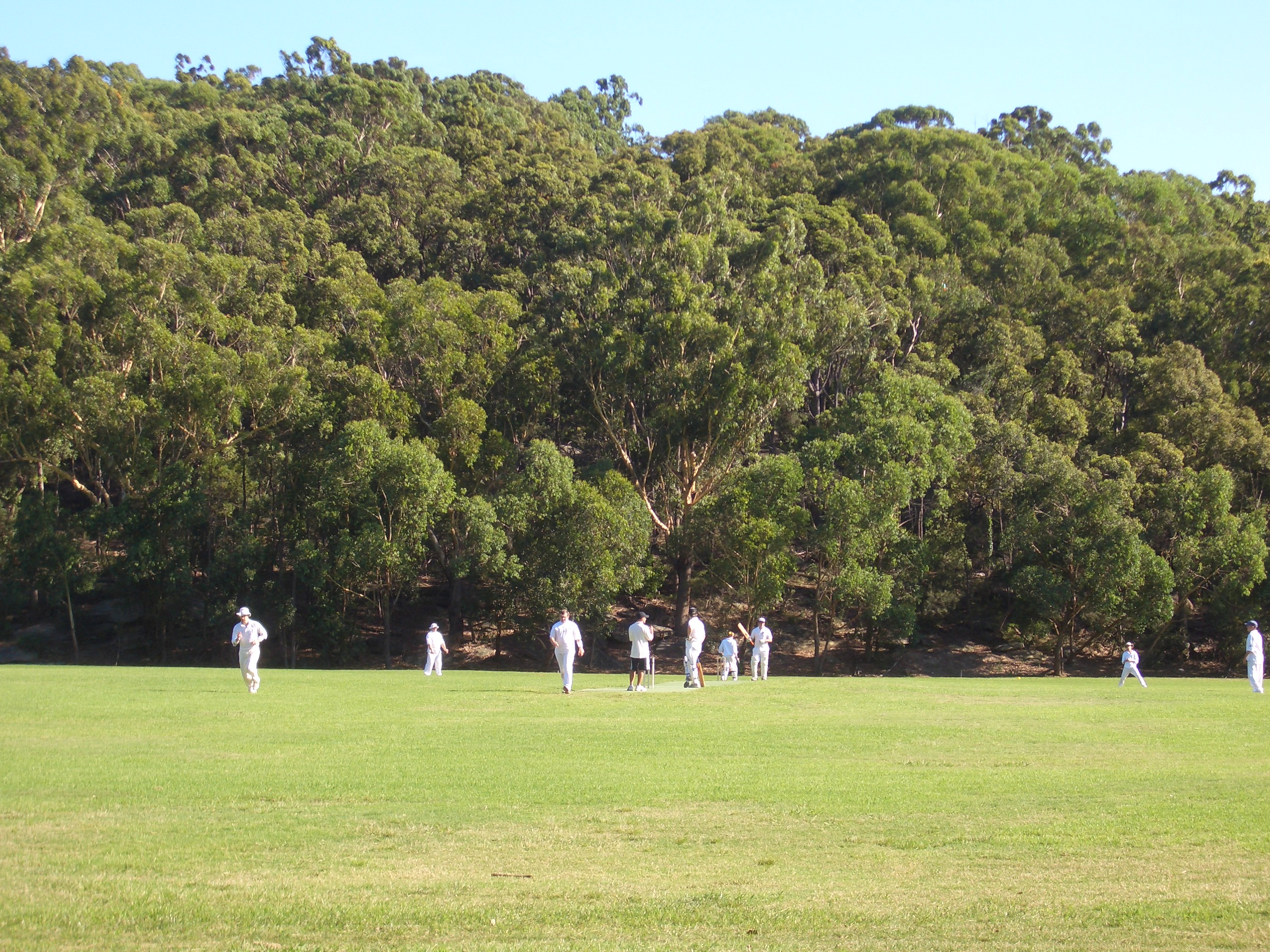
Blackman Park

Blackman Park is situated on the Lane Cove River and was originally a small valley used for landfill. It features a number of recreation facilities including tennis courts at the Lane Cove West Tennis Club, cricket pitches, bike tracks, basketball court, skate park and bush walking tracks. Smaller reserves include Cullen Street Reserve, Henley Reserve, Penrose Street Park, Garthowen Street Cricket Nets and Epping Road Reserve.
