= Epping Road Bridge =

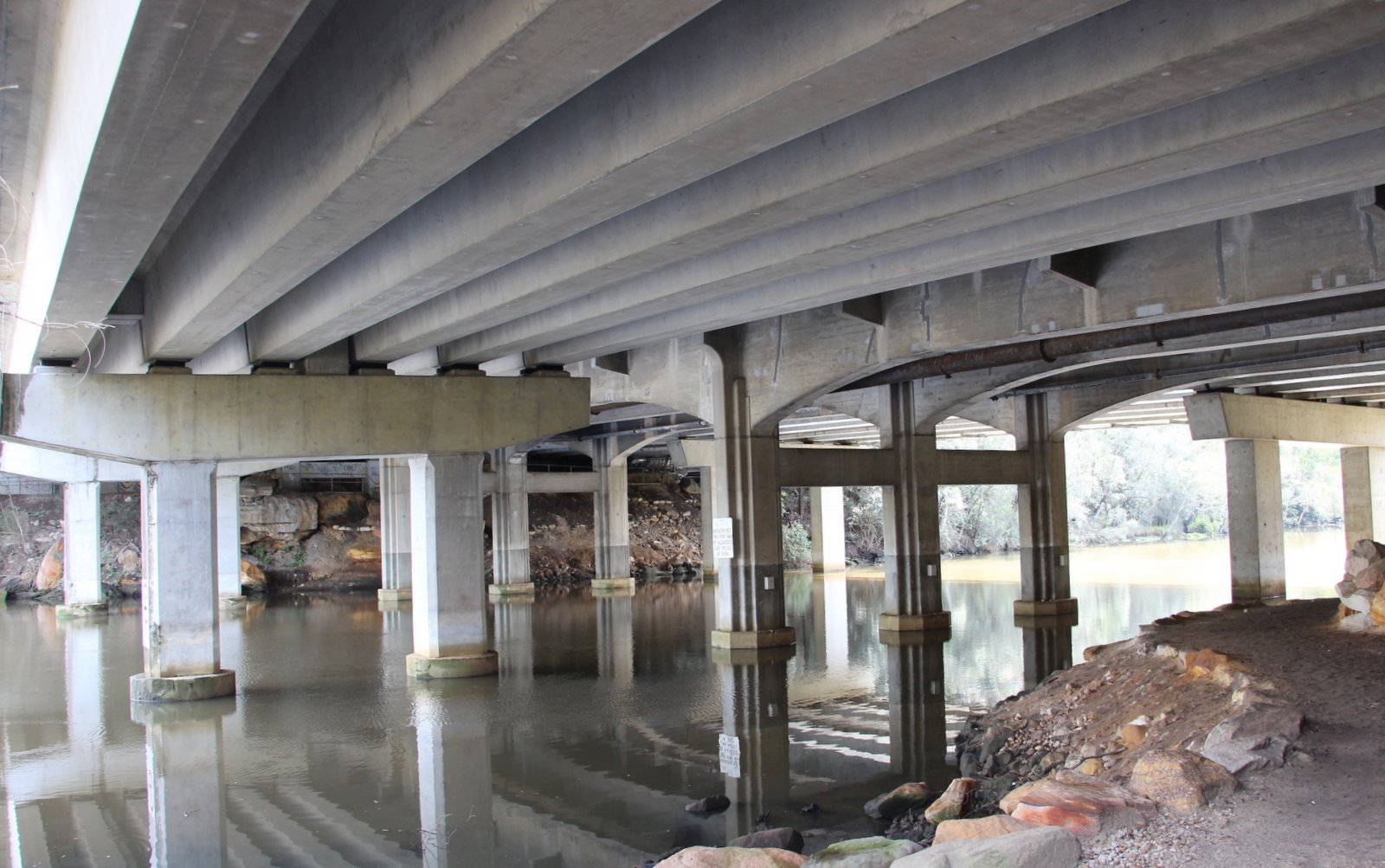
- viewed from the Great North Walk
- Coordinates: 33°48′03″S 151°08′38″E
- Crosses: Lane Cove River
- Locale: North Ryde, Sydney, Australia
- Named for: Epping Road
- Owner: Transport for NSW

Characteristics
- Material: Concrete

History
- Opened: 1939

The Epping Road Bridge is a road bridge that carries Epping Road across the Lane Cove River in North Ryde, Sydney, Australia. Construction began in 1938.

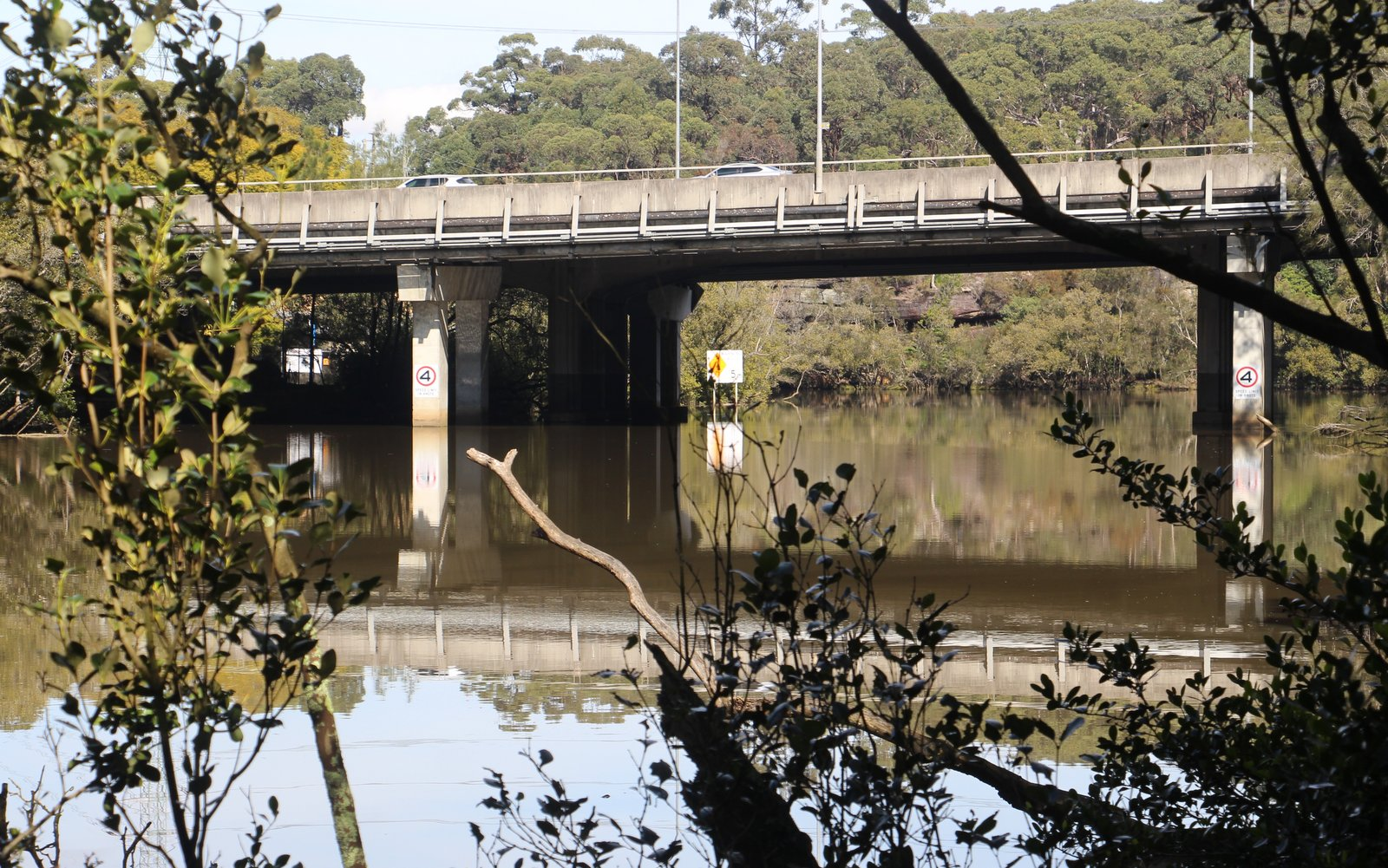
view from upstream

== See also ==
- List of bridges in Sydney
