= Epping Road =

Road in northern Sydney, Australia

Epping Road New South Wales
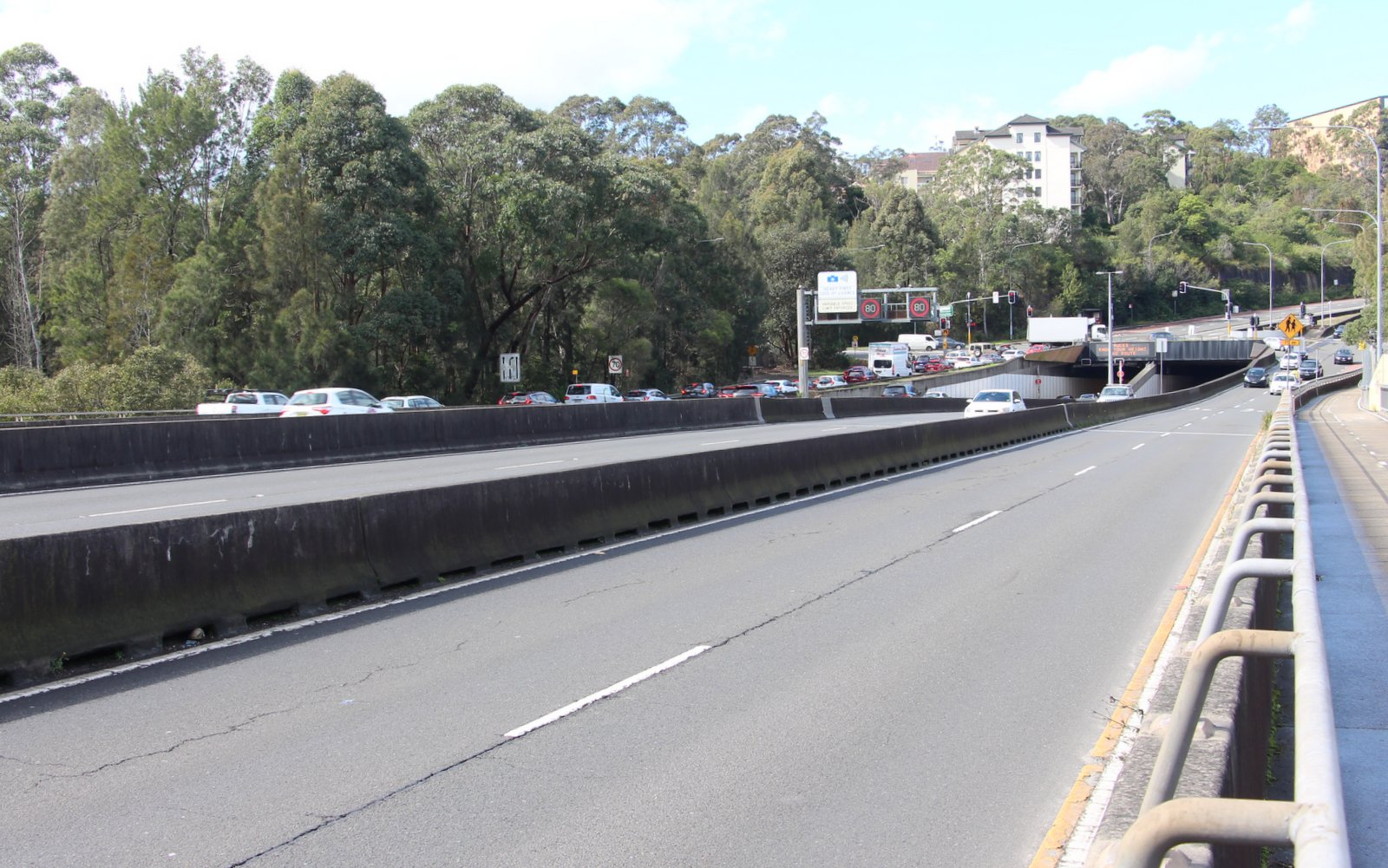
- Epping Road near the Lane Cove Tunnel
- Coordinates: 33.773850°S 151.083134°E (Northwest end); 33.812430°S 151.170921°E (Southeast end)

General information
- Type: Road
- Length: 10 km (6.2 mi)
- Gazetted: March 1938
- Former route number: Metroad 2 (1993–2007); State Route 28 (1974–1993)

Major junctions
- Northwest end: Beecroft Road; Epping, Sydney
- Lane Cove Road; Delhi Road; Lane Cove Tunnel
- Southeast end: Longueville Road; Lane Cove, Sydney

Location(s)
- Major suburbs: Marsfield, Macquarie Park, North Ryde

Epping Road is a 10-kilometre-long (6.2 mi) is a major arterial road linking the lower North Shore and Sydney central business district to the north western suburbs of the upper North Shore and Hills District of Sydney, New South Wales, Australia, being a major access road to the commercial, industrial and university areas of North Ryde and Macquarie Park.

== Route ==
Epping Road commences at the intersection with Blaxland and Beecroft Roads in Epping and runs in a south-easterly direction as a four-lane, single carriageway road, widening into a dual-carriageway road after crossing Terrys Creek into Marsfield. It crosses over Lane Cove Road at an interchange in North Ryde, then straddles the M2 Hills Motorway on either side before crossing the Lane Cove River shortly afterwards, where the motorway continues underground into the Lane Cove Tunnel. The road continues at surface level in a south-easterly direction through Lane Cove West, before eventually terminating at an intersection with Longueville Road in Lane Cove, about 400 metres (1,300 ft) west from the junction of Longueville Road with Pacific Highway and Gore Hill Freeway.

== History ==
Epping Road was originally constructed in the late 1930s as an entirely-new road, in contrast to most other main roads in Sydney, which had routes originally established in the early 19th century.

The passing of the Main Roads Act of 1924 through the Parliament of New South Wales provided for the declaration of Main Roads, roads partially funded by the State government through the Main Roads Board (later Transport for NSW). With the subsequent passing of the Main Roads (Amendment) Act of 1929 to provide for additional declarations of State Highways and Trunk Roads, the Department of Main Roads (having succeeded the MRB in 1932) declared Main Road 373 from Terrys Creek along Sebastopol Road to the intersection with Lane Cove Road, and from the intersection with Delhi Road along Lucknow Road and Moore Street to the intersection with Longueville Road in Lane Cove on 16 March 1938; this was successively extended further west along Laurel Avenue to Epping on 21 June 1938, then along Carlingford Road to Carlingford on 17 April 1940.

The full length of the route, between Blaxland Road in Epping and Longueville Road in Lane Cove, was officially named Epping Road on 9 September 1959. Main Road 373 was extended one last time, with its eastern end running along Longueville Road to terminate at Pacific Highway, on 22 February 1967.

In the 1960s and 1970s, Epping Road was further reconstructed as a mostly six lane arterial road, a major road project which lasted more than 10 years and involved the widening of the bridges at Lane Cove River and Stringybark Creek to six lanes. As vehicle use increased traffic congestion increased.

The passing of the Roads Act of 1993 updated road classifications and the way they could be declared within New South Wales. Under this act, Epping Road retains its declaration as part of Main Road 373.

The route was allocated part of State Route 28 in 1974, before it was replaced as part of Metroad 2 in 1993. When Hills Motorway opened in 1997, the western half of Metroad 2 was reallocated along it, leaving Epping Road west of North Ryde unallocated. The remaining stretch of Metroad 2 remaining along Epping Road was eventually reallocated along the Lane Cove Tunnel when it opened in 2007.

Hills Motorway opened in May 1997, diverging from Epping Road north-west of the Lane Cove River, and bypassing North Ryde and Epping. The Lane Cove Tunnel opened in March 2007, joining with the motorway to run underneath Epping Road and bypassing Lane Cove. Some months after the opening of the tunnel and regaining traffic capacity, Epping Road was reconstructed to introduce dedicated bus lanes, a continuous cycleway on the southern side of the road, and right-turn lanes reinstated for westbound traffic at Parklands Avenue and Centennial Avenue, amongst other changes. These changes were part of the contractual agreement between the state government and the developers of the Lane Cove Tunnel, prior to the tunnel's construction.

In mid-2011, work commenced on removing the entire median strip, wire barrier system, and native bushes from the section between Wicks Road and Delhi Road.

== Major intersections ==
LGA	Location	km	mi	Destinations	Notes
Parramatta	Epping	0.0	0.0	Beecroft Road (west) – Carlingford, Beecroft	Northwestern terminus of road
Parramatta	Epping	0.0	0.0	Blaxland Road (south) – Eastwood, Ryde; Langston Place (north) – Epping	
Ryde	Macquarie Park–North Ryde boundary	4.8	3.0	Lane Cove Road (A3) – Mona Vale, Pymble, Ryde, Hurstville	Diamond interchange
Ryde	Macquarie Park–North Ryde boundary	5.8	3.6	Delhi Road – Chatswood, Roseville, Dee Why to M2 Hills Motorway (M2) – Epping, Baulkham Hills, Seven Hills, Windsor	
Ryde	North Ryde	6.6	4.1	Lane Cove Tunnel (M2) – North Sydney, Crows Nest	Eastbound entrance and westbound exit only
Willoughby	Lane Cove North	7.2	4.5	Mowbray Road – Lane Cove North, Artarmon, Willoughby	
Lane Cove	Lane Cove North–Lane Cove West–Lane Cove tripoint	9.2	5.7	Centennial Avenue – Lane Cove North, Hunters Hill	
Lane Cove	Lane Cove North–Lane Cove boundary	10.0	6.2	Parklands Avenue – Lane Cove North	
Lane Cove	Lane Cove North–Lane Cove boundary	10.0	6.2	Longueville Road – Artarmon, Longueville	Southwestern terminus of road
Incomplete access; Route transition

== See also ==
- Gore Hill and Epping Road cycleways
