= Lane Cove North =

- Suburb
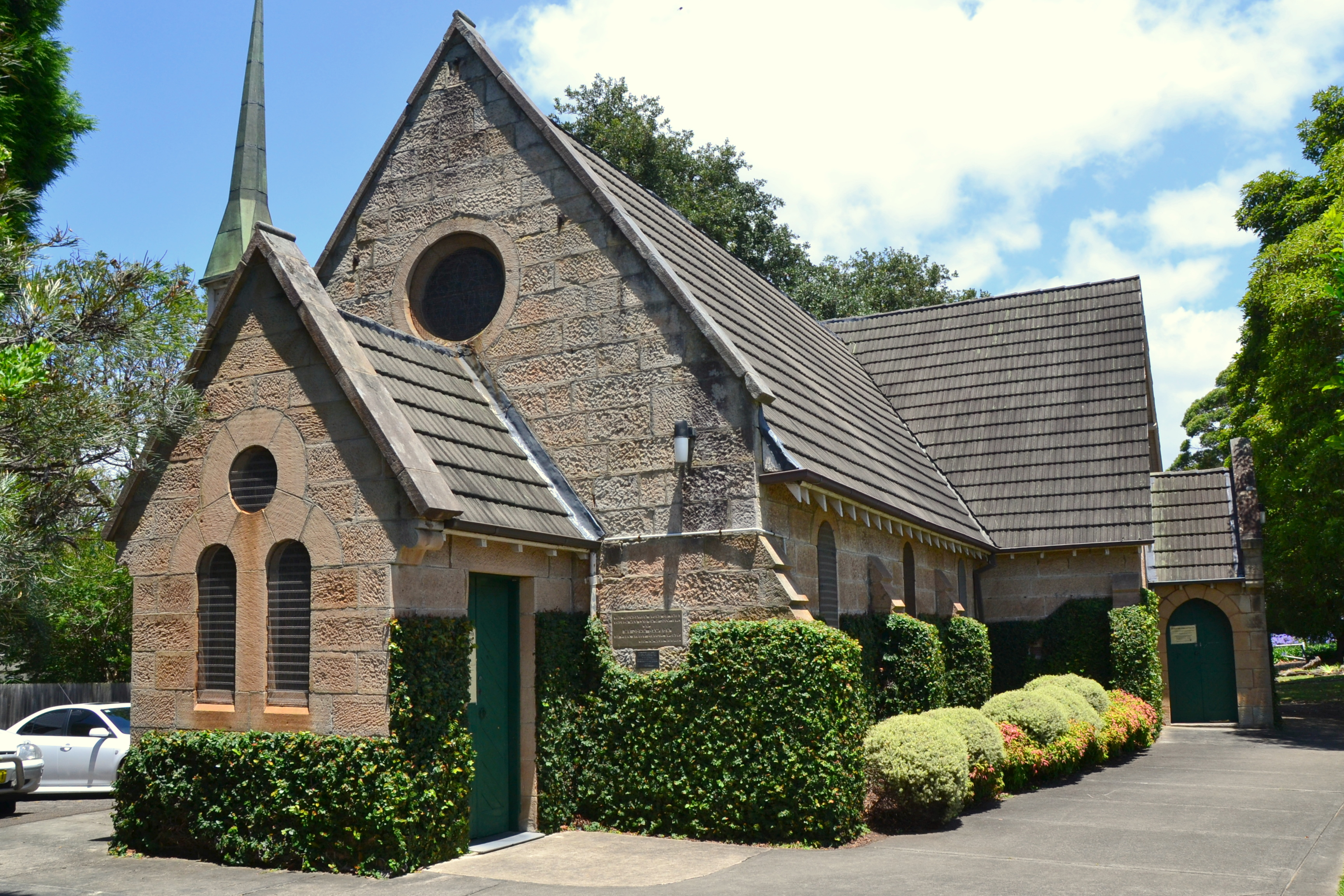
- Chatswood South Uniting Church

- Interactive map of Lane Cove North
- Country: Australia
- State: New South Wales
- City: Sydney
- LGAs: Municipality of Lane Cove; City of Willoughby
- Location: 11 km (6.8 mi) NW of Sydney CBD
- Established: 20 January 2006

Government
  - State electorate: Lane Cove Willoughby
  - Federal division: Bennelong

Population
  - Total: 11,773 (2021 census)
- Postcode: 2066
Suburbs around Lane Cove North
North Ryde	North Ryde	Chatswood West
North Ryde	Lane Cove North	Lane Cove
East Ryde	Lane Cove West	Lane Cove West

Lane Cove North is a suburb on the Lower North Shore of Sydney, in the state of New South Wales, Australia. Lane Cove North is located 11 kilometres north-west of the Sydney central business district, in the local government areas of the Municipality of Lane Cove and the City of Willoughby. Lane Cove and Lane Cove West are separate suburbs.

Boundaries are the Pacific Highway in east, Epping Road in the south, Lane Cove River in the west and Chatswood Golf Course in the north. The Local Government boundary is Mowbray Road.

== History ==
The suburb of Lane Cove was founded as a World War II veterans' home grant area. Lane Cove North became a separate suburb on 20 January 2006.

Parts of Lane Cove North, have been previously known as Lane Cove West, Lane Cove and Lane Cove River

In 2005, the area briefly caught the attention of the world's press when part of an apartment block (Note: The apartment block was classified as being in Lane Cove at the time of the collapse, but it is now classified as being in the suburb of North Lane Cove) collapsed into an excavation for the Lane Cove Tunnel and a pet bird in the evacuated block was rescued by a robot. The area is undergoing significant redevelopment.

== Heritage listings ==
Lane Cove North has a number of heritage-listed sites, including:

- 518 Pacific Highway: Chatswood South Uniting Church

== Schools ==
- Mowbray Public School

== Churches and Temples ==
- Presbyterian Church (Indonesian)
- Chatswood South Uniting Church
- Happy Science Shoshinkan

== Sport and recreation ==
- Lane Cove Rugby Club and Lane Cove Junior Rugby Club, Tantallon Oval
- Lane Cove Tigers Junior Rugby League club, Tantallon Oval
- North Sydney Athletics and Northern Suburbs Little Athletics, Chatswood War Memorial Athletic Field
- Tennis Club, corner of Hatfield Street and Mowbray Road
- Scouts, Avian Crescent

== Parks ==
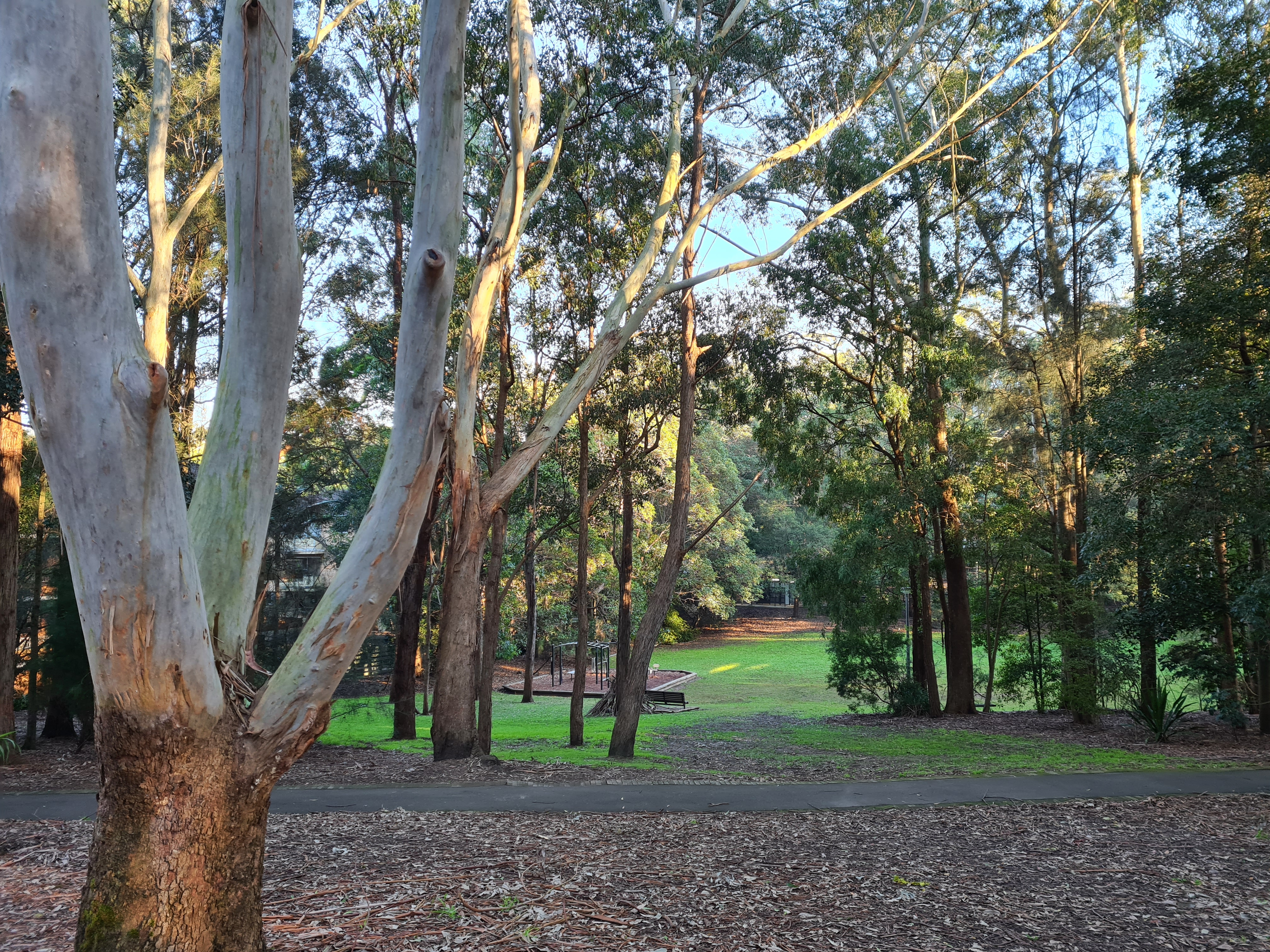
Helen Street Reserve

- Tantallon Oval, cnr Epping Road and Tantallon Street
- Chatswood War Memorial Athletic Field, Mowbray Road
- Batten Creek Reserve, Kullah Parade
- Stringybark Reserve, Karilla Avenue
- Helen Street Reserve, Helen Street
- Mindarie Park, Cnr Mindarie and Kullah Streets
- Coolaroo Park, Moola Parade
- Girraween Park, Girraween Street
- Stokes Park, Stokes Street
- Kingsford Smith Park, Ulm Street
- Mowbray Primary Oval, Hatfield Street

== Demographics ==
At the 2021 census, the suburb of Lane Cove North recorded a population of 11,773. Of these:

- Age distribution: The median age was 36 years, compared to the national median of 38 years. Children aged under 15 years made up 17.7% of the population (national average is 18.2%) and people aged 65 years and over made up 12.1% of the population (national average is 17.2%).
- Ethnic diversity : 53.0% of people were born in Australia, compared to the national average of 66.9%; the next most common countries of birth were China 5.6%, England 4.1%, India 3.1%, Hong Kong 2.2% and Philippines 2.0%. 60.3% of people spoke only English at home. Other languages spoken at home included Mandarin 6.3%, Cantonese 4.8%, Japanese 2.1%, Spanish 1.9% and Persian 1.7%.
- Finances: The median household weekly income was $2,386, compared to the national median of $1,746. This difference is also reflected in real estate prices, with the median mortgage payment in Lane Cove North being $2,600 per month, compared to the national median of $1,863.
- Transport: On the day of the Census, 5.9% of employed people used public transport as at least one of their methods of travel to work and 26.0% used car (either as driver or as passenger).
- Housing: 70.8% of occupied private dwellings were flats, units or apartments; 23.0% were separate houses, and 6.1% were semi-detached (row or terrace houses, townhouses etc.). The average household size was 2.3 people.
- Religion: The most common response for religion was No Religion (43.0%); the next most common responses were Catholic 20.1% and Anglican 8.0%.
