= Riverview, New South Wales =

Riverview
- Suburb
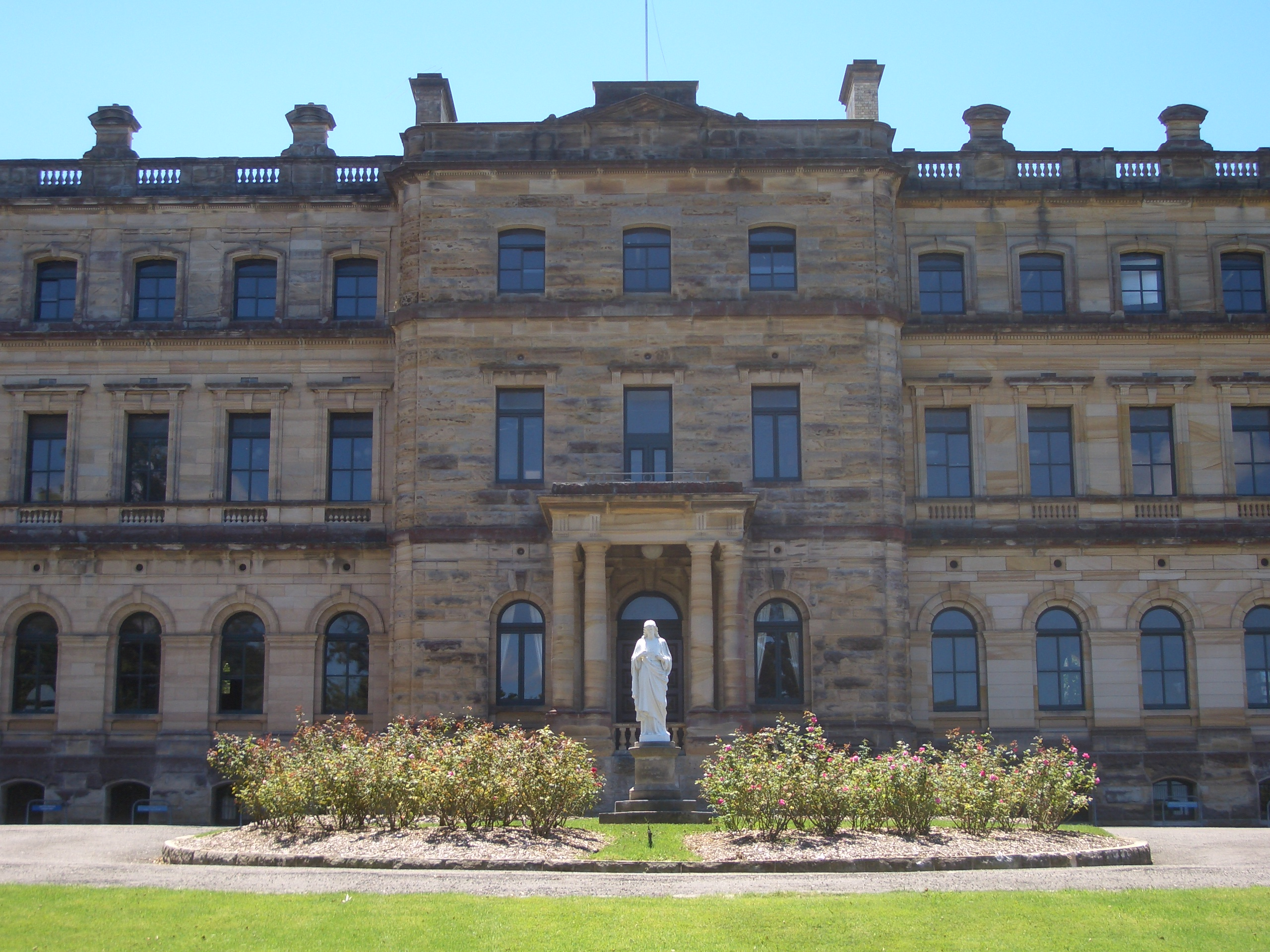
- Main Building, St Ignatius' College

- Interactive map of Riverview
- Country: Australia
- State: New South Wales
- City: Sydney
- LGA: Municipality of Lane Cove
- Location: 9 km (5.6 mi) north-west of Sydney CBD

Government
  - State electorate: Lane Cove
  - Federal division: Bennelong

Population
  - Total: 3,148 (2021 census)
- Postcode: 2066
Suburbs around Riverview
Lane Cove West	Lane Cove	Lane Cove
Linley Point	Riverview	Longueville
Linley Point	Hunters Hill	Longueville

Riverview is a suburb on the Lower North Shore of Sydney, New South Wales, Australia. It is located nine kilometres north-west of the Sydney central business district, in the local government area of the Municipality of Lane Cove. It is situated on the northern side of the Lane Cove River, at the head of Tambourine Bay; the foreshore is occupied by Tambourine Bay Park. Riverview is primarily a residential area.

== History ==
Riverview takes its name from its location, which provides a view of the Lane Cove River. St Ignatius' College was built in 1880.

Tambourine Bay was named for the woman Tambourine Nell or Tambourine Sal, who lived in a cave on the foreshore whilst hiding from police.

== Population ==
In the 2021 census, there were 3,148 people in Riverview. 72.5% of people were born in Australia. The next most common country of birth was England at 5.1%. 84.0% of people only spoke English at home. The most common responses for religion were Catholic 43.0%, No Religion 28.1% and Anglican 12.1%.

== Schools ==
Riverview is home to the Jesuit school, St Ignatius' College, Riverview. Located on Tambourine Bay Road, it was designed by J. Dennehy and built in 1880. A three-storey sandstone building, it was designed in a Victorian Classical style, departing from the convention whereby educational buildings were normally designed in a Gothic style. Extensions were carried out in 1887, 1906 and in the 1920s. The grounds include an observatory and wharf shelter. The school is listed on the Register of the National Estate.

== Church ==
- St Ignatius' College Chapel

== Parks and recreation ==
There are several recreation areas throughout Riverview. Marjorie York Reserve, named after a longtime local resident, is a playground by the local shops and is very popular with families. Tambourine Bay Park occupies the foreshore area.

Tambourine Bay Reserve is a large park situated at the end of Tambourine Bay Road, as well as Kallaroo Road, and contains barbecue and picnic facilities, as well as a playground. It also offers splendid views over Tambourine Bay Road and is a hub for bushwalks to Longueville and around the bay.

Burns Bay Reserve is located in West Riverview and is used for children's soccer matches in the cooler months of the year. Like Tambourine Bay Reserve, it is complete with picnic and barbecue facilities, and also a playground. There is also a small recreation area at the end of the walkway leading from Flaumont Avenue, complete with benches and a swing set.

== Heritage listing ==
- Burns Bay Sewerage Aqueduct

== Transport ==
Busways operates routes 253 to Wynyard and 254 to McMahons Point ferry wharf. Tambourine Bay Road is the main thoroughfare through the area, and leads from Lane Cove's shopping district. River Road West runs along Riverview's northern border, and connects to Lane Cove West and Gladesville to the west and Longueville, North Sydney and the Sydney central business district to the east.

== Climate ==
Climate data for Riverview Observatory (1909–2014)
Month	Jan	Feb	Mar	Apr	May	Jun	Jul	Aug	Sep	Oct	Nov	Dec	Year
Record high °C (°F)	45.4 (113.7)	41.3 (106.3)	40.2 (104.4)	32.7 (90.9)	28.5 (83.3)	24.9 (76.8)	24.5 (76.1)	30.2 (86.4)	34.8 (94.6)	38.0 (100.4)	40.5 (104.9)	43.5 (110.3)	45.4 (113.7)
Mean daily maximum °C (°F)	26.6 (79.9)	26.5 (79.7)	25.2 (77.4)	22.8 (73.0)	19.6 (67.3)	17.2 (63.0)	16.7 (62.1)	18.4 (65.1)	20.7 (69.3)	22.7 (72.9)	24.2 (75.6)	25.7 (78.3)	22.2 (72.0)
Mean daily minimum °C (°F)	17.6 (63.7)	17.7 (63.9)	16.1 (61.0)	12.9 (55.2)	9.9 (49.8)	7.7 (45.9)	6.4 (43.5)	7.2 (45.0)	9.4 (48.9)	12.0 (53.6)	14.2 (57.6)	16.3 (61.3)	12.3 (54.1)
Record low °C (°F)	11.3 (52.3)	11.1 (52.0)	7.4 (45.3)	5.7 (42.3)	3.4 (38.1)	1.2 (34.2)	−1.7 (28.9)	1.4 (34.5)	1.7 (35.1)	5.6 (42.1)	6.9 (44.4)	8.3 (46.9)	−1.7 (28.9)
Average precipitation mm (inches)	106.1 (4.18)	111.5 (4.39)	126.3 (4.97)	109.4 (4.31)	105.6 (4.16)	119.4 (4.70)	84.8 (3.34)	69.5 (2.74)	61.7 (2.43)	75.7 (2.98)	80.4 (3.17)	82.3 (3.24)	1,133.2 (44.61)
Average precipitation days (≥ 0.2 mm)	12.3	12.6	13.7	12.0	11.1	11.8	9.8	9.7	10.2	11.3	11.9	11.5	137.9
