= Tambourine Bay =

Bight in Australia

Coordinates: 33°50′S 151°09′E

Tambourine Bay is a bay located in between the suburbs of Riverview and Longueville in the Lower North Shore of Sydney, NSW, Australia. The bay and its adjoining creek is a northern tributary of the Lane Cove River, a ria that joins Sydney harbour to Greenwich and Woolwich. The bay's foreshore and surrounding park areas are managed by the municipality of Lane Cove.

== History ==
=== Tambourine Sal ===
Tambourine Bay is named after a local woman known as Tambourine Sal. It is suggested that her real name is Sarah Leadbeater, the wife of the explorer and surveyor William Lawson. Sarah Leadbeater would frequently play her tambourine in the streets of Sydney, hence the name Tambourine Sal. Judy Washington, an author for the North Shore Times, first suggested that Sarah Leadbeater would evade the law by hiding in the remote bushlands of Tambourine Bay in a hut on the western foreshore. On 23 March 1812 Sarah Leadbeater was married to William Lawson and settled on a farm in Prospect, New South Wales, where she later died on 11 July 1850 aged 48.

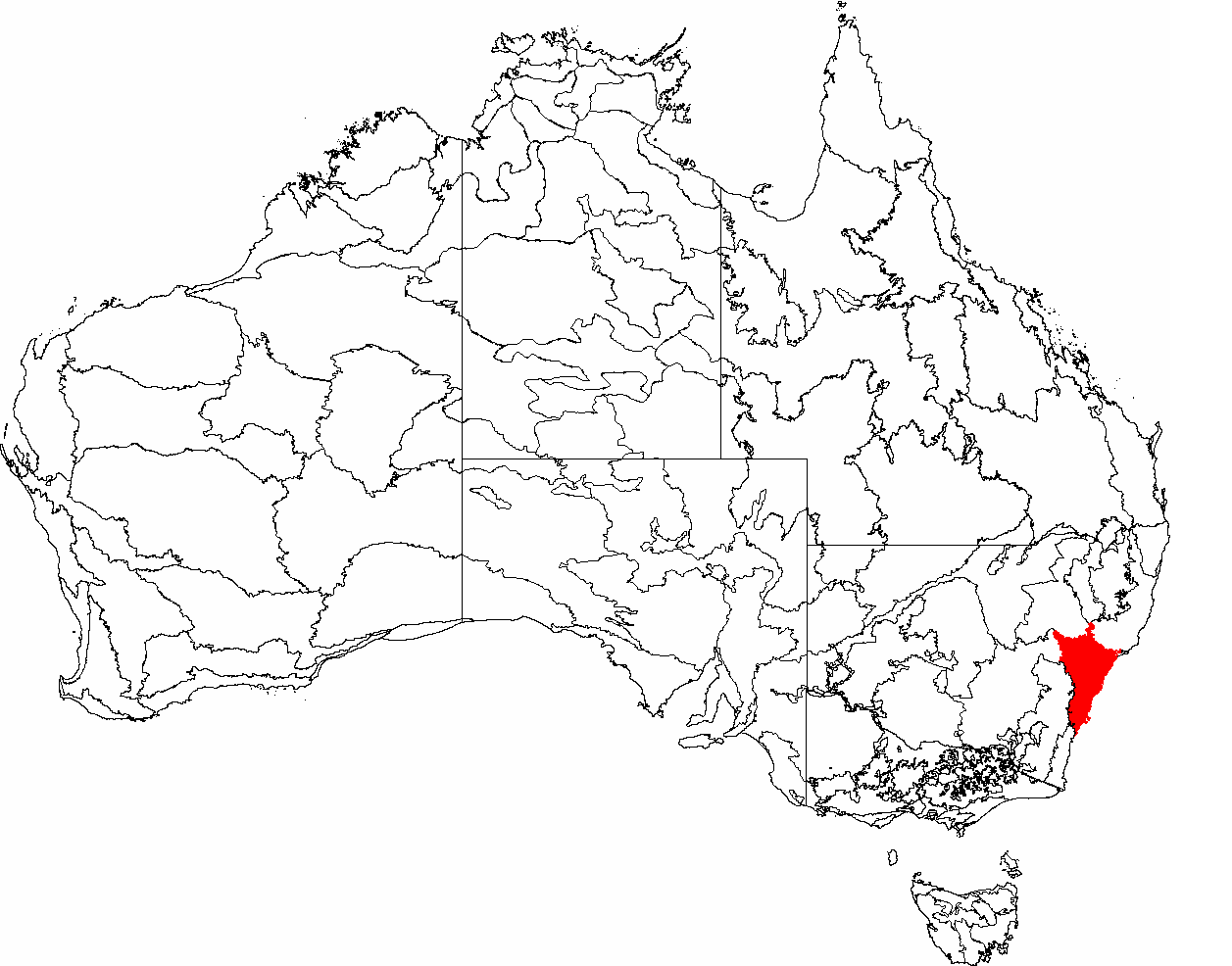
The land owned by the Cammeraygal people shaded in red

=== Aboriginal heritage ===
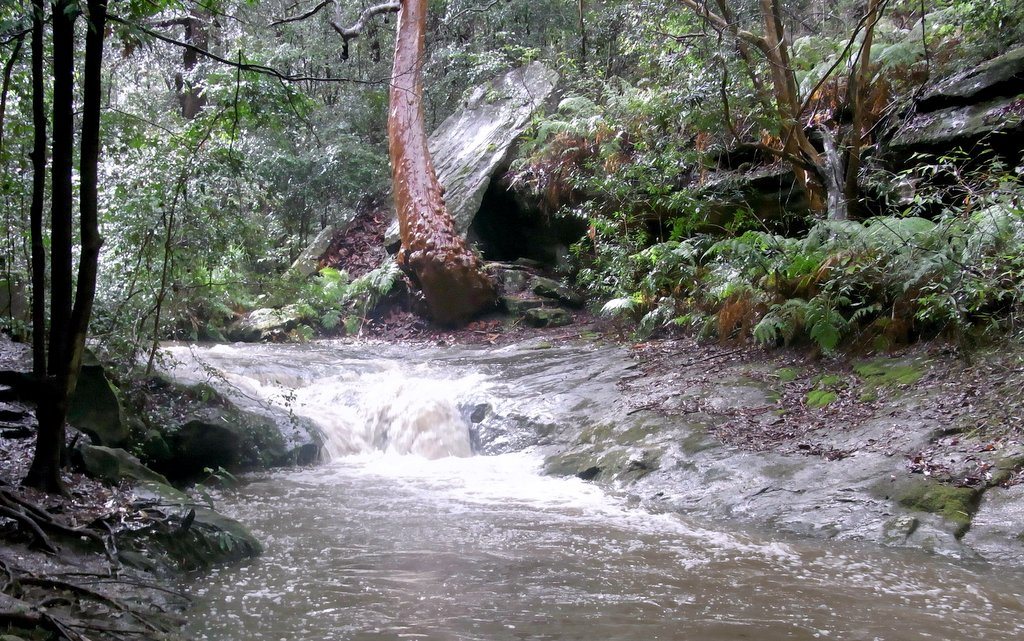
Sandstone cave in Chatswood West, that closely resembles those in Tambourine Bay

Tambourine Bay is an area of the North Sydney foreshore once populated by the Cammeraygal people of the Eora nation. The Cammeraygal peoples’ semi-nomadic hunter gatherer lifestyle depended on Sydney's North Shore tidal mangrove forests and abundance of wildlife to live. In these coastal environments, fishing was a common practice along the harbour foreshore. The Lane Cove River named Turranburra by the local Indigenous population accommodated a variety of fish, crustacean and shellfish species. Instruments such as multi-pronged fishing spears, named "fizz-gigs" by British colonists, and hook lines were used proficiently by men and women on canoes or from rock platforms. Although only smaller marine animals were caught through these methods, larger marine mammals such as dolphins and whales would occasionally beach themselves in the harbour during their northerly migrations in winter. Bones of a dugong in Sydney's Sheas Creek, near Alexandra Canal in 1896 showed evidence of butchering from Aboriginal axes. Separate evacuations around Sydney have discovered other animals including the green sea turtle (Chelonia mynas) and Australian fur seal (Artocephalus pusillus).

The Cammeraygal peoples' proximity to Sydney Harbour provided dense coastal bushland to live and shelter. Sandstone strata along the foreshore and rivers were used as rock dwellings. Remnants of concentrated human activity in these areas are the high volume of rock prints, axe grindings and stone carvings surrounding the shelters. Similar to many other Aboriginal tribes, rock art for the Cammeraygal people was an expression of their spiritual connection to the land. Rock carvings depicting fish and people in many sites in the Lane Cove area indicates Indigenous peoples' spiritual relationship to environment they lived in. In total the Aboriginal Heritage Office estimates there are approximately 4,500 Aboriginal archaeological sites in the Sydney basin.

Many rock shelters were later destroyed by European settlers, who extracted phosphates from the rock to be used in manure as agriculture rapidly spread west of Port Jackson. Diseases foreign to the Aboriginal population, such as smallpox, also devastated the inhabitants along Sydney Harbour. In the 2016 Census, 0.3% of residents in Lane Cove identified as Aboriginal and/or Torres Strait Islander. However these residents have not been confirmed to be of Cammeraygal descent.

== Environment ==
=== Flora ===
==== Native ====
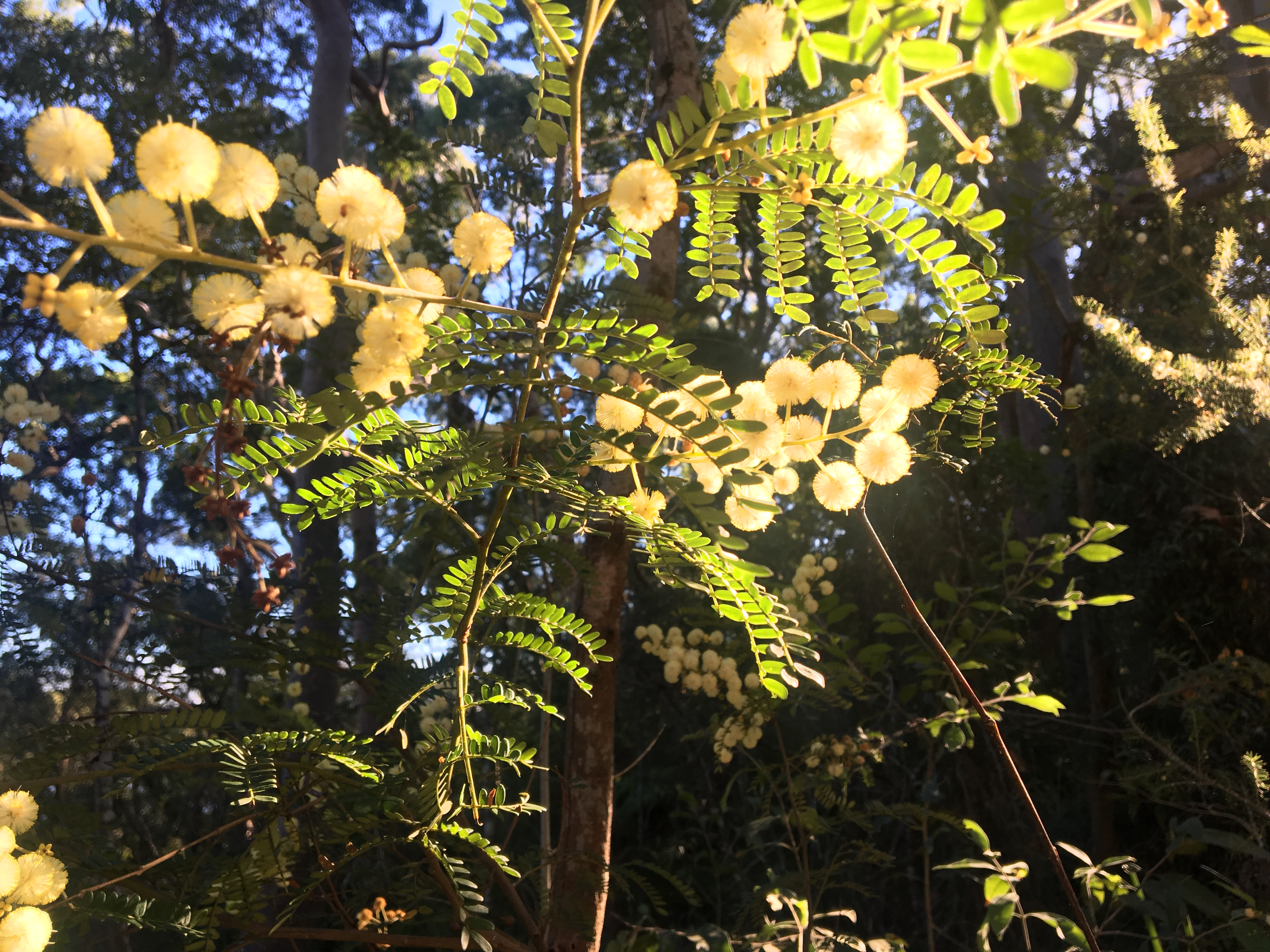
The Australian wattle (Acacia pycnantha)

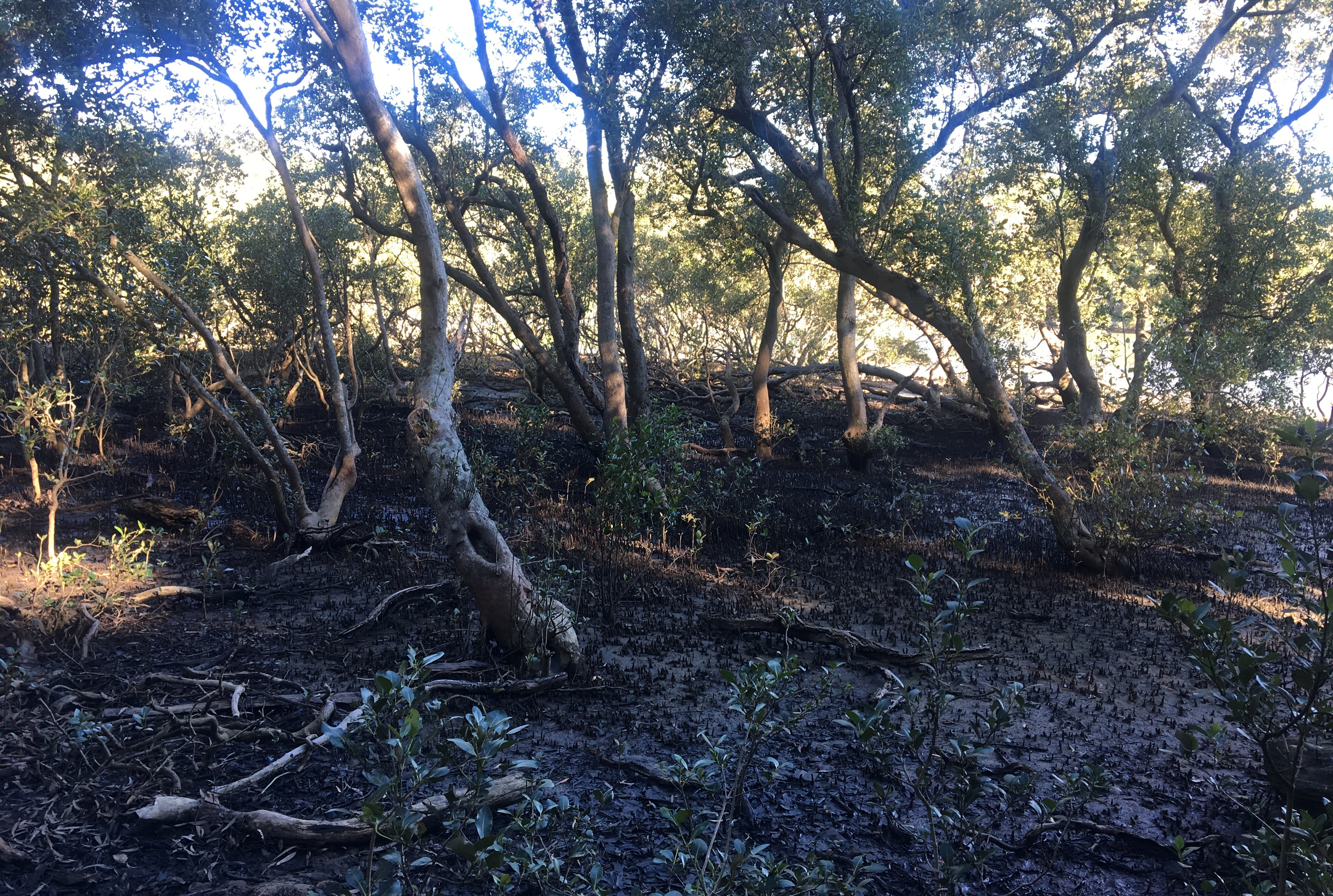
Black Mangrove (Aegiceras corniculatum) along Tambourines Bay's southern central foreshore

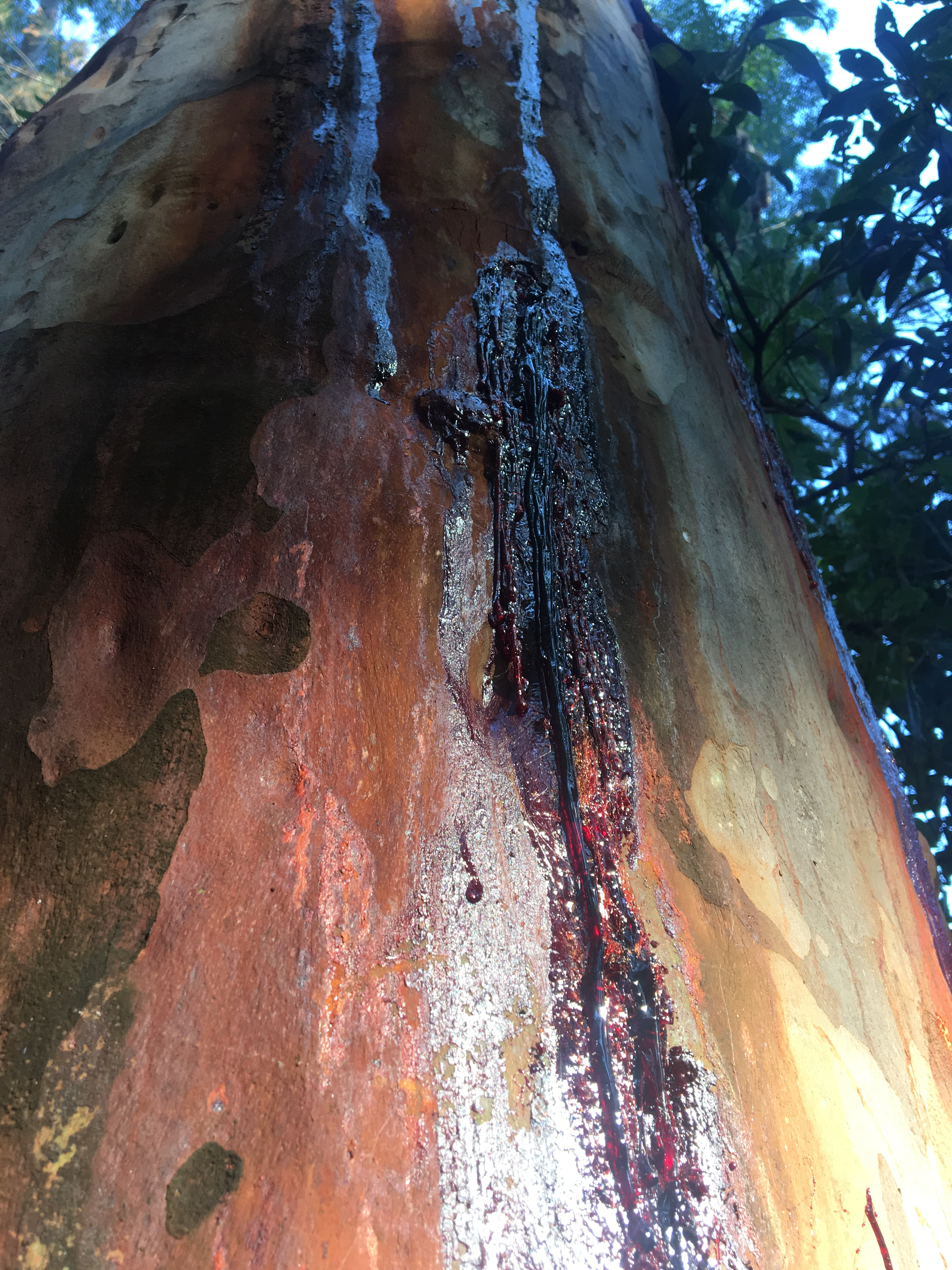
A forest red gum (Eucalyptus tereticornis) in Tambourine Bay. Sap from the tree's trunk is eaten by possums and native birds.

Lane Cove Council's targeted bush regeneration programs in Tambourine Bay's bushland; Warraroon reserve has seen the eventual re-population of native species in the area. Mangroves (Aegiceras corniculatum and Excoecaria agallocha var. agallocha) as part of the bay's native species grows in the coastal saline water, dominate much of the northern and western foreshores. Eucalyptus varieties cover much of Tambourine Bay's bush land, resting several metres above sea water. Species include the forest red gum (Eucalyptus tereticornis) and rusty gum (Angophora costata). Smaller native plants in the bush land include the Australian wattle (Acacia terminalis subsp. Glabrous) whose sweet flowers attractive a variety of native fauna such as possums and lorikeet species.

==== Invasive ====
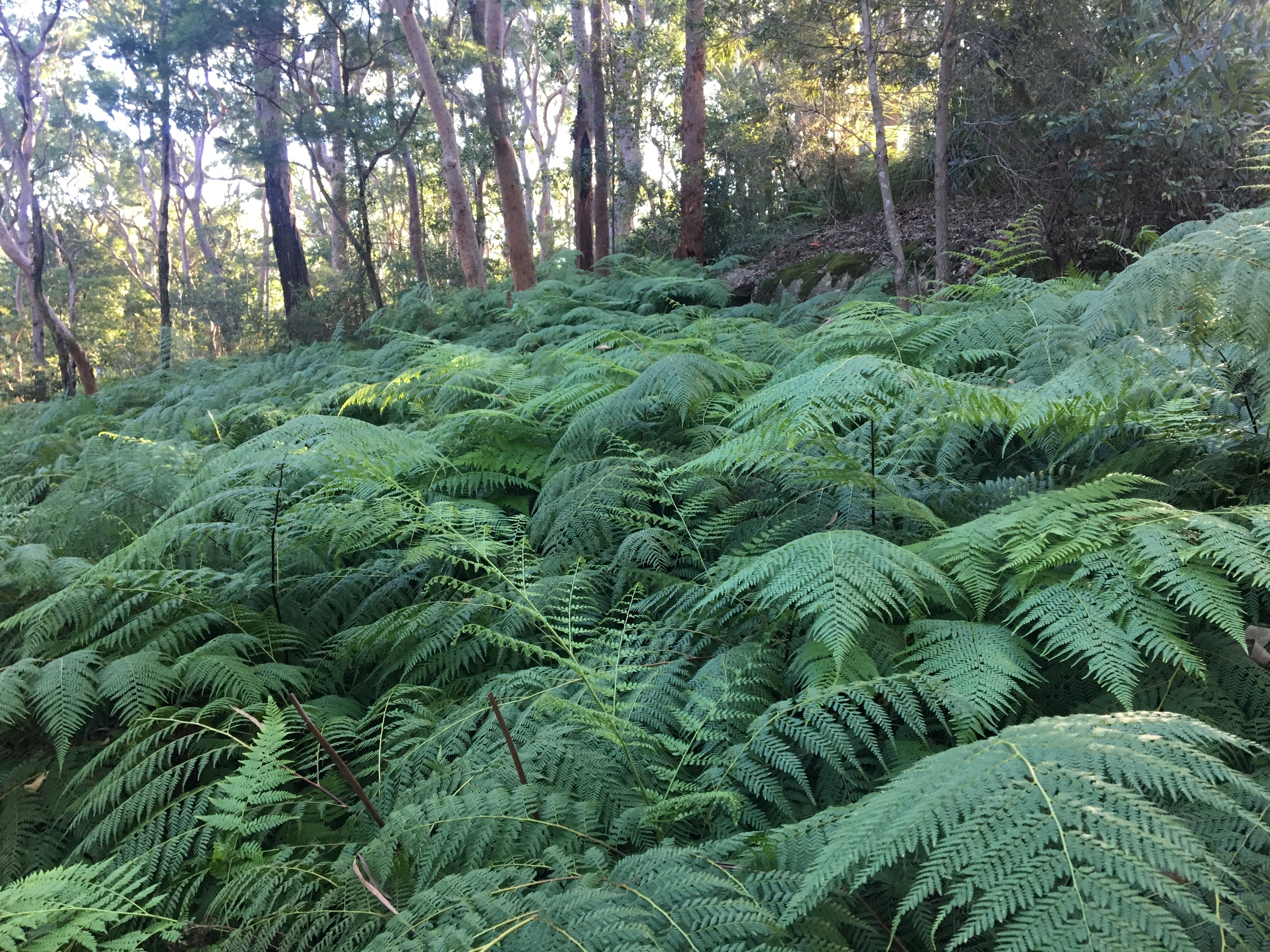
Large naturalised growth of fishbone fern (Nephrolepis cordifolia) along Tambourine Bay's bushtrack

Invasive plant species are also common to the bay's foreshore. Bush regeneration is the primary method used to mitigate the potential harms invasive species have on the natural environment. Through the Lane Cove Council's bush regeneration project, large zones of vegetation were eliminated from Tambourine Bay by weeding or spraying herbicides. Some species to be introduced to Tambourine Bay have become naturalised. Dominating much of the forest floor is fishbone fern (Nephrolepis cordifolia). The fern is endemic to Australia's east coast extending from Queensland to northern regions of New South Wales, and more recently as a weed into the Sydney region, thriving in the damp coastal soils in Tambourine Bay.

=== Fauna ===
==== Birds ====
A variety of native bird species nest and forage in the wet sclerophyll forest that borders the bay. Common species such as sulphur-crested cockatoo (Cacatua galerita), galah (Eolophus roseicapilla), and rainbow lorikeets (Trichoglossus moluccanus) depend on the forest's abundance of seeds, leaf buds and blossoms primarily from eucalyptus and wattle varieties for food. Raptors (birds of prey) are also contingent on a wealth of food in the bay. Species such as the laughing kookaburra (Dacelo novaeguineae) feed largely on insects and worms found in the forest's detritus or crustaceans located in the inter-tidal mangrove forest. The Australian white ibis (Threskiornis molucca), another species native to the Sydney Basin has also been increasingly successful in Tambourine Bay. According to John Martin, wildlife ecologist at the Royal Botanic Gardens in Sydney: "They're considered abundant, however they are declining in some habitats, and they are increasing in other habitats." Observations of the ibis population in Sydney following a study conducted by the NSW Office of Environment & Heritage's annual report on the species show the population of the species in 2015 to be more than double the "natural range". Due to the parkland's increasing use as a place of recreation and ecological appreciation, the birds have benefited from an abundance of food and protection of roosting locations that have largely contributed to their growth in numbers.

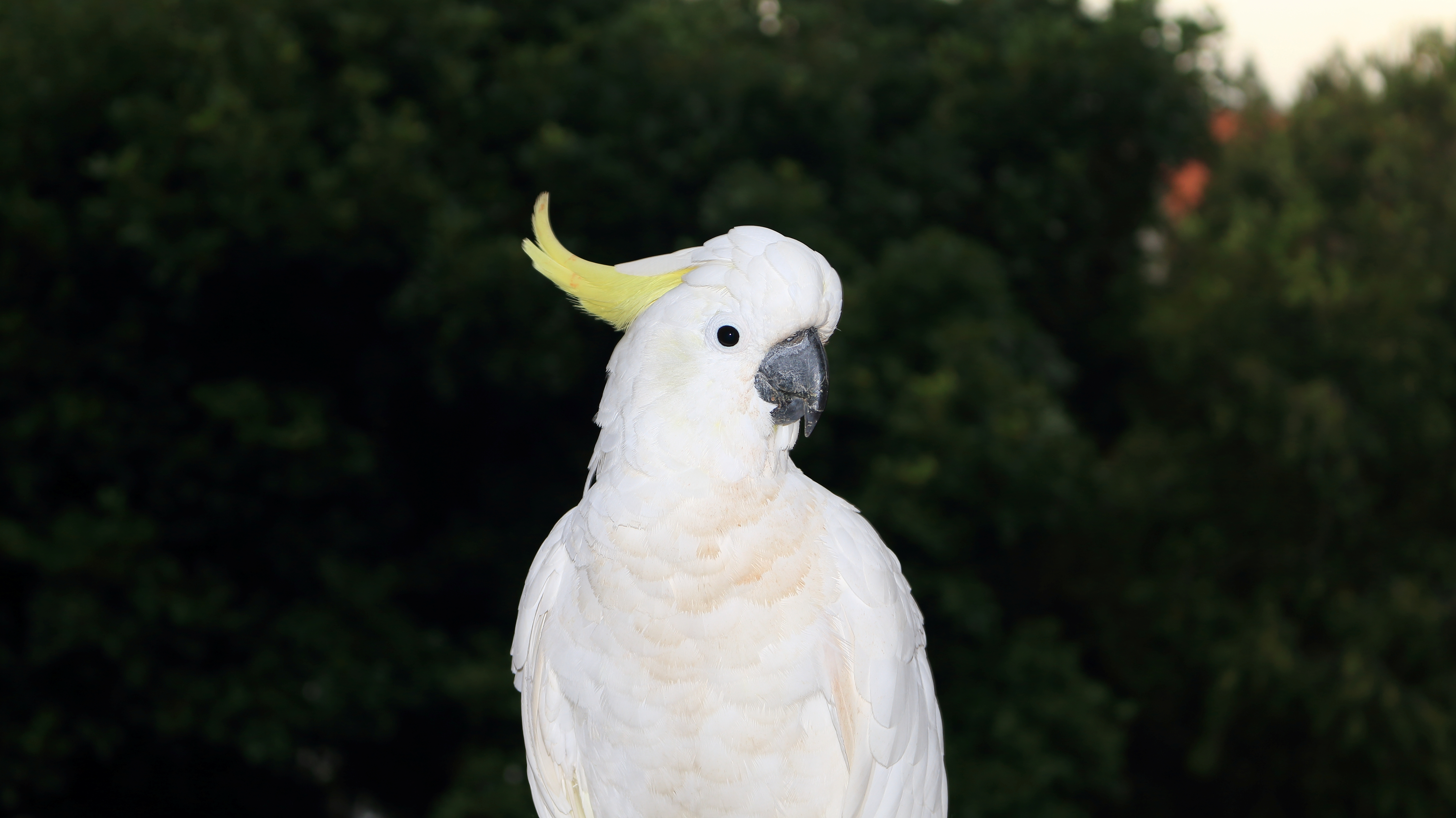
Sulphur-crested cockatoo (Cacatua galerita)

==== Terrestrial ====
Due to the bay's highly urbanised surroundings, only a select few terrestrial animals inhabit the area. Typically, they are docile and nocturnal to contend with the dense human population regularly encroaching on the ecosystem. The common ringtail possum (Pseudocheirus peregrinus), a nocturnal Australian marsupial, feeds on a variety of leaves and sap available in Tambourine Bay's eucalyptus trees. Similarly, the grey-headed flying fox (Pteropus poliocephalus) thrives in the river systems around Sydney harbour, capitalising on the nutrient dense coastal fruits and seeds when feeding at night.

==== Invasive ====
Similar to the broader Sydney region, invasive species continue to threaten the already fragile natural ecosystems among the urbanised city. The European rabbit (Oryctolagus cuniculus) that populates much of the Riverview peninsula including Tambourine Bay is classified as one of the "top five widespread terrestrial pest animals that threaten native fauna and flora". As a grazing herbivore, the European rabbit consumes native flora in any stage of growth, disrupting the cycle of germination for many species. The rabbits' burrowing behaviours further disturbs native flora species, as deep roots can be destroyed and soil moisture around ideal growing positions can be altered. Another invasive species of fauna prevalent in many environmental areas in Tambourine Bay is the common myna or Indian myna (Acridotheres tristis). This small sparling species closely resembles the noisy miner (Manorina melanocephala), a native Australian bird that is regularly pressured to compete with the more aggressive introduced common myna. According to the Lane Cove Council, common myna birds "take over tree hollows and plug up nest sites they are not using, forcing possums and birds out and ejecting nestlings and eggs from their nests". In efforts to prevent further damages caused by the bird, an eradication program has been established around Lane Cove Plaza as a measure of reducing numbers in the broader area.

=== Water quality ===
According to the State of the beaches 2017-2018 Sydney Region, water quality in Tambourine Bay is rated good. Assessment of the bay's water has been conducted from December 2015 to April 2018. Over this monitoring period, the beach grade status has improved as levels of enterococci decrease steadily. Levels of the enterococcus bacteria are low enough in the bay so that swimming is suitable most of the time. However, after rain "potential faecal contamination from stormwater and discharge from the Lane Cove River" exceeds the safe swimming limit.

== Infrastructure ==
=== Tambourine Bay Baths ===
Tambourine Bay baths was a concrete lined pool originally build around 1930. The pool was primarily used by students of St Ignatius’ College Riverview for both competitive swimming training and recreation. After increasing sanitation issues in the tidal pool's water, maintenance and subsequent use of the pool ceased. The pool was eventually demolished in 2015. However, the bay's water quality continues to improve since the pools closure according to the State of the beaches report 2017-2018 by the NSW government, indicating it is safe to swim in the bay's water once again.

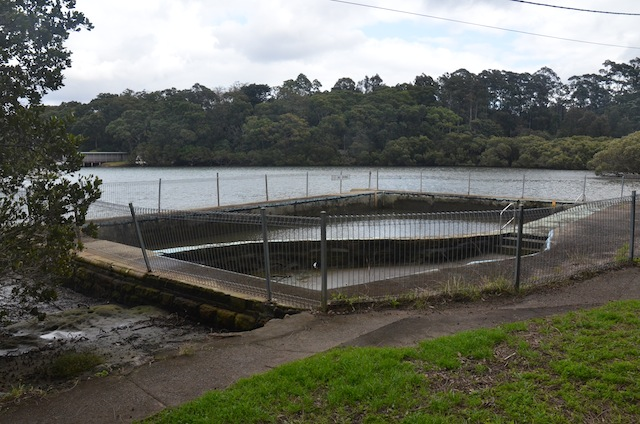
Tambourine Bay Baths

=== Foreshore park ===
Following the demolition of the Harbour Pool in 2015, construction of the Tambourine Bay foreshore park was built immediately in its place. Such action was discussed and eventuated from the 2011-2013 Lane Cove Council "Consultation Comments for Draft Community Strategic Plan". The primary objectives of the new foreshore development were "to maximise the opportunity for all the community to participate in active recreational activities and events" and "to prioritise programs for the maintenance upgrade of recreational facilities".

Due to the site's access constraints and high sensitivity as an environmental space, a barge was used to reach the site by water. This method of construction was in the compliance with the Lane Cove Council's Development Control Plan (DCP 1), first outlined in their annual report 1994/95-1999/2000 to "control development adjacent to bush land".

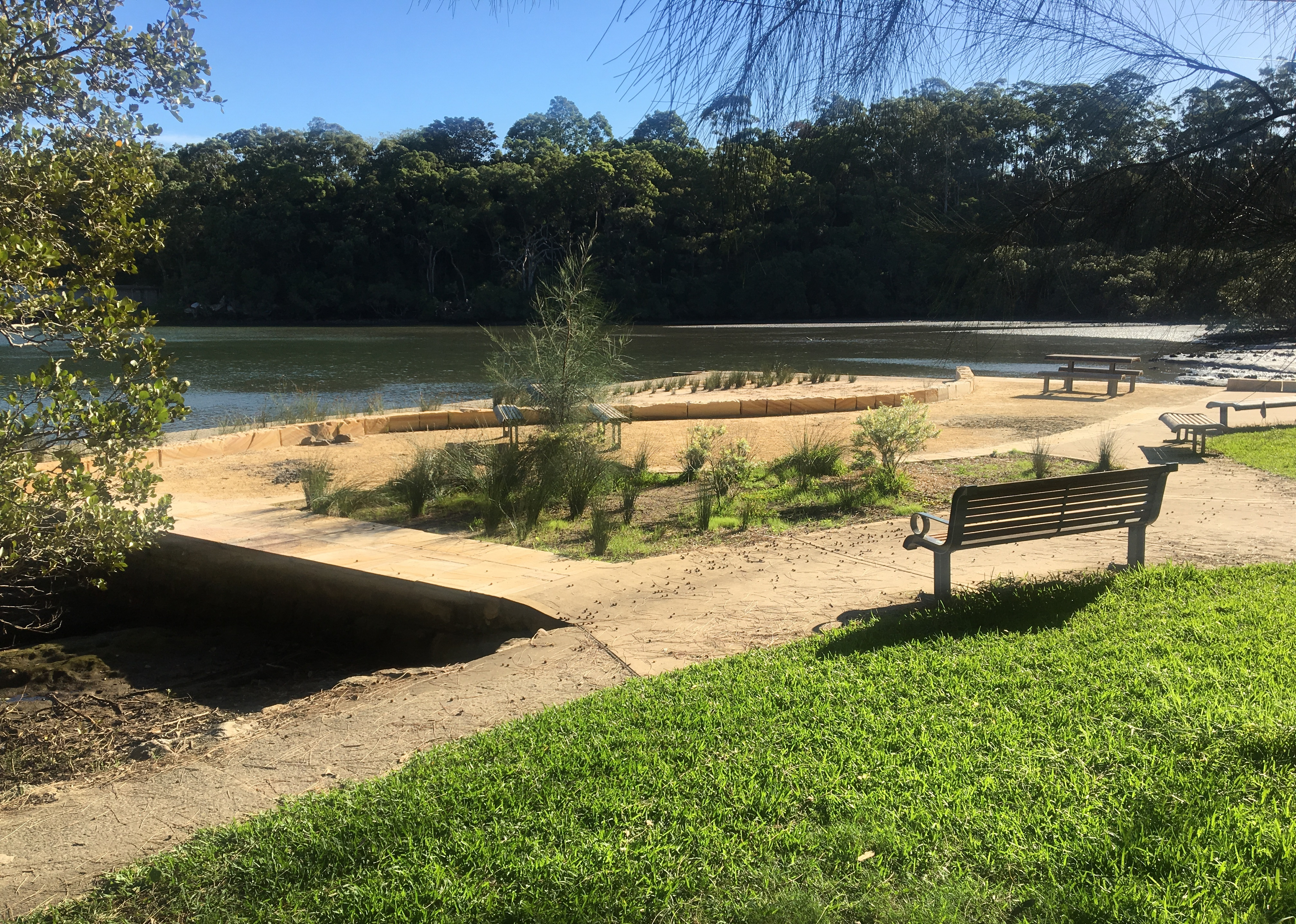
Foreshore park along Tambourine Bay in 2019

The park includes four benches and two tables, encouraging visitors to use the area for prolonged periods of time. Plants including Lomandra confertifolia and Baumea rubiginosa and other native Australian species were planted to blend into the surroundings both aesthetically and ecologically.

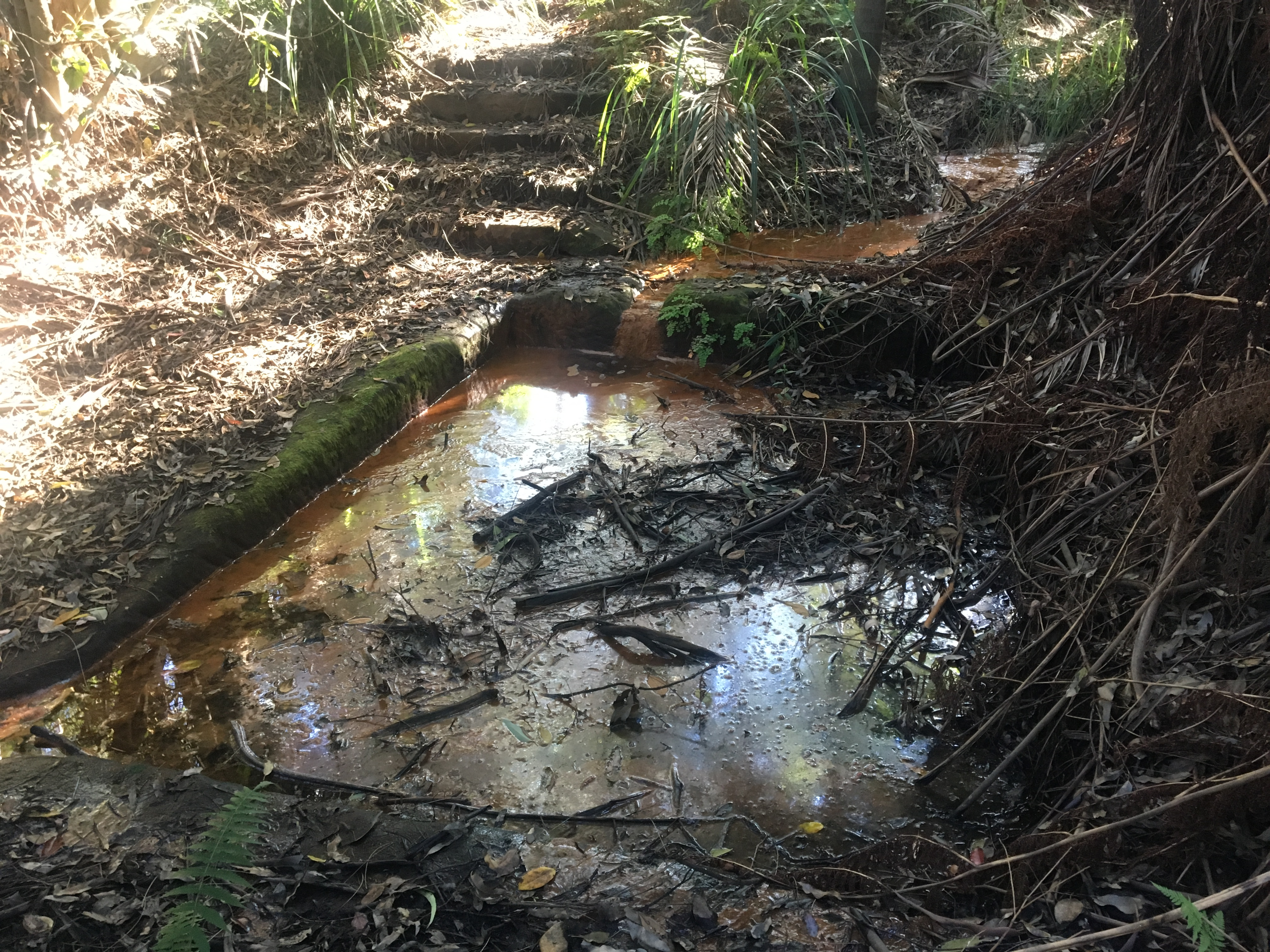
Tambourine Bay Well in April 2019

=== Tambourine Bay Well ===
Tambourine Bay Well was built in 1883 by Thomas Duckworth. The well was used to collect fresh water from the natural spring below. In the late 19th century people from surrounding areas such as Longueville and Hunters Hill would visit the site when necessary. The original structure was dug out of 1 metre of sandstone and later filled in after its decommissioning. The site was later rediscovered in 1991, however iron feeding algae has affected water purity.

== Recreational activities ==
=== Bushwalking ===
Approximately 740 metres of bush track extends from the St Ignatius’ College rowing shed on the western side of the bay to southern end of Tambourine Creek and into the Warraroon Reserve Walk along the bay's foreshore.

=== Events ===
Lane Cove's Food and Wine by the River is an annual festival held in Tambourine Bay Park in November. Since its inception in 2015, the event promotes the cold-climate food and wine of the Orange region. An animal farm display is also brought to the park as a way of showcases nuances of the region to visitors.

=== Dog park ===
Tambourine Bay Park is a registered off-leash dog park. This area is one of 17 off-leash spaces in the municipality of Lane Cove that was established with the aim of allowing "pets enjoy the great outdoors with their owners" whilst "native birds, lizards and mammals are not harmed".
