= Longueville, New South Wales =

Longueville
- Suburb
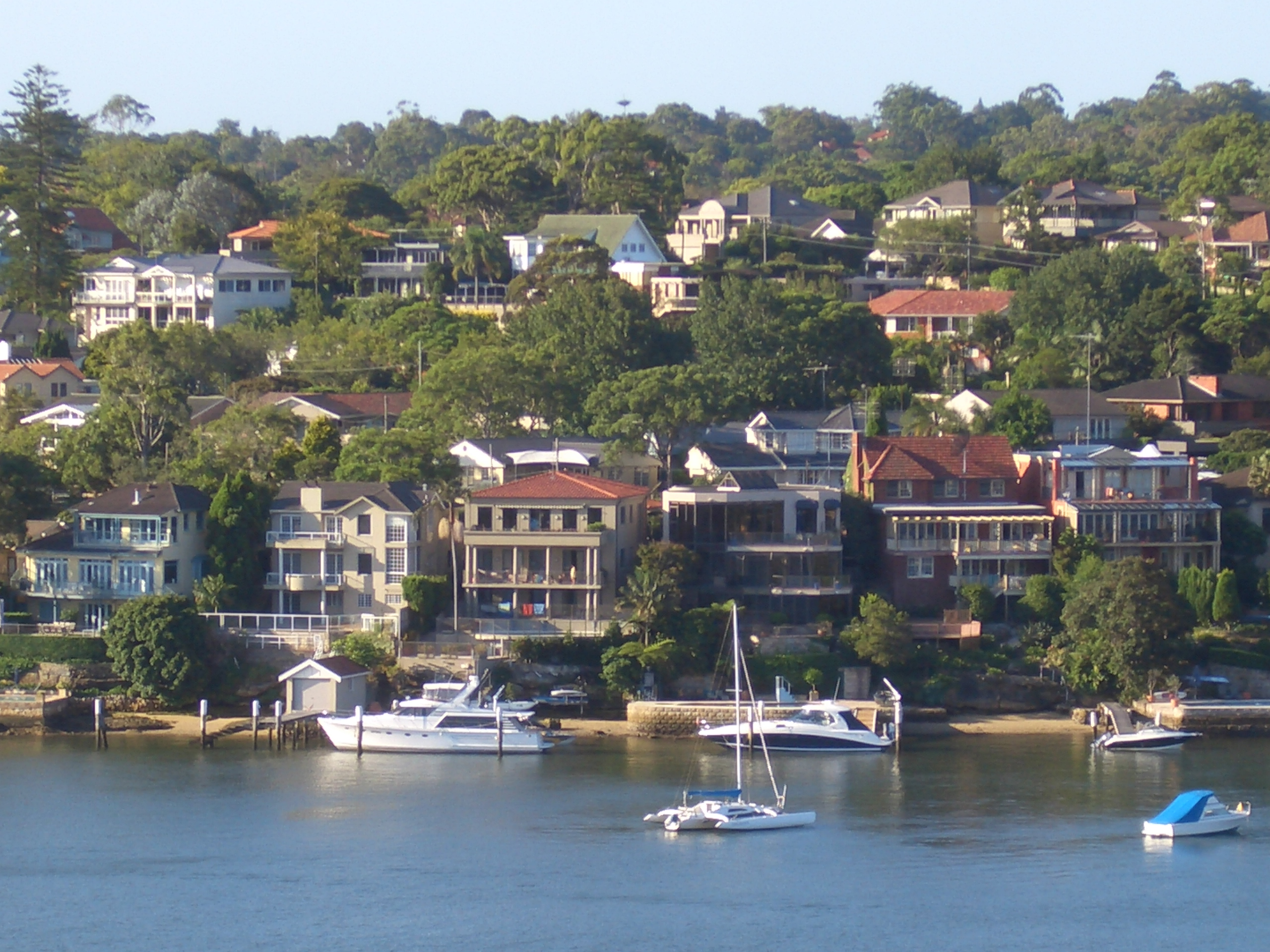
- Longueville as viewed from Hunters Hill

- Interactive map of Longueville
- Country: Australia
- State: New South Wales
- City: Sydney
- LGA: Municipality of Lane Cove
- Location: 8 km (5.0 mi) northwest of Sydney CBD
- Established: 1920s

Government
  - State electorate: Lane Cove
  - Federal division: Bennelong

Population
  - Total: 2,116 (SAL 2021)
- Postcode: 2066
Suburbs around Longueville
Lane Cove	Lane Cove	Lane Cove
Riverview	Longueville	Northwood
Hunters Hill	Hunters Hill	Woolwich

Longueville is a wealthy harbourside suburb on the Lower North Shore of Sydney, New South Wales, 8 kilometres north of the Sydney central business district, in the local government area of the Municipality of Lane Cove.

Longueville sits on the peninsula between Tambourine Bay and Woodford Bay, on the banks of the Lane Cove River. Originally a home to manufacturing industries, the suburb had its beginnings as a residential area in the 1870s. Longueville was officially proclaimed a suburb in the 1920s.

Before settlement, Longueville was the home of the Cammeraygal people of the Ku-ring-gai Aboriginal Tribe. The suburb has high house prices, in the top ten suburbs in Australia, with an average price of $6,346,000 as of August 2024.

== History ==
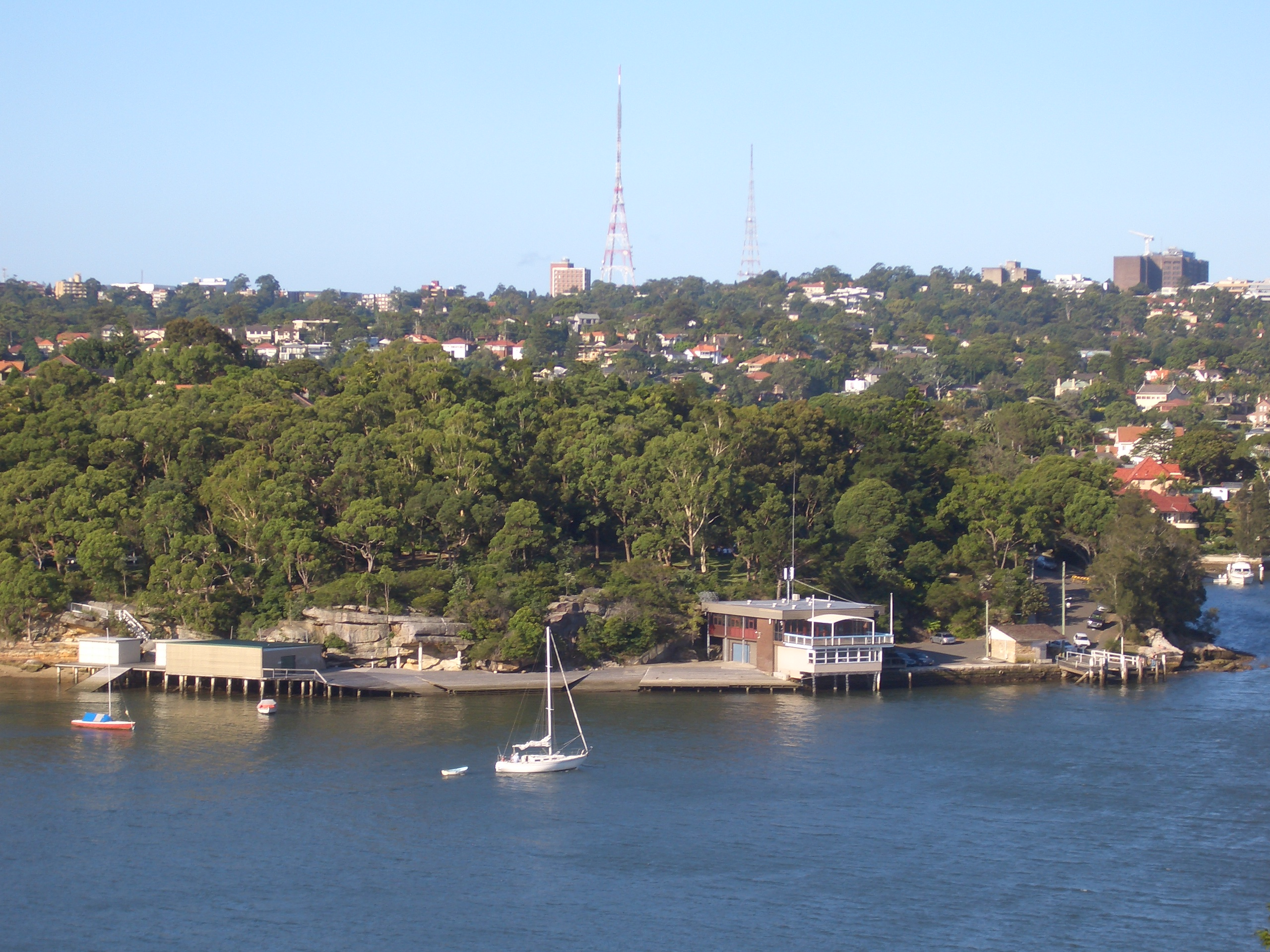
View from Hunters Hill

The area in which Longueville is was originally inhabited by the Cammeraygal Group of the Ku-ring-gai Aboriginal Tribe. The group, which inhabited the north shore of Port Jackson, was one of the largest in the Sydney area.

In 1831, the area that is now Longueville became home to one of the earliest manufacturing industries, with Rupert Kirk's soap and factory. Longueville had its beginnings in the 1870s, and at the time encompassed the Lane Cove area, which in turn was then part of Willoughby. By 1884, there were just two houses in the area, owned by Joseph Palmer and Henry Lamb. Richard Hayes Harnett, a land speculator, later acquired some of the land and subdivided it into home sites. He later became the first mayor of Mosman.

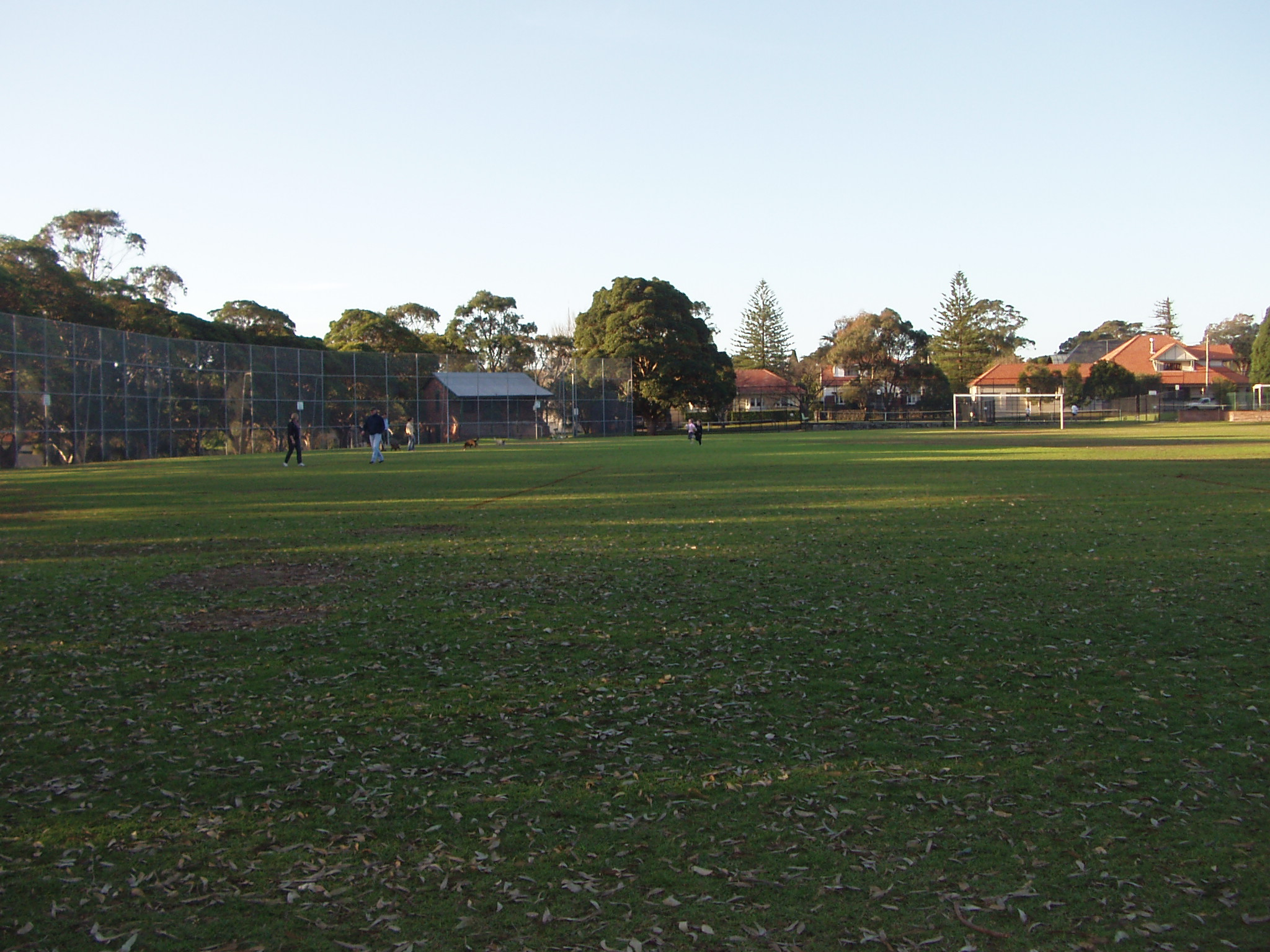
Kingsford Smith Oval

There is some conjecture about where the name Longueville originated, however a commonly held belief is that the suburb was named after French nobleman, the Duc de Longueville. The main streets are said to have been named after his three daughters, Christina, Lucretia and Arabella. A related theory is that the name bears a connection to the Château de Châteaudun which possesses both a Longueville wing and a Dunois wing, with Dunois being the name of one of the principal streets in Longueville.

== Transport ==
Longueville wharf is served by Captain Cook Cruises ferry services. Busways route 261 operates to Lane Cove and King Street Wharf.

== Sport and Recreation ==
Adult and junior skiff sailing races occur regularly at the Lane Cove 12ft Sailing Skiff Club located at the end of the Longueville peninsula.

== Houses ==
In 2011, the majority of dwellings were detached houses (99.1%) with some varied architectural styles, including stately Victorian-style homes, Federation styles, Californian bungalows, weatherboard cottages, and contemporary waterfront houses.

Longueville has some of Sydney's highest property prices with a median property price of $5.41 million as of May 2024 according to allhomes.com.au, having climbed from the eighth most expensive at $2.23 million in 2011, positioning it as one of Sydney's most prestigious suburbs. In the past few years, the suburb has seen many new homes being constructed and older houses undergoing extensive renovations. Norfolk Road holds the record for the highest sale price achieved at auction in the suburb.

== Demographics ==
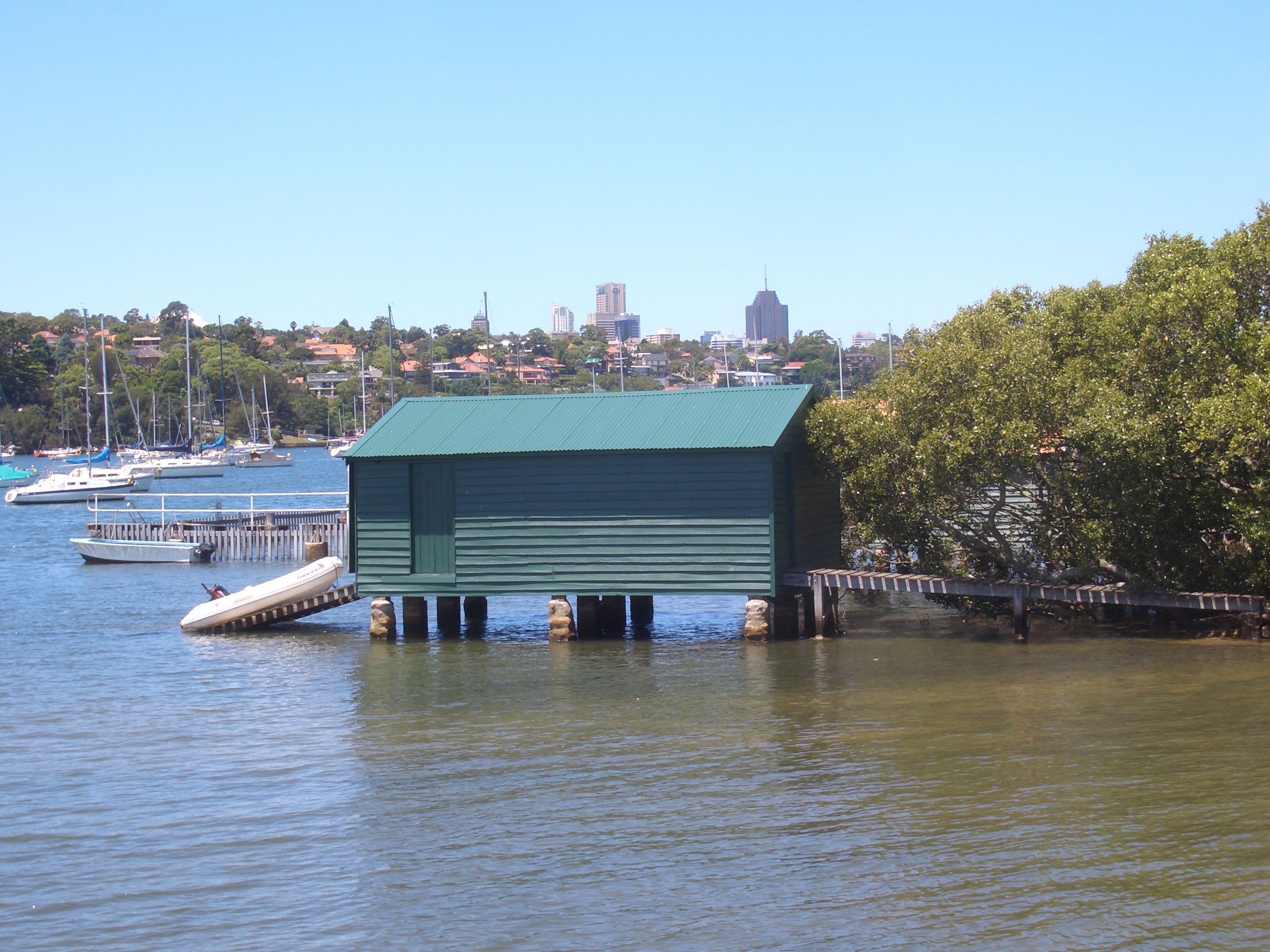
Woodford Bay

In the 2021 Census, the population of Longueville stood at 2,116 people, 50.7% identified as female and 49.3% identified as male, with a median age of 46 years. 11.9% of the population was born overseas with England (4.8%), China (excluding SARs and Taiwan) (2.2%), New Zealand (1.8%), Hong Kong (SAR of China) (1.7%) and Malaysia (1.4%) being the most common countries of birth identified. The five strongest religious affiliations in the area were in descending order: Catholic (37.8%), No Religion, so described (28.9%), Anglican (14.2%), Eastern Orthodox (3.7%) and 2.6% of respondents elected not to disclose their religion.

Longueville's population is notably affluent, with a median weekly household income of A$4,894, compared with $1,746 in Australia. The most common types of occupation for employed persons were Professionals (43.5%), Managers (25.0%), Clerical and Administrative Workers (11.7%), Community and Personal Service Workers (5.8%), Sales Workers (5.7%), Technicians and Trades Workers (3.7%), Labourers (2.4%) and Machinery Operators and Drivers (0.3%). 89.8% of the suburbs occupied private dwellings were family households, 9.5% were lone person households and 0.8% were group households. 98.8% of private dwellings in the Longueville area were separate houses and 1.7% were flats or apartments.

=== Notable residents ===
Notable former and current residents of Longueville include:

- Marjorie Barnard - novelist
- Pamela Clauss - NYC-based pioneering surgical nurse and philanthropist
- Louisa Dunkley - Union leader and feminist
- Antonia Kidman - journalist, television host
- Nicole Kidman - actress
- Rose Lindsay - artist's model, printmaker, author and wife of Norman Lindsay
- John Newcombe - tennis player
- Patrick O'Farrell - historian of Catholic Australia
- Brett Whiteley - artist
- Geoffrey Robertson - Barrister

== Politics ==
Longueville was in the formerly safe Liberal federal electoral division of North Sydney, electing an independent MP in 2022. Former Liberal Party Federal Treasurer Joe Hockey represented the seat from 1996 and was replaced by Liberal MP Trent Zimmerman at the 2015 North Sydney by-election. Zimmerman was the first openly gay man to be elected to the House of Representatives and was re-elected at the 2016 federal election. North Sydney was one of only two original divisions in New South Wales, along with Wentworth, which have never been held by the Australian Labor Party. In 2022 Kylea Tink was elected as part of a wave of 'teal' independents that were elected in that year's federal election, unseating many Liberal MPs. An independent won in the division of North Sydney despite losing this Longueville polling place in both the first-preference and two-candidate preferred vote. Since 2025, Longueville has been in Bennelong, represented by Jerome Laxale of the Labor Party.

For NSW state elections, Longueville is in the Electoral district of Lane Cove. Since 2003, this seat has been held by Liberal MP Anthony Roberts, a former minister in the state government.

Federal Election 2022 (Note: Displayed are first-preference votes only.) Longueville Polling Booth
Liberal	48.65%
Independent	26.19%
Labor	15.50%
The Greens	4.86%
United Australia Party	1.62%
Liberal Democrats	1.32%
TNL	0.66%
Sustainable Australia Party - Stop Overdevelopment / Corruption	0.60%
One Nation	0.42%
Informed Medical Options Party	0.18%

State Election 2023 (Note: Displayed are first-preference votes only.) Longueville Polling Booth
Liberal	45.07%
Labor	23.95%
Independent	20.38%
The Greens NSW	8.32%
Sustainable Australia Party - Stop Overdevelopment / Corruption	2.28%
