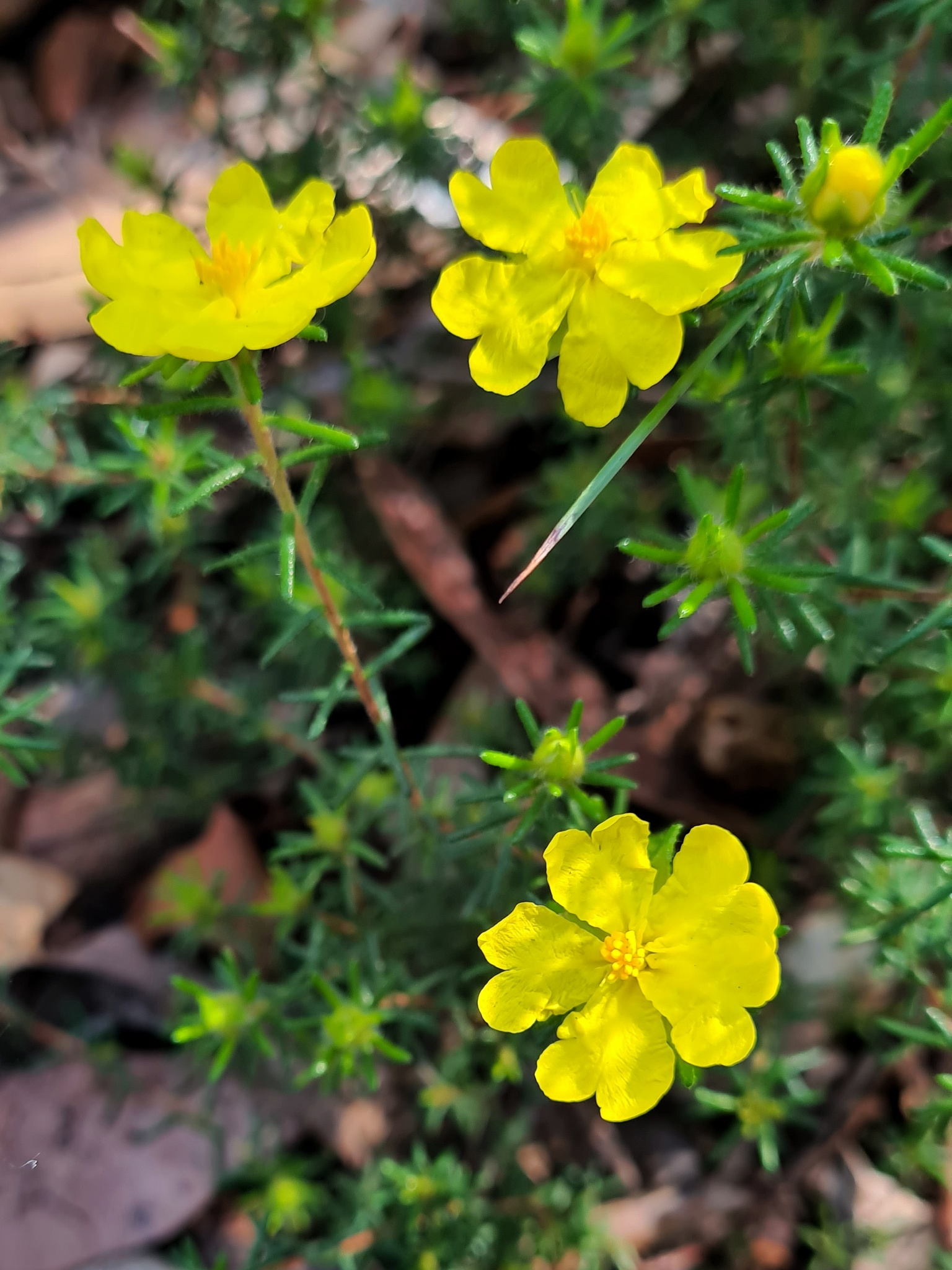

Conservation status
- Critically endangered (EPBC Act)

Scientific classification
- Kingdom: Plantae
- Clade: Tracheophytes
- Clade: Angiosperms
- Clade: Eudicots
- Order: Dilleniales
- Family: Dilleniaceae
- Genus: Hibbertia
- Species: H. spanantha

Binomial name
- Hibbertia spanantha Hellmut R. Toelken & A.F.Rob.

= Hibbertia spanantha =

Julian's hibbertia

Species of flowering plant

Hibbertia spanantha, also known as Julian's hibbertia, is a species of flowering plant in the family Dilleniaceae, and is endemic to New South Wales. It is a small, low-lying to sprawling shrub with linear leaves and single yellow flowers on the ends of the stems with thirteen stamens on one side of two hairy carpels.

== Description ==
Hibbertia spanantha is a low-lying to sprawling shrub that typically grows to a height of up to about 30 cm (12 in) and has hairy branchlets. The leaves are linear, 4–8 mm (0.16–0.31 in) long and up to 1 mm (0.039 in) wide on a short petiole. The flowers are arranged on the ends of the stems and are sessile with linear bracts 4.6–5.3 mm (0.18–0.21 in) long. The sepals are joined at the base, the outer lobes 5.8–6.6 mm (0.23–0.26 in) long, 1.9–2.6 mm (0.075–0.102 in) wide, the inner lobes shorter but broader. The petals are yellow, egg-shaped with the narrower end towards the base, and 6.6–8.3 mm (0.26–0.33 in) long with thirteen to fifteen stamens on one side of two hairy carpels, each carpel with four ovules. Flowering mainly occurs from September to November.

== Taxonomy ==
Hibbertia spanantha was first formally described in 2015 by Hellmut R. Toelken and A.F. Robinson in the Journal of the Adelaide Botanic Gardens from specimens Robinson collected in South Turramurra in 2012. The specific epithet (spanantha) means "few-flowered" and the common name honours Julian Poulton who inspired Robinson to become an ecologist.

== Distribution and habitat ==
Julian's hibbertia is presently only known from near Lucas Heights and Glenorie but has been recorded in other parts of the Lane Cove River catchment and grows in the understorey of grassy forest.

== Conservation status ==
This hibbertia is listed as "critically endangered" under the Australian Government Environment Protection and Biodiversity Conservation Act 1999 and the New South Wales Government Biodiversity Conservation Act 2016. The main threats to the species include its small population size and limited distribution, trampling and inappropriate fire regimes.

Efforts have been made to translocate the species. Plants have been propagated from cuttings since no seeds were available, and in autumn 2015, plants were grown near the parent plants in Sydney Turpentine-Ironbark Forest. The translocated plants produced flowers or flower buds, but by 2016, all had died.
