= Gore Creek =

Gore Creek may refer to the following watercourses:

in Australia

- Gore Creek (New South Wales)

in the United States

- Gore Creek (Colorado)
- Gore Creek (North Carolina) in North Carolina
- Gore Creek (Oregon) in Oregon
