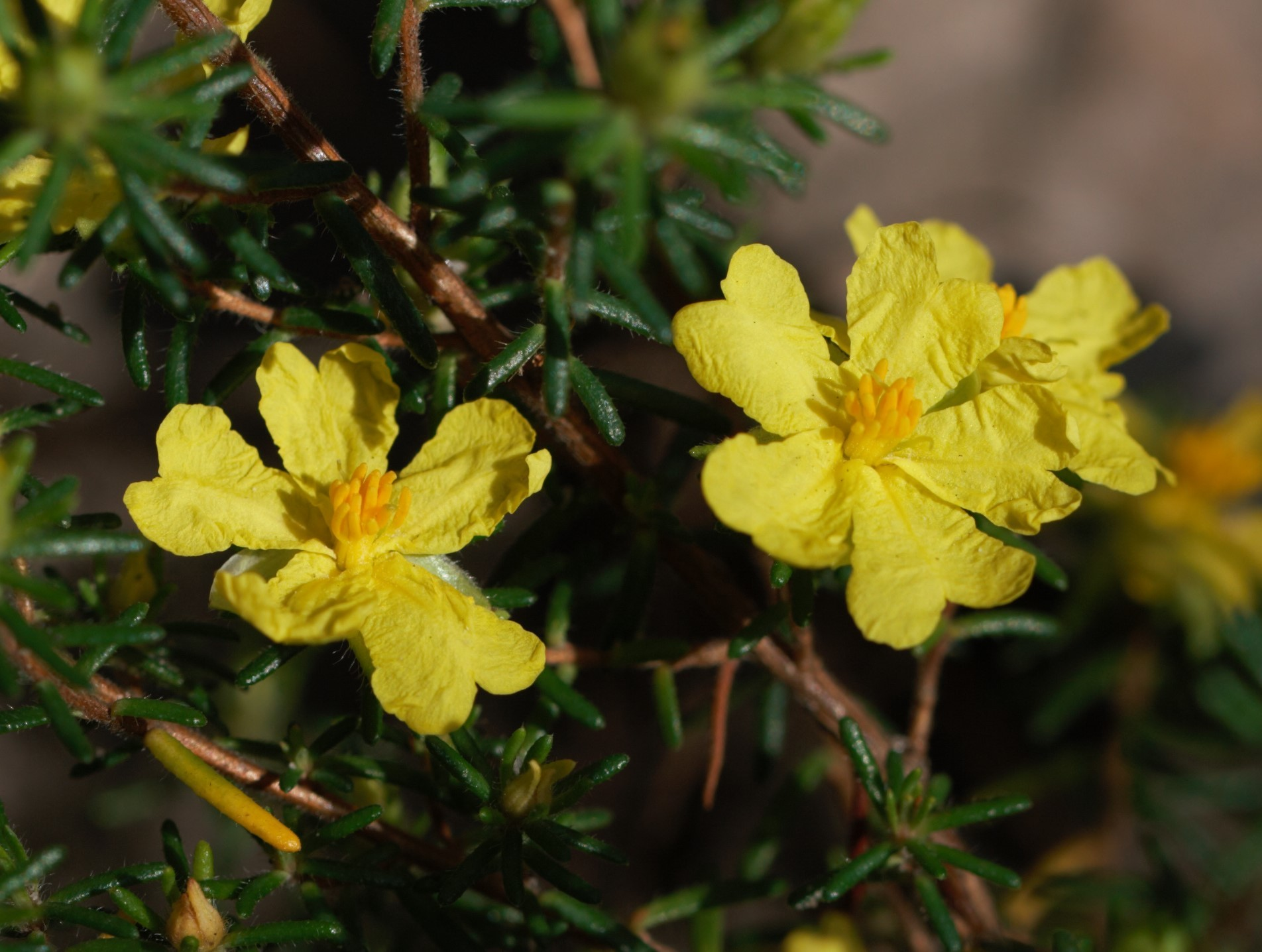
- Near Devlins Creek, Cheltenham

Scientific classification
- Kingdom: Plantae
- Clade: Tracheophytes
- Clade: Angiosperms
- Clade: Eudicots
- Order: Dilleniales
- Family: Dilleniaceae
- Genus: Hibbertia
- Species: H. puberula

Binomial name
- Hibbertia puberula Toelken

= Hibbertia puberula =

Species of plant

Hibbertia puberula is a species of flowering plant in the family Dilleniaceae and is endemic to New South Wales. It is a small shrub with softly-hairy foliage, narrow egg-shaped to almost linear leaves, and yellow flowers usually arranged on singly short side shoots with ten to fourteen stamens on one side of two carpels.

== Description ==
Hibbertia puberula is a small shrub with a few wiry branches up to 30 cm (12 in) long and with softly-hairy foliage. The leaves are narrow egg-shaped to almost linear, mostly 3.0–5.5 mm (0.12–0.22 in) long, 0.8–1.4 mm (0.031–0.055 in) wide on a petiole 0.2–0.5 mm (0.0079–0.0197 in) long and with the edges rolled under. The flowers are usually arranged singly on the ends of short side-shoot with leaf-like bracts mostly 3.0–3.5 mm (0.12–0.14 in) long at the base. The five sepals are joined at the base, the outer sepal lobes egg-shaped and more or less beaked with the edges rolled under near the tip, 6–10 mm (0.24–0.39 in) long, the inner sepal lobes mostly 5–7 mm (0.20–0.28 in) long. The five petals are yellow, egg-shaped with the narrower end towards the base, 6–8 mm (0.24–0.31 in) long and there are ten to fourteen stamens fused together at the base on one side of the two carpels, each carpel with four to six ovules. Flowering mainly occurs from October to November.

== Taxonomy ==
Hibbertia puberula was first formally described in 2010 by Hellmut R. Toelken in the Journal of the Adelaide Botanic Gardens from specimens collected at Yowie Bay in 1908 by Arthur Andrew Hamilton. The specific epithet (puberula) means "minutely pubescent", referring to the few soft, simple hairs on the leaves and ovary.

In a 2012 edition of the same journal, Toelken described three subspecies and the names are accepted by the Australian Plant Census:

- Hibbertia puberula subsp. extensa R.T.Mill. usually has six or seven stamens;
- Hibbertia puberula subsp. glabrescens Toelken usually has ten to fourteen stamens with the anthers 0.9–1.3 mm (0.035–0.051 in) long;
- Hibbertia puberula Toelken subsp. puberula usually has ten to fourteen stames with the anthers 1.3–2.1 mm (0.051–0.083 in) long.

== Distribution and habitat ==
This hibbertia grows in sandy soil over sandstone in the Sydney basin. Subspecies extensa mostly grows on rock shelves near the upper Georges River and on the Central Coast, subspecies glabrescens is only known from near Bankstown Airport and subspecies puberula grows in a range of habitats near Sydney and in Morton National Park.

== Conservation status ==
Hibbertia puberula subsp. glabrescens is only known from about 100 mature plants and is listed as "critically endangered" under the Australian Government Environment Protection and Biodiversity Conservation Act 1999 and the New South Wales Government Biodiversity Conservation Act 2016.

== See also ==
- List of Hibbertia species
