= Devlins Creek =

River in Australia

Coordinates: 33°46′00″S 151°04′20″E

Devlins
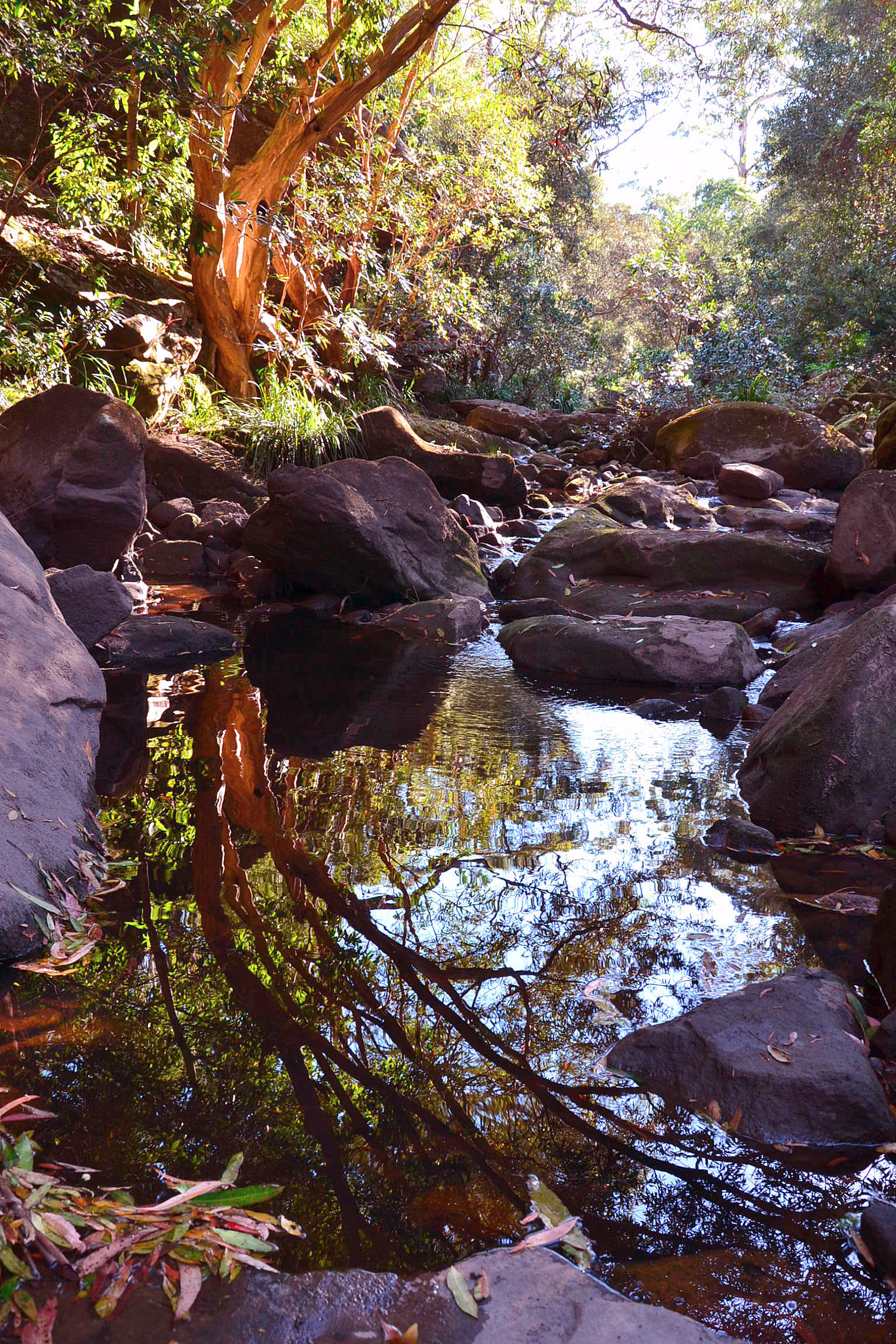
- Etymology: In honour of James Devlin (1807–1875), a landowner and trustee of the Field of Mars Common

Location
- Country: Australia
- State: New South Wales
- Region: Sydney basin (IBRA), Northern Suburbs
- Local government area: Hornsby, City of Parramatta

Physical characteristics
- Source
  - location: Westleigh
- Mouth: confluence with Terrys Creek to form the Lane Cove River
  - location: North Epping
- Length: 7 km (4.3 mi)

Basin features
- River system: Parramatta River catchment
- National park: Lane Cove NP

Devlins Creek, an urban watercourse that is part of the Parramatta River catchment, is located in Northern Suburbs region of Sydney, Australia.

== Course and features ==
Devlins Creek rises about 3 kilometres (1.9 mi) south south-west of the suburb of Westleigh; with its headwaters forming the watershed boundary between the Hornsby Plateau and the Cumberland Plain. The creek flows generally east before reaching its confluence with Terrys Creek to form the Lane Cove River, north-east of the suburb of North Epping, in Lane Cove National Park. The course of the creek is approximately 7 kilometres (4.3 mi).

Devlins Creek is transversed by the Cumberland Highway, the M2 Hills Motorway, the Beecroft Road, and the Main North railway line. A bridge over the Devlins Creek, constructed in 1935, is listed on the New South Wales Heritage Register.

Devlins Creek, or sometimes recorded incorrectly as Devlin's Creek, is named in honour of James Devlin (1807–1875), a wealthy landowner and trustee of the Field of Mars Common.

== See also ==
- Great North Walk
- Great North Road
- Lane Cove National Park
- Rivers of New South Wales
