= Scout Creek =

River in Australia

- Map of Greater Metropolitan Sydney, with the location of the mouth of the Scout Creek, as marked
- Etymology: Derived from the Baden Powell Scout Training Camp, located adjacent to the creek.

Location
- Country: Australia
- State: New South Wales
- Region: Sydney basin (IBRA), Northern Suburbs
- LGAs: Hornsby

Physical characteristics
- Source
  - location: Pennant Hills
  - coordinates: 33°44′09″S 151°04′35″E
- Mouth: confluence with the Lane Cove River
  - location: between Pennant Hills and South Turramurra
  - coordinates: 33°45′12″S 151°06′2″E
- Length: 1.8 km (1.1 mi)

Basin features
- River system: Parramatta River catchment
- National park: Lane Cove NP

Scout Creek is an urban gully, is located in Hornsby Shire local government area of Sydney, New South Wales, Australia. It is part of the Parramatta River catchment.

== Course and features ==
Scout Creek rises on the southern side of the intersection of Paling Street and Pennant Hills Road, in the suburb of Pennant Hills; with its headwaters forming the watershed boundary between the Hornsby Plateau and the Cumberland Plain. The creek flows generally south-east by south, through the Baden Powell Scout Training Camp and Pennant Hills Park, before reaching its confluence with the Lane Cove River, between Pennant Hills and South Turramurra, in the Lane Cove National Park. The course of the creek is approximately 1.8 kilometres (1.1 mi).

Scout Creek was formerly known as 'Boy Scout Creek' from when the Boy Scout Camp site was opened in 1927, adjacent to the creek. The name was locally changed to 'Scout Creek' in the 1960s when the term 'Boy' was removed from the title of the Scouts Association.

== See also ==
- Great North Walk
- Great North Road
- Lane Cove National Park
- Rivers of New South Wales
