= Epping, New South Wales =

Epping
- Suburb
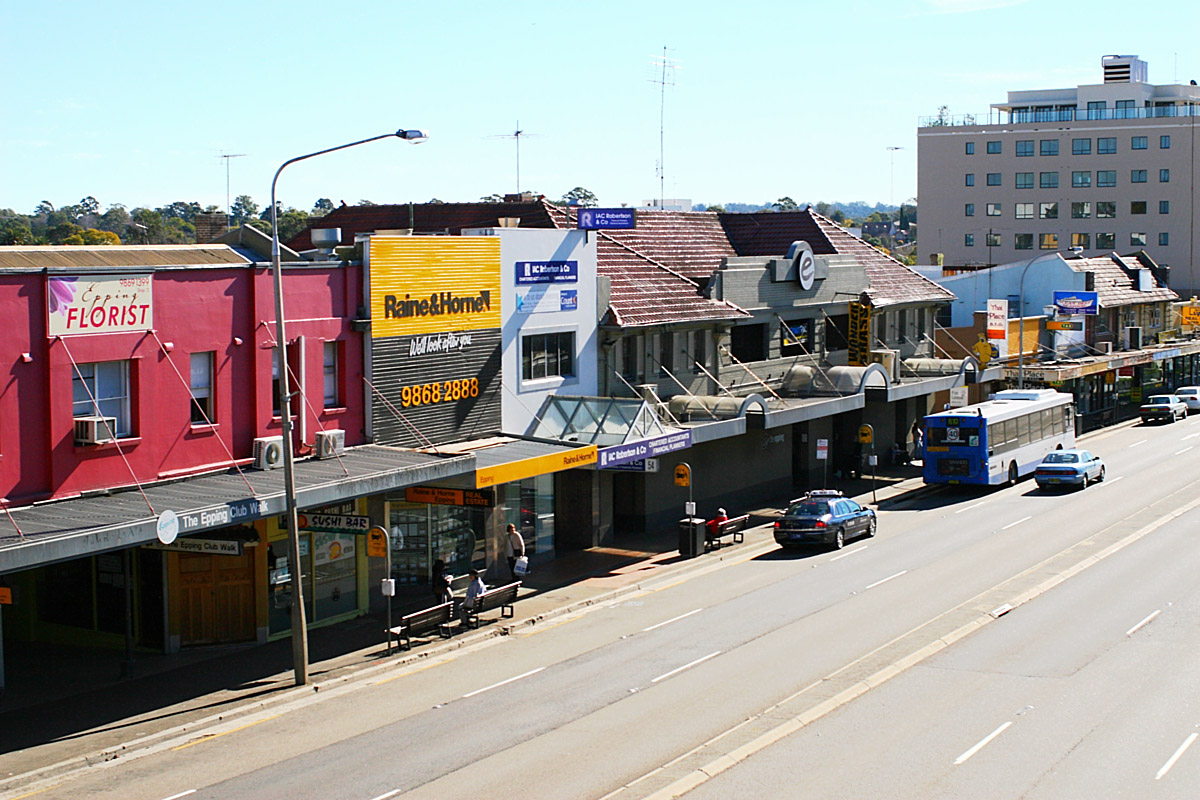
- Beecroft Road, Epping

- Interactive map of Epping
- Coordinates: 33°46′29″S 151°04′44″E
- Country: Australia
- State: New South Wales
- Region: Northern Sydney
- City: Sydney
- LGA: City of Parramatta
- Location: 18 km (11 mi) north-west of Sydney CBD
- Established: 1899

Government
  - State electorates: Epping; Ryde
  - Federal divisions: Berowra; Parramatta

Area
  - Total: 6.84 km^{2} (2.64 sq mi)
- Elevation: 98 m (322 ft)

Population
  - Total: 29,551 (2021 census)
  - Density: 4,320/km^{2} (11,190/sq mi)
- Time zone: UTC+10 (AEST)
  - Summer (DST): UTC+11 (AEDT)
- Postcode: 2121
Suburbs around Epping
Beecroft	Cheltenham	North Epping
Carlingford	Epping	Marsfield
Eastwood	Eastwood	Marsfield

Epping is a suburb of Sydney, in the Australian state of New South Wales, 18 kilometres (11 mi) north-west of the Sydney central business district in the local government area of the City of Parramatta. Epping is in the Northern Sydney region. The suburb is the most north-eastern area of the City of Parramatta. North Epping is a separate suburb to the north and under a different council, Hornsby Shire.

== History ==
The Wallumettagal Aboriginal tribe lived in the area between the Lane Cove River and Parramatta River. In 1792, Governor Arthur Phillip began the granting of parcels of lands to marines, and the area was referred to on Phillip's maps as the Field of Mars, Mars being the Roman god of war. It contained the area of what is now Epping, along with the surrounding suburbs of Ryde and Marsfield.

Epping railway station was opened on 17 September 1886, originally named "Field of Mars", and quickly renamed to "Carlingford" on 5 April 1887. The Post Office was opened on 16 October 1889, originally named "East Carlingford".

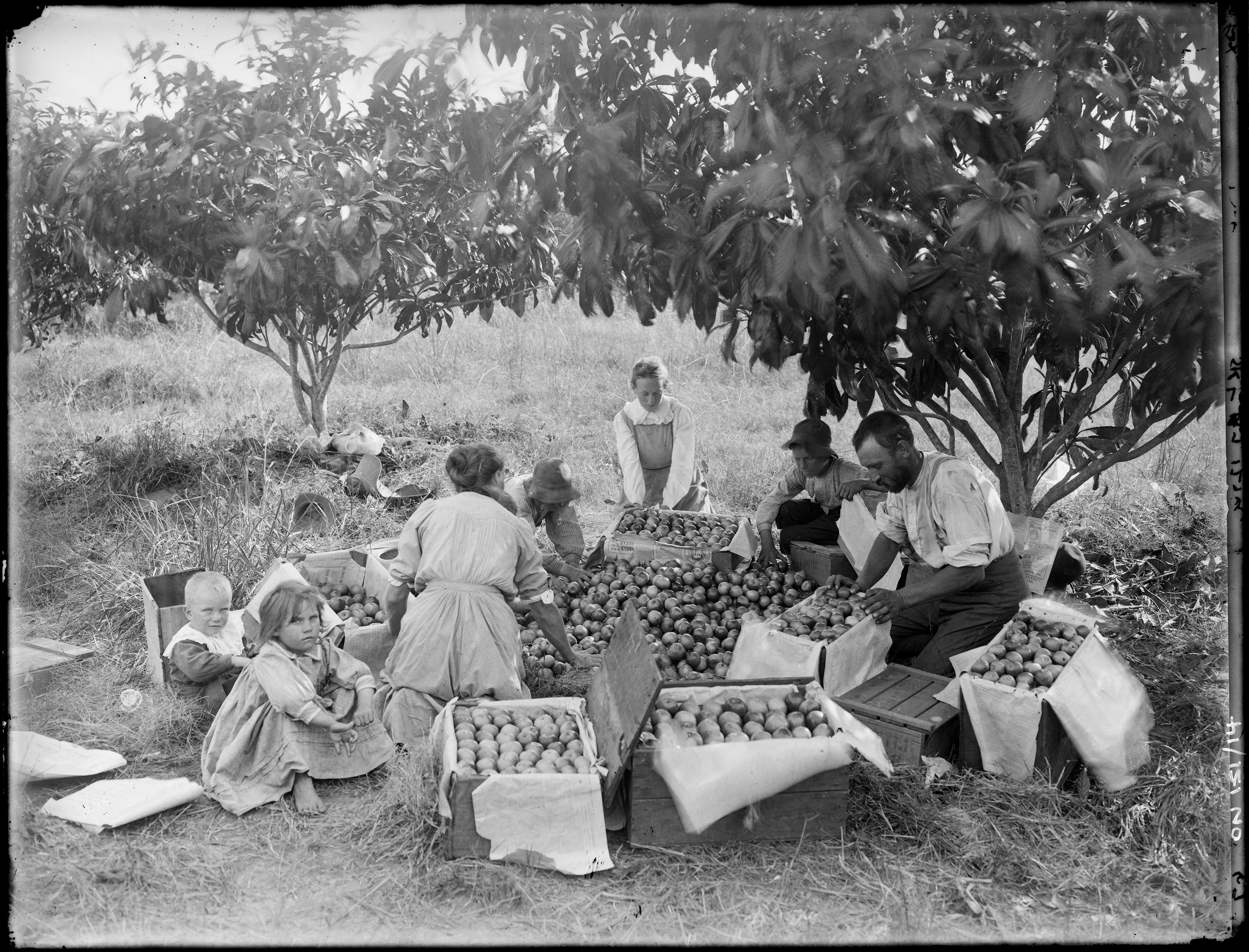
Sonter family packing fruit, Ray Road, Epping, Sydney, 1911

In 1899 the suburb name of Epping was adopted following the suggestion by a local landowner William Midson (1849–1924), after a town near Epping Forest in Essex, where his father was born. At this time, the names of the post office and the railway station were both changed to Epping. The land from the Field of Mars was broken up into farms and orchards, and after World War II it started to convert to residential use. Areas which had previously been reserved as part of the green belt scheme became available in 1948.

The post-war period saw suburban development as Sydney’s population grew, with many people moving to the outer suburbs. The extension of the railway line from Sydney to Epping in the 1950s played a key role in connecting the suburb to the city, encouraging more people to settle there. It evolved into a more suburbanised, diverse community. The area became increasingly attractive to professionals due to its convenient public transport links, proximity to employment centres and schools.

The Seven Network had its headquarters and television production studios in Epping until 2009. The site is now Meriton Epping Park residential complex.

Until 2016, parts of Epping were under three different councils: Hornsby Shire, City of Ryde and City of Parramatta. A 2015 review of local government boundaries recommended that all of Epping be amalgamated into the City of Parramatta, and this became effective on 12 May 2016.

On 26 May 2019, a new metro station along the North West Rail Link was opened in Epping.

== Commercial area ==
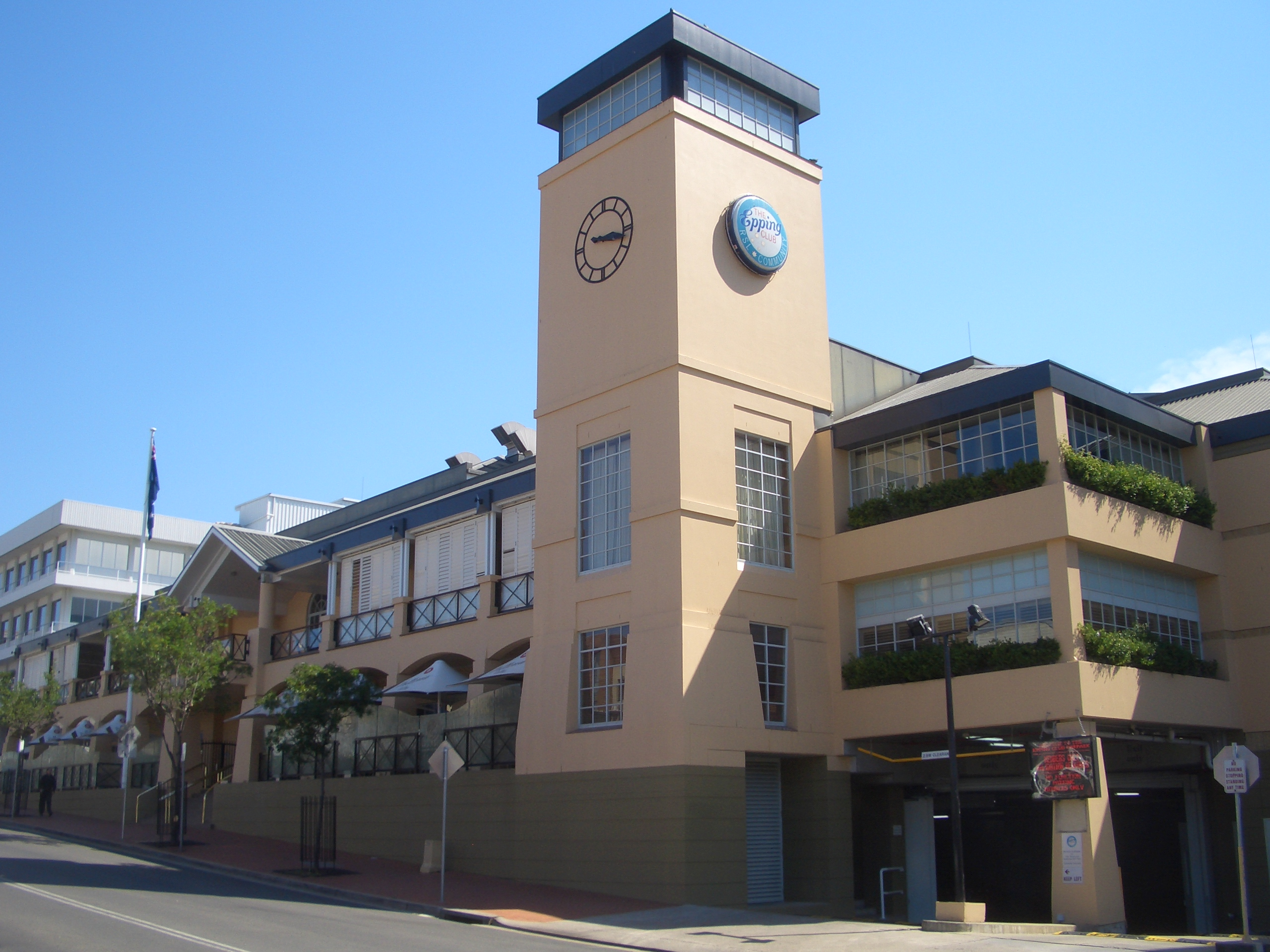
Epping Club

Lands around Epping Railway Station are zoned for commercial use. There are businesses including newsagencies, pharmacies, Asian grocers and restaurants. To the west of the station, there is a Coles supermarket, a RSL Club and a pub (the Epping Hotel) on Rawson Street.

=== Redevelopment as "Urban Renewal Area" ===
A major re-development of the Epping Town Centre is planned as part of the NSW government's "Urban Renewal Area" programme (originally called the "Urban Activation Precincts" programme). The changes to zoning for this programme cover 54 hectares, including provision for building heights of 8 to 22 storeys (although later proposals are up to 36 stories) for mixed commercial and residential use within a 400-metre radius of the railway station, and about 3,750 additional homes within 800 metres of it. These zoning changes were finalized and approved in March 2014, although residents have expressed concerns about issues including traffic management, lack of parking, storm water drainage and access to schools.

The first major project under this programme was scheduled to be Grocon's amalgamation of four lots at 30-42 Oxford Street, acquired in September 2015 for a cost of $56 million. Plans for a 16-storey development of more than 250 apartments for a total value of more than $300 million were lodged with the council. However, in early 2016 they sold the blocks. In late 2019, the "Oxford Central" development of 251 or 252 apartments, car parking and retail was completed on the site by developer Greaton and construction company Ceerose.

== Transport ==
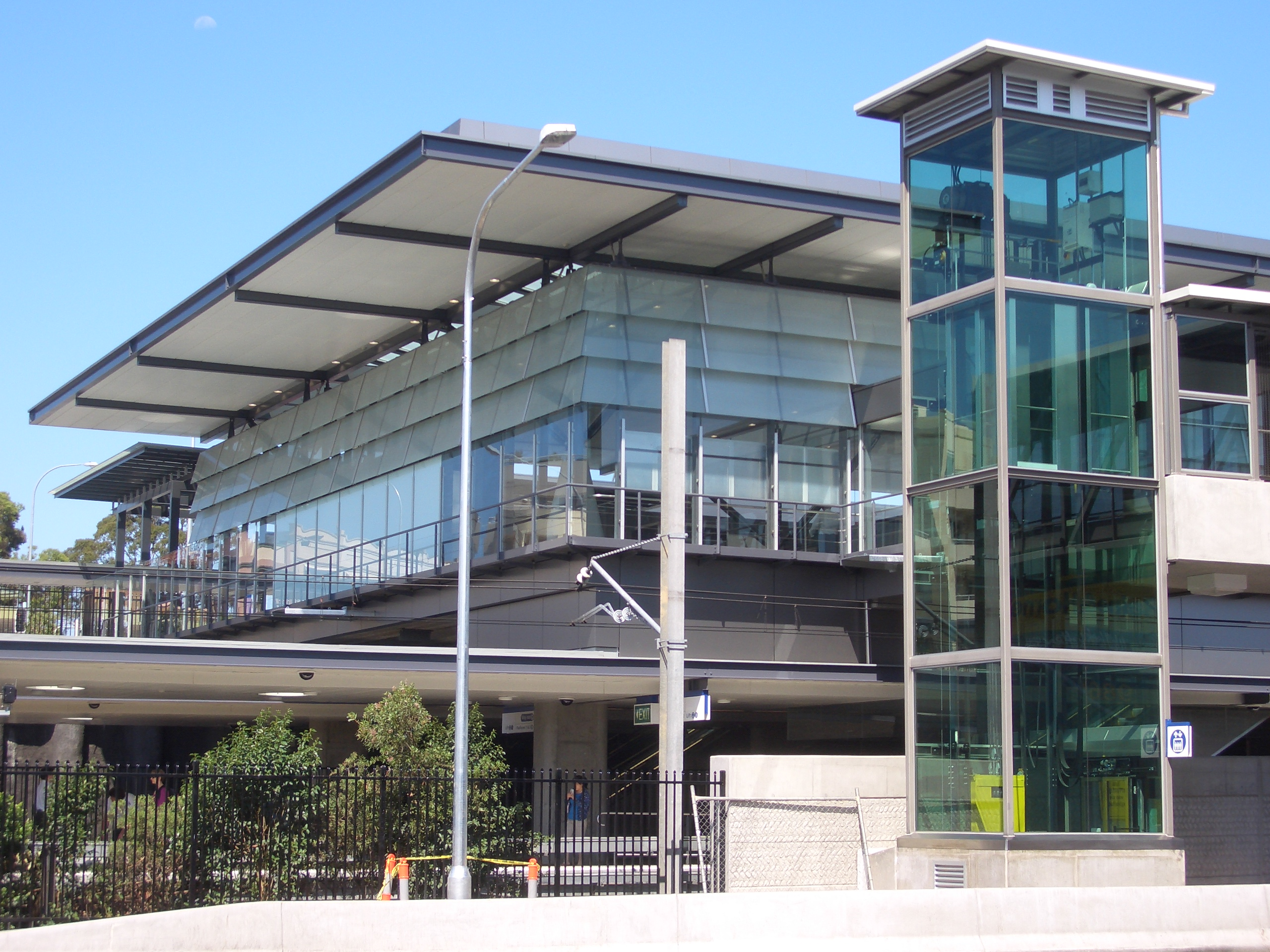
Epping railway station

Epping railway station is a junction station on the Northern Line of the Sydney Trains network, the Central Coast & Newcastle Line of the NSW TrainLink network, and the rapid transit Sydney Metro Northwest since its opening on 26 May 2019. Prior to conversion into the Sydney Metro Northwest, the Epping to Chatswood rail link originally carried Sydney Trains suburban services from its opening in 2009.

Bus services are operated by Busways and CDC NSW. The M2 Hills Motorway runs along the northern border to the Sydney central business district. Epping Road is a major arterial road in the area that runs east from the railway station to the Pacific Highway.

== Community facilities ==
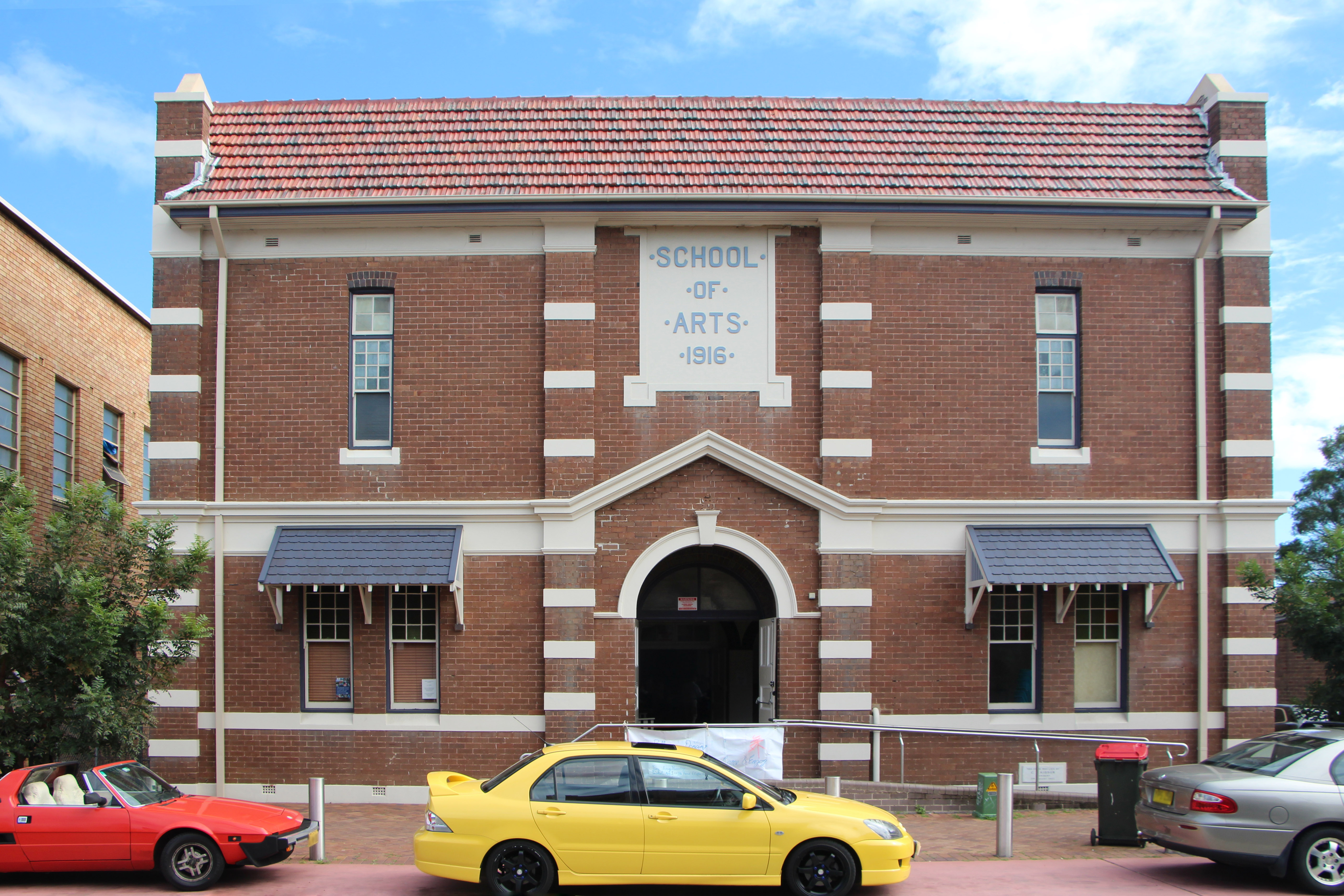
Epping Community Centre, originally known as the School of Arts

The council and other organisations provide a number of community facilities. These include:

- Epping Aquatic and Leisure Centre (also known as Dence Park Aquatic Centre) off 26 Stanley Road, features a heated 26 °C (79 °F) outdoor 50-metre pool, a warmer heated 31 °C (88 °F) "learn to swim" pool, a covered toddlers' play pool, a gymnasium and a kiosk/coffee shop. A range of classes and training is held at the centre.
- Epping Branch Library, at 1 Chambers Court (off Pembroke Street) is a branch of City of Parramatta Library and formerly a branch of Hornsby Shire Library. Membership is free and provides access to a wide range of services.
- West Epping Community Centre is on the corner of Dent and Downing Streets, beside West Epping Park and Oval. Capacity: 100 people. Attached to the Community Centre is the West Epping Community Preschool which shares the two enclosed playgrounds.
- Epping Community Centre at 9 Oxford Street, near the railway station. Capacity: 300 people (all areas combined). Formerly known as the Epping School of Arts, the community centre was designed by Lord Livingstone Ramsay, an architect who was President of Hornsby Shire from 1909 until 1913. It was built in three stages between 1906 and 1916, and officially opened in 1909. The building has a large auditorium with a stage, two meeting rooms, a commercial standard kitchen, and a second smaller hall downstairs.
- Epping Leisure and Learning Centre at 1 Chambers Court (off Pembroke Street), downstairs from the Epping Branch Library. Capacity: 100 people.
- Epping Creative Centre at 26 Stanley Road, beside the entrance to Dence Park Aquatic Centre. Capacity: 100 people. This centre has an emphasis on creative and educational leisure activities. Epping Creative Centre was opened in September 1989, originally in the back rooms of the Dence Park building, then in 1999 the council granted full use of the premises.
- Epping YMCA at 15 Ward Street caters for the diverse ages, interests and abilities of the surrounding community. In 2012, a million-dollar redevelopment saw the family centre substantially modernised. Facilities include a health club, group fitness studio, one-court indoor stadium, community program room, international standard gymnastics arena, and tennis courts.

Some schools and churches also have halls and other facilities that can be made available for community uses.

=== Parks, playgrounds, sports fields ===
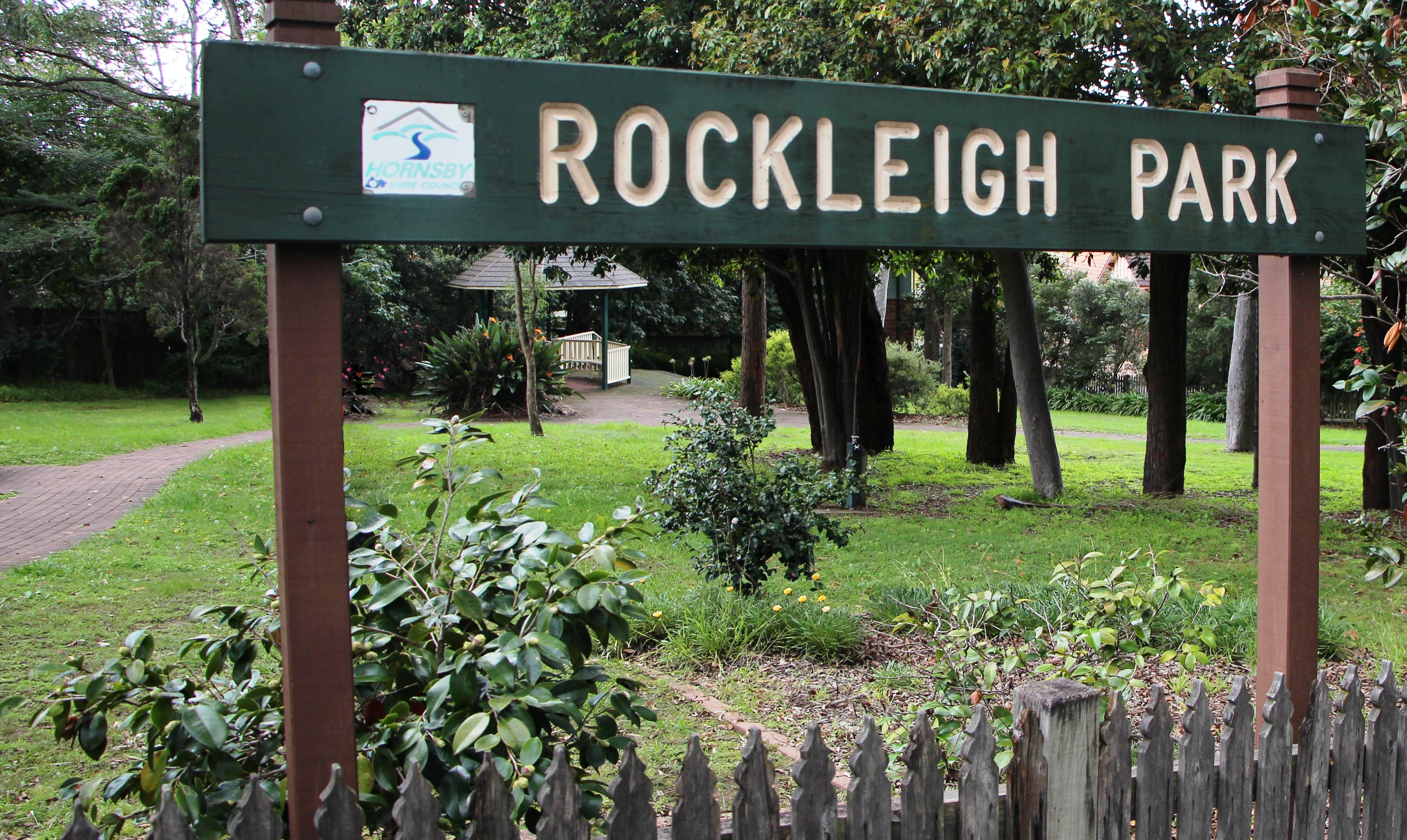
Rockleigh Park, Epping

Name	Address	Facilities
Boronia Park	37 Bridge St, Epping	Sporting field, cricket pitch, children's playground (shaded) with 6m climbing web, war memorial, children's bike track, seating, picnic shelters, barbecue, public toilets, change rooms
David Scott Reserve	97 Midson Rd, Epping	Tennis courts, children's playground, seating, picnic tables
Duncan Park	47 Kent St, Epping	Sporting field, croquet green
Epping Athletic Track	Norfolk Road, Epping	Athletics track, toilets, car park
Epping Oval	Norfolk Road, Epping	Cricket pitch, practice nets, soccer field, toilets, car park
Epping Oval Playground	Norfolk Road, North Epping	Fenced playground unit, swings, 6m climbing tower, large double picnic shelter, open grassed area, BBQ, toilets
Forest Park	Forest Grove, Epping	Rose garden, war memorial, playground, picnic tables, toilets
Grant Close Netball Courts	Grant Close, Epping	Netball courts, toilets
Henry Brigg Park (known as Maida Park until 2017)	Maida Road corner of Essex Street, Epping	Swing set, fenced
Kim Rutherford Reserve	20 Wyralla Ave, Epping	Children's playground, seating
Loftus Square	35 Willoughby St, Epping	Two children's playgrounds (junior & senior), seating, multipurpose courts, picnic facilities
North Epping Oval	Boundary Road, North Epping	Cricket pitch, soccer field, toilets, car park
Pembroke Street Park	8 Pembroke Street corner of Chambers Court, Epping	Playground, fenced, picnic table
Rockleigh Park	Essex St, Epping	Small covered pergola
Ron Payne Park	Woods St, North Epping	Cricket pitch, practice nets, soccer field, toilets, car park
Somerville Oval	Blaxland Road, Epping	Cricket pitch, practice nets, rugby field, toilets, car park
West Epping Oval	Downing street, Epping	Cricket pitch, practice nets, soccer field, toilets, car park

=== Churches ===
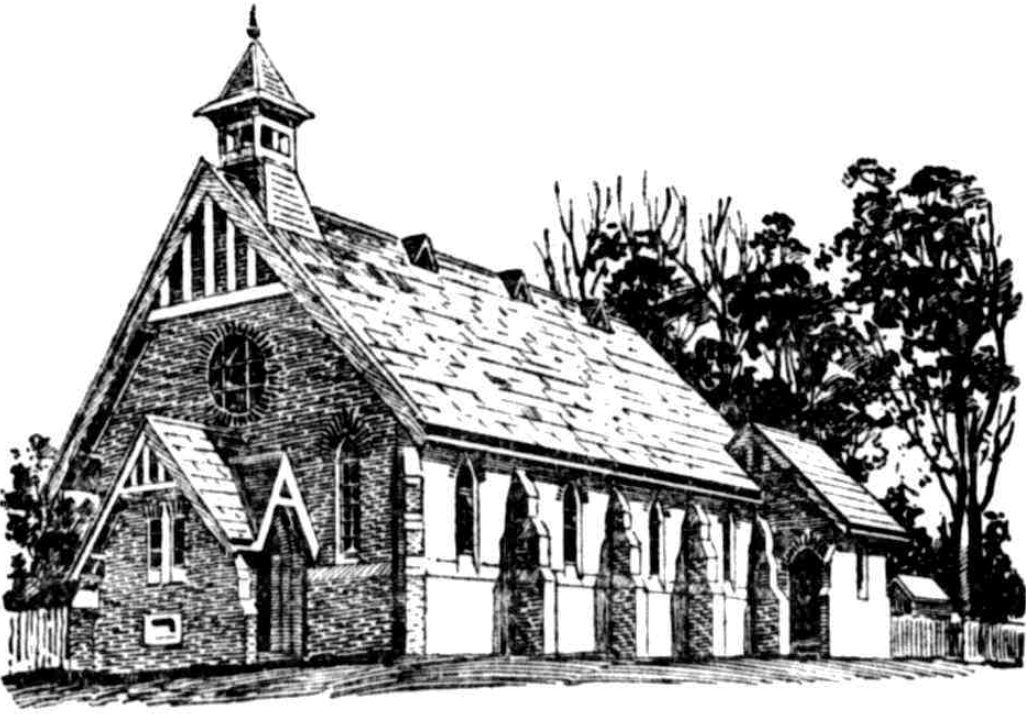
St Alban's, Epping, in 1899

- Chester Street Uniting Church (incorporates Oxford Street Uniting Church)
- Chinese Lutheran Church
- Epping Baptist Church
- Epping Church of Christ
- Epping Gospel Chapel
- Epping Presbyterian Church
- Epping Seventh-day Adventist Church
- Life Way Church (a Lutheran Church, known as St. Mark's until March 2014)
- North Side Chinese Alliance Church
- Northern Districts Chinese Christian Church
- Our Lady Help of Christians (Roman Catholic) Church
- Presbyterian Reformed Church Epping
- St. Alban's (Anglican), St. Aidan's – West Epping (Anglican) – part of the Epping Parish

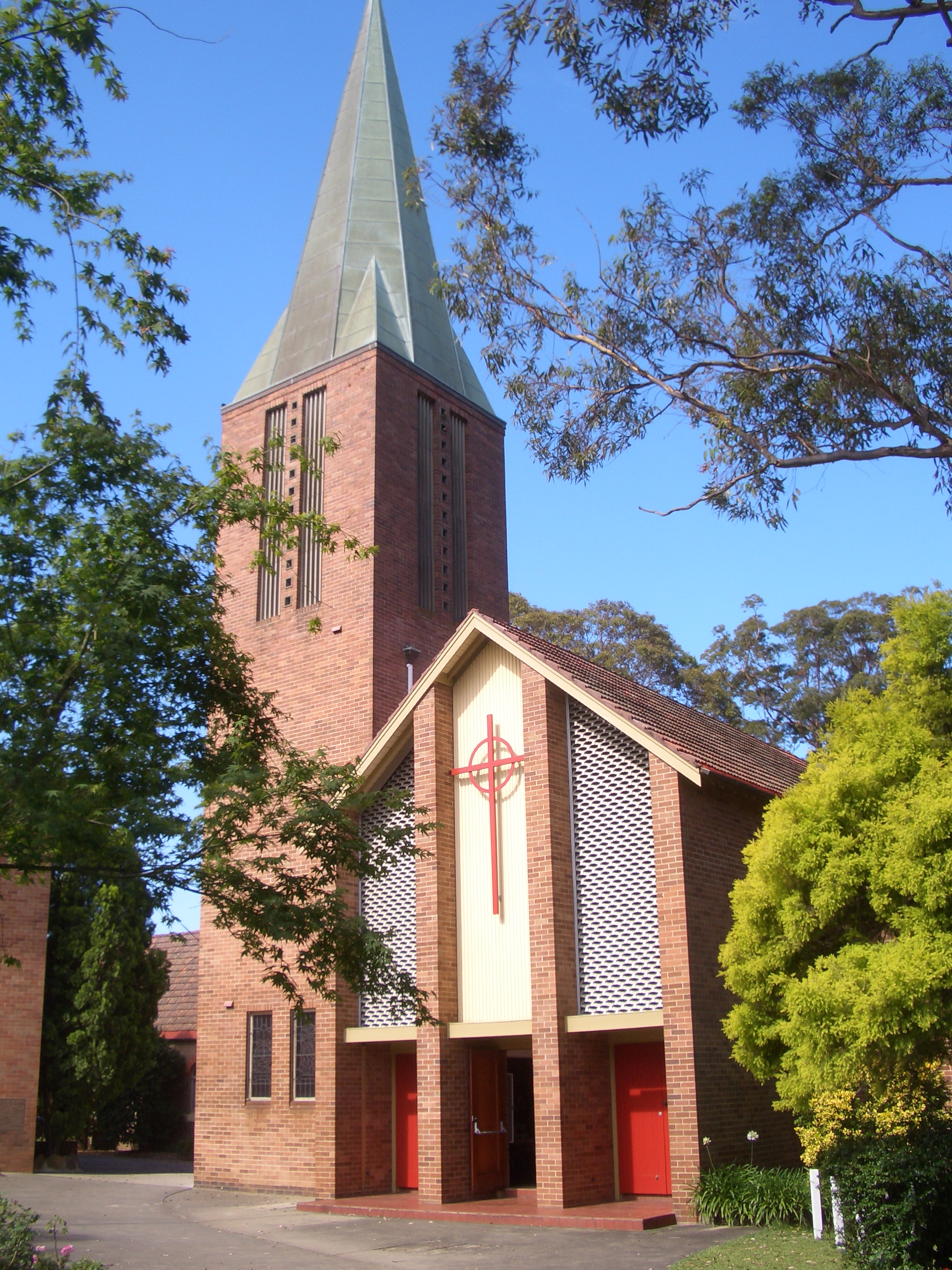
St Alban's Anglican Church

- West Epping Uniting Church

== Education ==
- Arden Anglican School (formerly the Catholic girls' school Our Lady of Mercy College)
- Epping Boys High School (located in Marsfield)
- Epping Heights Public School
- Epping North Public School
- Epping Public School
- Epping West Public School
- Ngarala Public School
- Our Lady Help of Christians Catholic Primary School

Formerly the American International School of Sydney was located here, until its closure in 2009.

== Demographics ==
Historical population
Year	Pop.	±%
2001	18,065	—
2006	18,970	+5.0%
2011	20,227	+6.6%
2016	23,688	+17.1%
2021	29,551	+24.8%

According to the 2021 census, Epping had a population of 29,551, of whom 48.5% were male and 51.5% were female. They were further broken down as follows:

Ethnic diversity
36.7% of people were born in Australia. The next most common countries of birth were China 19.7%, India 9.5%, South Korea 7.4%, Hong Kong 5.4% and Malaysia 1.7%. 30.9% of people only spoke English at home. Other languages spoken at home included Mandarin 23.1%, Cantonese 12.1%, Korean 9.3%, Hindi 3.5% and Tamil 1.9%.

Age distribution
The median age of people in Epping was 36 years (national median is 38). Children aged under 15 years made up 19.0% of the population (18.2% nationally) and people aged 65 years and over made up 13.6% of the population (17.2% nationally).

Income
Median weekly household income was $2,243, compared to the national median of $1,746.

Housing
More than three quarters (78.1%) of private dwellings were family households, 17.4% were single person households and 4.4% were group households. Stand-alone houses accounted for 42.6% of occupied dwellings, down from 55.5% five years earlier in 2016. Another 47.4% were flats, units or apartments (up from 32.2% in 2016) and 9.8% were semi-detached. The average household size was 2.8 people.

Religion
The most commonly reported religious affiliation in the 2021 census was No Religion 40.9%, followed by Catholic 12.2%, Hinduism 9.8%, Anglican 6.0%, and Buddhism 5.5%. In the twenty years from 2001 to 2021, the Census shows that the largest change in religion was the number of people who were not affiliated with any religion, which increased from 16.6% to 40.9% of the population.

Professions
Analysis of the ABS data by the Sydney Morning Herald in 2024 showed that Epping had more accountants, actuaries, tax inspectors, and ministers of religion than any other Sydney suburb.

== Government ==
At a local government level, Epping lies solely within the City of Parramatta Local Government Area.

At a state level, Epping is mostly represented by the electoral district of Epping, with a small area on the southern edge of Chesterfield Road that is within the Electoral district of Ryde.

At a federal level, Epping falls in the Division of Berowra.
