= Marsfield =

- Suburb
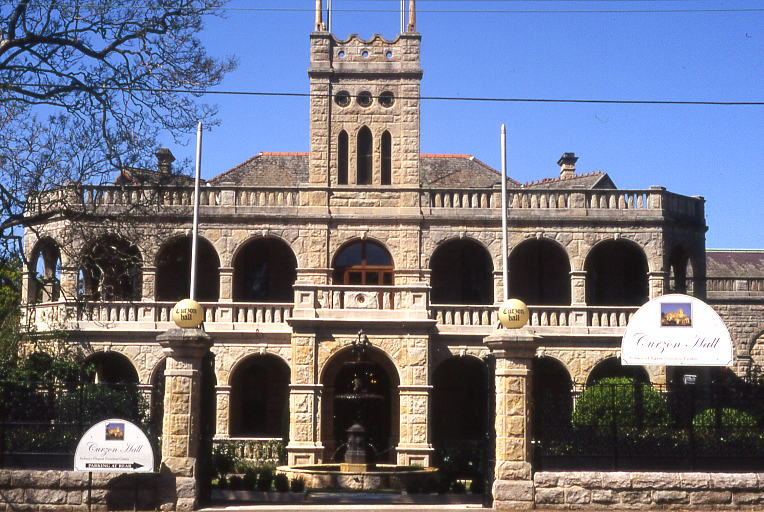
- Curzon Hall on Agincourt Road, built in 1898

- Interactive map of Marsfield
- Country: Australia
- State: New South Wales
- City: Sydney
- LGA: City of Ryde
- Location: 16 km (9.9 mi) north-west of Sydney CBD

Government
  - State electorate: Ryde
  - Federal division: Bennelong

Area
  - Total: 3.86 km^{2} (1.49 sq mi)
- Elevation: 86 m (282 ft)

Population
  - Total: 12,492 (SAL 2021)
- Postcode: 2122
Suburbs around Marsfield
North Epping; Epping	South Turramurra	Macquarie Park; West Pymble
Eastwood	Marsfield	North Ryde
Denistone East	Ryde	Ryde

Marsfield is a suburb in the Northern Sydney region of Sydney, in the state of New South Wales, Australia. Marsfield is located 16 kilometres north-west of the Sydney central business district and is in the local government area of the City of Ryde.

The suburb is near to a number of leading scientific and tertiary educational institutions such as CSIRO, Macquarie University, the Macquarie Park Business Park and Macquarie University Hospital.

== History ==
The suburb's name is derived from Field of Mars, the original name in the early days of British colonisation of Australia, given to the area by Governor Arthur Phillip in 1792.

=== Aboriginal culture ===
The whole area between the Parramatta and Lane Cove Rivers was originally known by its Aboriginal name Wallumatta. The aboriginal name survives in a local park, the Wallumatta Nature Reserve, located at the corner of Twin and Cressy Roads, North Ryde.

=== European settlement ===
In 1792, Governor Phillip began the granting of parcels of lands to Royal Marines, and the area was referred to on Phillip's maps as the Field of Mars, named after the Roman Field of Mars probably because of the military link. The area was later part of the suburb of North Ryde. Field of Mars was also the name for the parish proclaimed in 1835.

In 1874, following extensive debate including a Parliamentary Select Committee, the government resumed the Common for sale and settlement by small farmers, using the money to fund bridges across the Parramatta River at Gladesville and Iron Cove. The land was subdivided into small farms of between 0.4 and 1.6 ha (1–4 acres), and released for sale in stages, starting in 1885.

Many of the streets in Marsfield and bordering suburbs, mainly Eastwood and Macquarie Park, are named after famous historical conflicts or battles, such as Abuklea Road, Agincourt Road, Alma Road, Balaclava Road, Bannockburn Road (West Pymble), Blenheim Road (North Ryde), Buffalo Road (Gladesville), Busaco Road, Corunna Road, Cressy Road (East Ryde), Crimea Road, Culloden Road, Fontenoy Road, Herring Road, Khartoum Road, Nile Close, Plassey Road, Sobraon Road, Talavera Road, Taranto Road, Torrington Road, Trafalgar Place, Vimiera Road, Waterloo Road.

In 1894, the "Municipality of Marsfield" formed its own local government, splitting from Ryde Municipality.

Stately, historical Curzon Hall was built in the 1890s by Harry Smith and named after his wife Isabella Curzon-Smith. The house was bought in 1921 by the Society of Saint Vincent de Paul which established St Joseph's Seminary on the premises. It is now a function centre.

Until the 1950s, substantial parts of the North Ryde/Marsfield area were part of the "Green Belt" which prevented building houses on lots of less than 2 ha (5 acres). The Marsfield-North Ryde Green Belt boundaries were revised and in December 1959, 688 ha (1,700 acres) of land was rezoned. The last Green Belt land was released in September 1969 to build Macquarie Shopping Centre and Macquarie University.

== Boundaries ==
Marsfield is bounded by the Lane Cove River, Macquarie University Sports Fields, Talavera Road, Culloden Road, Waterloo Road, Vimiera Road, Marsfield Park and Culloden Road in the north, Epping Road, Shrimptons Creek, Kent Road, Ruse Street and Shrimptons Creek in the east, Bridge Road and Abuklea Road in the south and Terrys Creek in the west.

== Landmarks and institutions ==
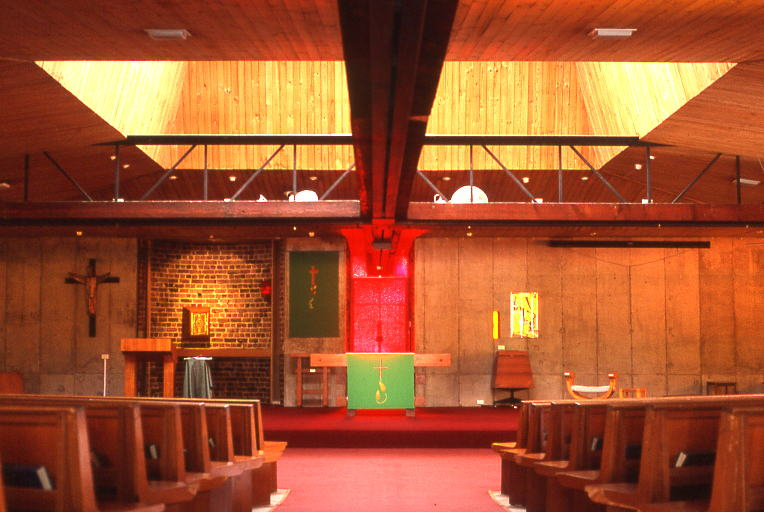
St Anthony's Catholic Church, Agincourt Road

Marsfield is home to:

- Curzon Hall, 53 Agincourt Rd (built 1898 by businessman Harry Smith), a large castle-like manor in neo-Romanesque style, now turned restaurant/function centre
- St Anthony's Catholic Church, 54 Agincourt Rd - a Modernist/Brutalist church building designed by Italian architect Enrico Taglietti (1968).
- Epping Boys High School;
- Commonwealth Scientific and Industrial Research Organisation (CSIRO)
  - Radio Physics Laboratory.
  - Data61: Information Communication Technology (ICT) Centre, and
- Headquarters for the
  - Australia Telescope National Facility, and
  - Anglo-Australian Observatory.
- TG Millner Field

== Housing ==
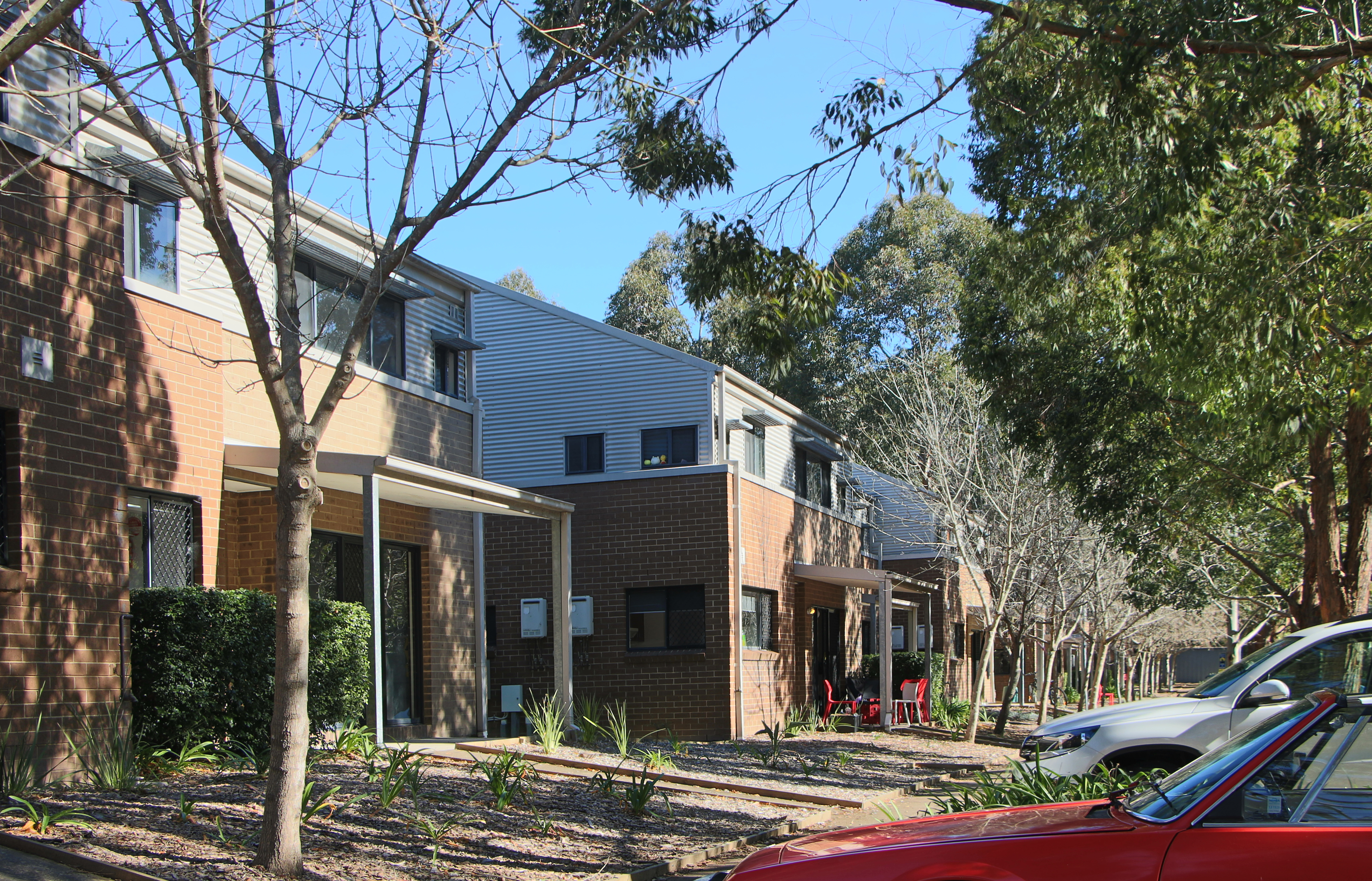
Accommodation for Macquarie University students

This green suburb features large, modern homes on the higher parts with city views, and townhouses/units in the parts of the suburb that border South Turramurra and Epping. A large number of the residents are students of Macquarie University.

At the 2021 census, 46.6% of occupied private dwellings were semi-detached (townhouses etc.), 31.6% were separate houses and 21.5% were flats, units or apartments. 65.8% were family households, 27.9% were single person households and 6.3% were group households. The average household size was 2.5 people. The tenure was split between 37.2% of properties that were rented, 29.4% owned outright and 27.4% owned with a mortgage.

== Public transport ==
A number of bus routes service Marsfield. The 292/293 routes run from the city through Lane Cove and terminate in Busaco Road, while many other routes e.g. 288/291 travel along Epping Road to Epping station.

Macquarie University railway station is located on Herring Road between the university and Macquarie shopping centre.

== Demographics ==
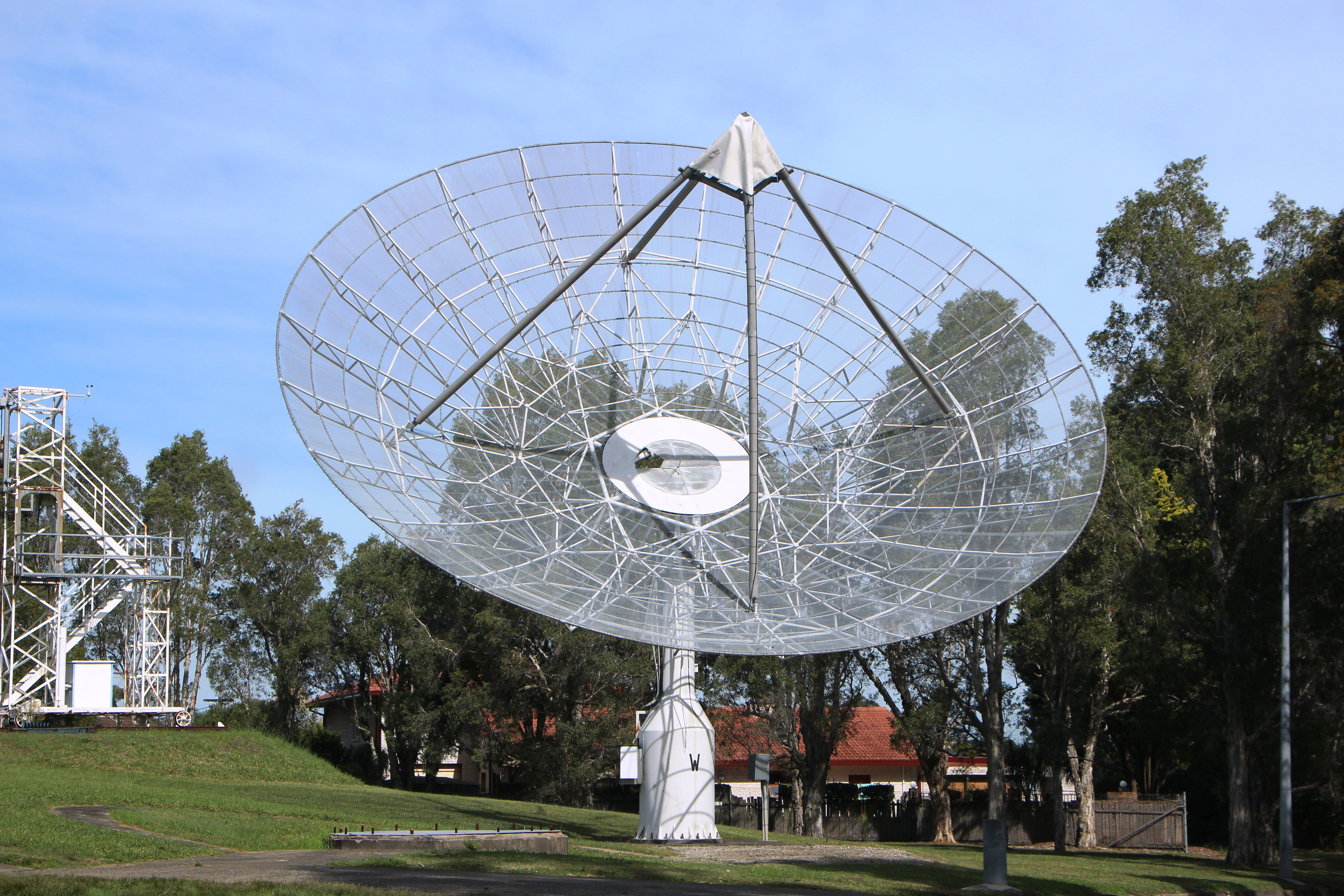
The larger of two radio dishes at the Marsfield headquarters of the CSIRO Department of Radio Physics.

At the 2021 census, Marsfield recorded a population of 12,492. Of these:

Age distribution
The residents of Marsfield were slightly younger than the country as a whole, with fewer children. Marsfield residents' median age was 39 years, compared to the national median of 38. Children aged 0–14 years made up 15.7% of the population (the national average was 18.2%) and people aged 65 years and over made up 19.2% of the population (the national average was 17.2%).
Ethnic diversity
43.2% of people were born in Australia. The most common non-Australian countries of birth were China 14.3%, India 4.5%, Hong Kong 4.4%, South Korea 2.5% and the Philippines 2.1%. However, only 14.4% identified their ethnic ancestry as Australian; the other common self-identified ancestries were Chinese 32.0%, English 16.2%, Irish 4.8% and Indian 5.5%. 42.8% of people only spoke English at home. Other languages spoken at home included Mandarin 15.9%, Cantonese 9.6%, Korean 3.1%, Italian 1.8% and Hindi 1.8%.
Religion
The most common responses for religion were No Religion 39.1%, Catholic 20.1%, Anglican 6.3% and Buddhism 4.9%.
Income
The median weekly household income was $1,943, somewhat above the national median of $1,746.
