= Catholic Parish of Epping and Carlingford =

- Our Lady Help of Christians Catholic Church & St Gerard Majella Catholic Church
- Country: Australia
- Denomination: Roman Catholic
- Website: https://www.eppcarl.org.au/

Administration
- Diocese: Broken Bay

Clergy
- Bishop: Sede vacante
- Priest: Rev Jim McKeon

The Catholic Parish of Epping and Carlingford is a Roman Catholic parish located in the suburbs of Epping and Carlingford in Sydney, New South Wales, Australia. The parish is in the Diocese of Broken Bay. The parish has two separate and distinct communities, based around the two churches: Our Lady Help of Christians (OLHC) Catholic Church at Epping, and St. Gerard Majella Catholic Church at Carlingford.

The current Parish Priest is Father Jim Mckeon.

== History ==
The original church building at Epping had the foundation stone laid on 19 May 1907. Up until 1950, Carlingford residents had been a part of the Epping parish, but then the boundaries changed, putting them in Rydalmere Parish – a long way away. This emphasised the need for Carlingford residents to have their own church. Father Stephen Ford of St Mary's, Rydalmere, celebrated the first mass in the Carlingford Scout hall. At an evening meeting at the Scout hall some time later, the decisions was made to purchase the burnt-out shell of a Presbyterian church from Campsie for 90 pounds. This was to be situated on Housing Commission land on the corner of Evans Road and Pennant Hills Road, opposite the Carlingford Bowling Club. Extensions to what became Our Lady of the Way church were completed in March 1956, with mass celebrated by Father Ford of Rydalmere. Four years later, Father Robert Nolan was made priest of the new parish of Dundas/Carlingford, but when the five-year lease with the Housing Commission expired in 1962, the church had to be dismantled. The congregation began to look for new premises. On 13 May 1962, the first mass of St Gerard's catholic Church was held in a disused building of the Pennant Hills Wireless Station, located on the north-eastern corner of North Rocks and Pennant Hills Roads, which had been decommissioned in 1959. An old shed was converted into a church. On 3 May 1963, St Gerard's became a separate parish, with Father Nolan transferring from Dundas to become the first parish priest. The St. Gerard Majella Catholic Primary School was opened by the Sisters of Mercy in September, 1964. A new Church building at Carlingford was completed in 1972 and Father Nolan continued as Parish Priest until his retirement in 1978. Father Finian Egan, V.F., was then appointed in his place. From 2000, Carlingford and Epping Parishes began to share many staff and resources, including a priest. On 1 July 2007, the two Parishes reunited to form the Catholic Parish of Epping and Carlingford. However, in the one parish, there remain two separate and distinct communities based around the two churches (which are both of equal status): OLHC at Epping and St Gerard's at Carlingford.

== Parishes: One or two? ==
In late 2006 and early 2007 it was decided that the Catholic Parishes of Epping and Carlingford would again become one parish. It was decided that from July 1, 2007, the two Parishes would be combined as one Parish, under the name of The Catholic Parish of Epping and Carlingford. The two churches will remain as "two equal and distinct communities collaborating and cooperating within the structure of a single parish".

== Sexual abuse allegations ==
In May 2010, allegations of sexual abuse made against Father Finian Egan were raised on the Australian Broadcasting Corporation's The 7:30 Report. These offenses were alleged to have occurred during his time at St Gerard's Carlingford, and an investigation by the Church upheld the allegations. Sexual abuse charges against Egan were successfully defended with the later NSW Solicitor General & Epping MLA, Damien Tudehope appearing for Egan. Further charges were brought against Egan in 2013, and Egan was found guilty and jailed. After release in 2018, Egan's Australian Citizenship was stripped from him in a decision by Peter Dutton. The decision was confirmed in the Federal Court in 2021, clearing the way for Egan to be deported.
