= Terrys Creek =

Coordinates: 33°46′40″S 151°05′50″E

Terrys
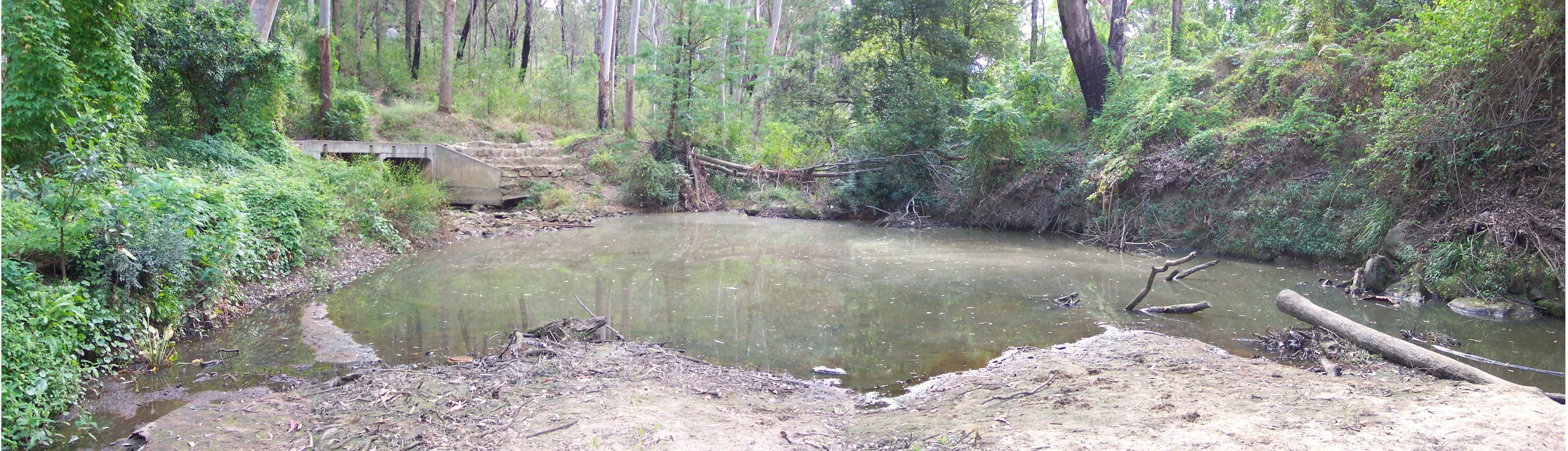

Location
- Country: Australia
- State: New South Wales
- Region: Sydney basin (IBRA), Northern Suburbs
- Local government areas: Parramatta, Ryde, Hornsby

Physical characteristics
- Source
  - location: north of Dundas Valley
- Mouth: confluence with Devlins Creek to form the Lane Cove River
  - location: North Epping
- Length: 7 km (4.3 mi)
- Basin size: 10.12 km^{2} (3.91 sq mi)

Basin features
- River system: Lane Cove River catchment
- National park: Lane Cove NP

Terrys Creek, an urban watercourse that is part of the Lane Cove River catchment, is located in Northern Suburbs region of Sydney, Australia. It was named after Edward Terry (1840–1907) who served as the first mayor of Eastwood municipality. It is recommended as a bushwalk.

== Course and features ==
Terrys Creek rises about 1 kilometre (0.62 mi) north of the suburb of Dundas Valley, east of Marsden Road; with its headwaters forming the watershed boundary between the Hornsby Plateau and the Cumberland Plain. The creek flows generally north by north-east before reaching its confluence with Devlins Creek to form the Lane Cove River, north-east of the suburb of North Epping, in Lane Cove National Park. The course of the creek is approximately 7 kilometres (4.3 mi); and the catchment area is 10.12 square kilometres (3.91 sq mi), spread over the Parramatta, Ryde and Hornsby local government areas.

The catchment area has been subject to periodic flooding, most notably in 1967/8, November 1984, and in February 1990 when 174 residents were displaced as a result of rising flood waters. The 1984 flood resulted in flooding of a number of residential properties throughout the catchment, and also resulted in considerable damage and disruption in the Eastwood town centre.

Terrys Creek is transversed by the Main North railway line, Epping Road, and the M2 Hills Motorway.

== See also ==
- Great North Walk
- Great North Road
- Lane Cove National Park
- Rivers of New South Wales
