= Gore Creek (Oregon) =

- Location within Oregon Location within the United States

Physical characteristics
- Source
  - coordinates: 42.2541667°N 122.8611111°W
- Mouth
  - coordinates: 42.3029050°N 122.8469824°W

Gore Creek is a stream in the U.S. state of Oregon. It is a tributary to Bear Creek.

Gore Creek was named in 1852 after Mary Elizabeth Gore.
