= Gore Creek (New South Wales) =

Coordinates: 33°49′S 151°10′E

Gore Creek Gores Creek
- Etymology: William Gore

Location
- Country: Australia
- State: New South Wales
- Region: Sydney basin (IBRA), Northern Suburbs
- Local government area: Lane Cove

Physical characteristics
- Source: The Gore Hill
  - location: Lane Cove
- Mouth: confluence with the Lane Cove River
- Length: 2 km (1.2 mi)

Basin features
- River system: Lane Cove River catchment
- Nature reserves: Lane Cove Bushland Park; Gore Creek Reserve

Gore Creek, an urban watercourse that is part of the Parramatta River catchment, is located in Northern Suburbs region of Sydney, Australia.

== Course and features ==
Gore Creek rises in the suburb of Lane Cove on the western side of the Pacific Highway, south of Epping Road and the Lane Cove Tunnel, and east of Burns Bray Road; near the Lane Cove shopping village. The creek flows generally south then south-east, through the Lane Cove Bushland Park and Gore Creek Reserve before reaching its confluence with the Lane Cove River south of Greenwich Hospital. The course of the creek is approximately 2 kilometres (1.2 mi).

The creek is traversed by River Road at Northwood.

Gore Creek draws its name from the suburb of Gore Hill, named in honour of William Gore, the provost-marshal under Governor William Bligh. Gore received a grant of 150 acres (0.61 km^{2}) in 1810 and named it Artarmon after his family estate in Ireland.

== See also ==
- Rivers of New South Wales
