= North Epping =

- Suburb
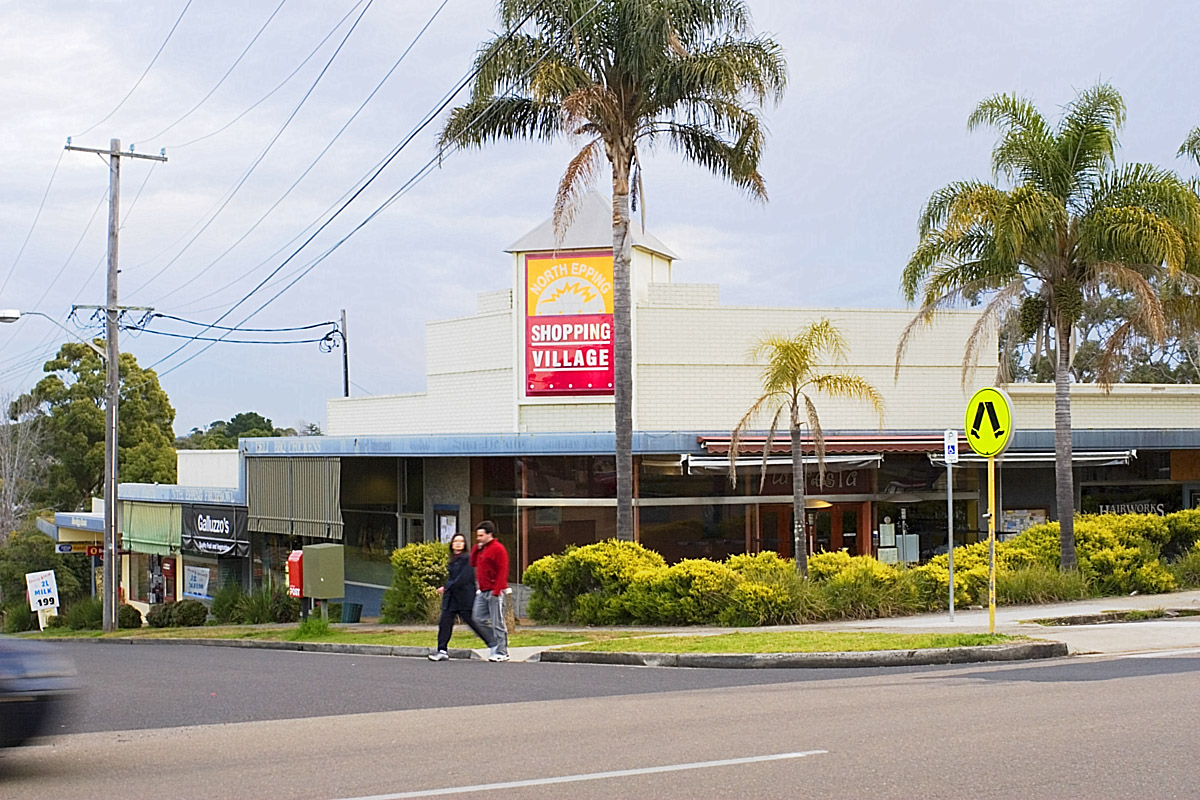
- North Epping retail area

- Interactive map of North Epping
- Country: Australia
- State: New South Wales
- City: Sydney
- LGA: Hornsby Shire
- Location: 19 km (12 mi) from Sydney CBD
- Established: 1899

Government
  - State electorate: Epping
  - Federal division: Berowra

Area
  - Total: 2.3 km^{2} (0.89 sq mi)
- Elevation: 98 m (322 ft)

Population
  - Total: 4,657 (SAL 2021)
- Postcode: 2121
Suburbs around North Epping
Pennant Hills	Wahroonga	South Turramurra
Cheltenham	North Epping	South Turramurra; West Pymble
Epping	Marsfield	Macquarie Park

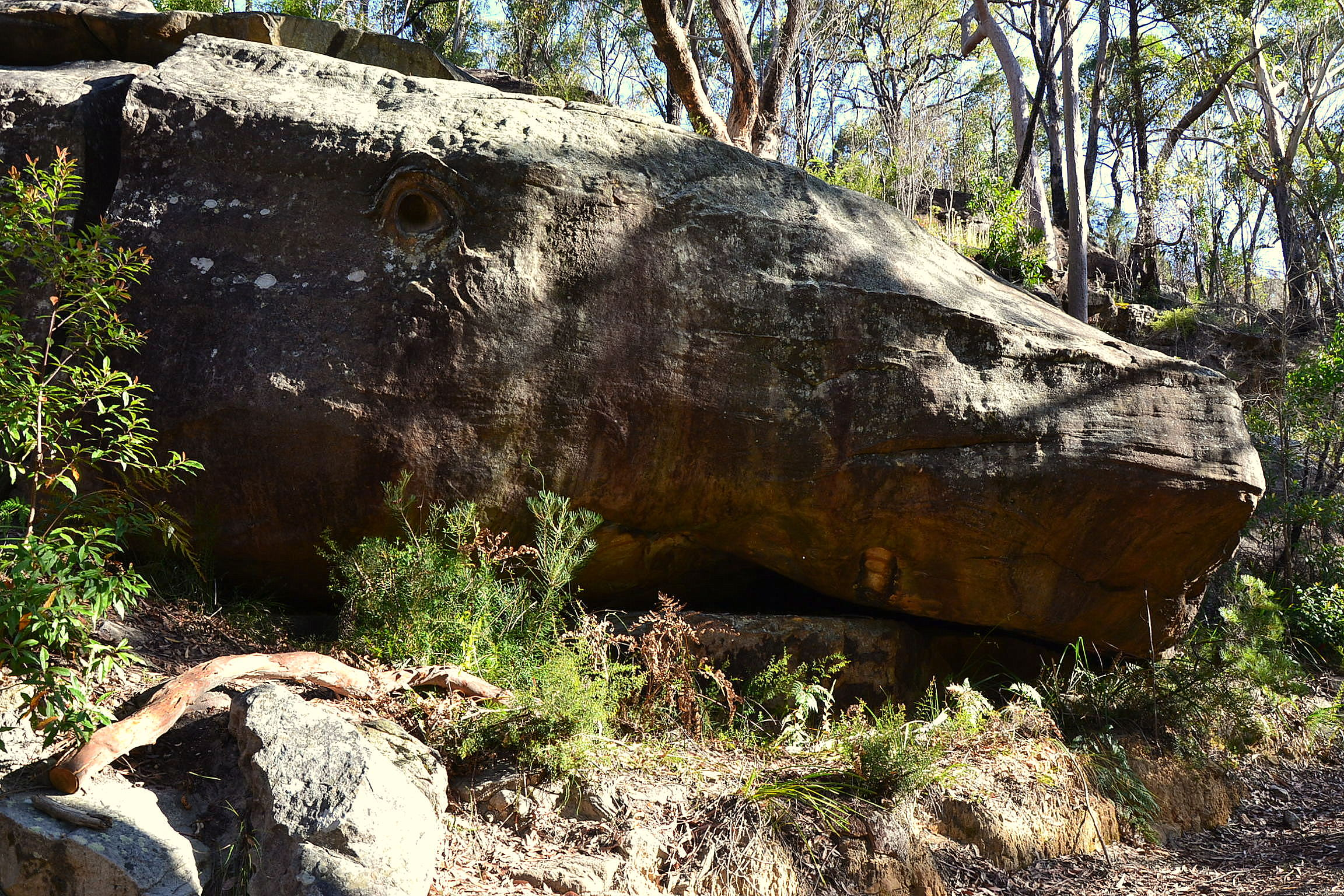
Whale Rock formation, on the Boundary Road Fire Trail

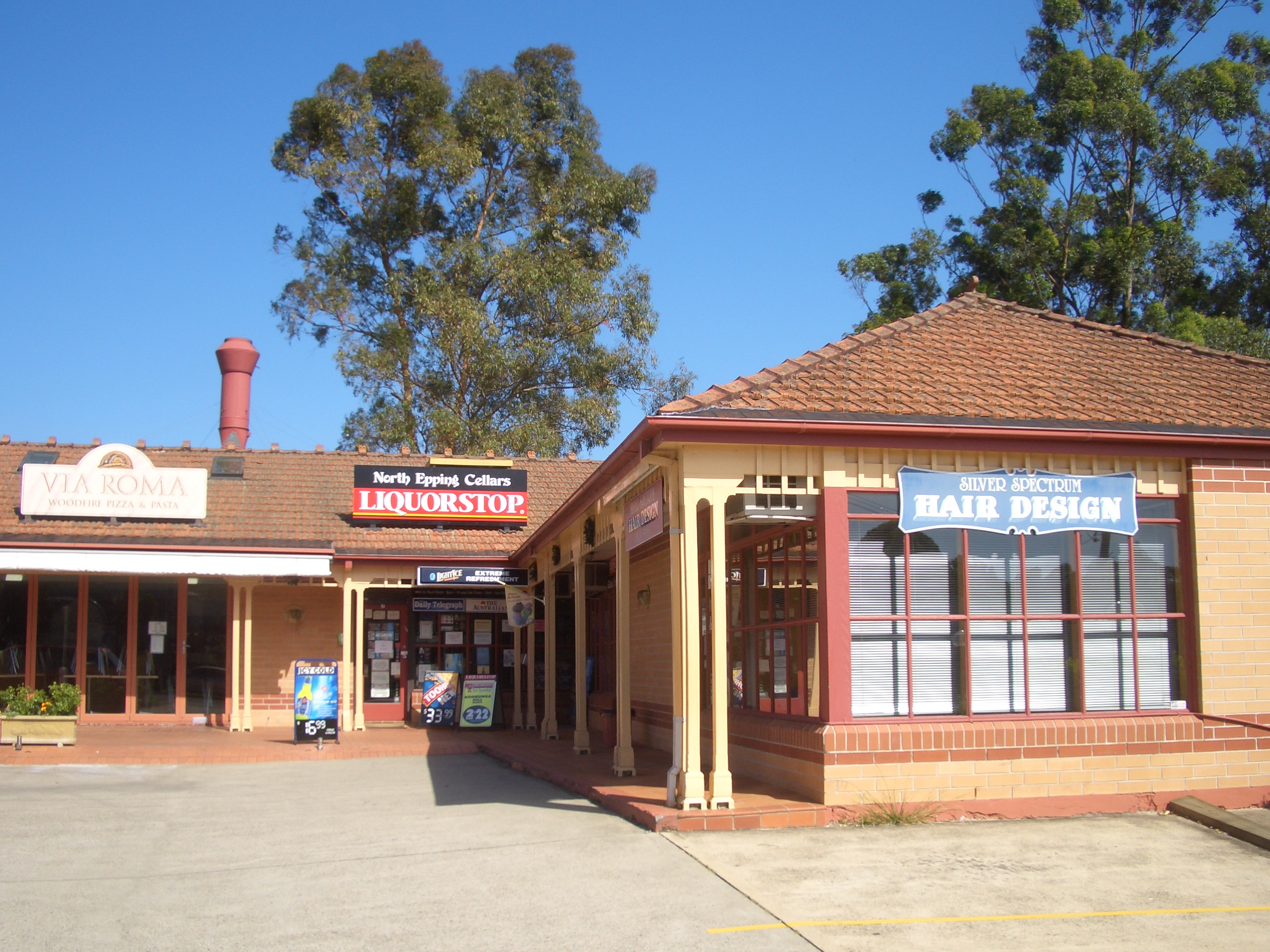
North Epping shops

North Epping is a suburb of Sydney, in the state of New South Wales, Australia 19 kilometres north-west of the Sydney central business district in the local government area of Hornsby Shire. North Epping is in the Northern Sydney region, and is often referred to as part of the "North-West" or North Shore. Epping is a separate suburb to the south and under the Parramatta City Council, which shares the postcode of 2121.

North Epping is a leafy suburb, surrounded by bushland of the upper section of Lane Cove National Park.

North Epping is an exclave of Hornsby Shire Council, geographically cut off from the bush land shire by the Lane Cove National Park. North Epping relies on nearby Epping for much of its infrastructure, including transport, libraries, and public swimming pools.

There are many walking trails, including the Great North Walk which also links residing suburbs such as South Turramurra, Marsfield and West Pymble. One of the well known landmarks is Whale Rock.

== History ==
=== Aboriginal culture ===
The Wallumedegal Aboriginal tribe lived in the area between the Lane Cove River and Parramatta River, which was known as Walumetta.

=== European settlement ===
In 1792 Governor Arthur Phillip began the granting of parcels of lands to marines, and the area was referred to on Phillip's maps as the Field of Mars, named after the Roman Field of Mars probably because of the military link. It contained the area of what is now Epping and North Epping. The name Epping is derived from Epping Forest in Essex, England. The land was broken up into farms and orchards, and after World War II it started to convert to residential use. Areas which had previously been reserved as part of the green belt scheme became available for residential development in 1948. North Epping post office was established in 1954 and the public school in 1960.

=== Becoming a separate suburb ===
North Epping was split off from Epping as a separate suburb on 1 December 1995.

=== Parramatta Council Amalgamation ===
Following the amalgamation of Epping into the City of Parramatta in 2016, North Epping became a pene-exclave of Hornsby Shire. The Parramatta Council has previously planned to expand to North Epping.

== Commercial area ==
North Epping has a small shopping village located on the corner of Roma Street and Malton Road. It features a number of specialty shops (including one small supermarket), cafes and restaurants. North Epping also has a small primary school - Epping North Public School. North Epping has many parks, many community areas and gatherings.

== Transport ==
The M2 Hills Motorway runs along the southern border to the Sydney central business district. North Epping is connected to adjacent Epping by a single road, Norfolk Road. Norfolk Road runs south towards Epping Road. Almost all areas of the suburb are serviced by Busways route 295. The route is a loop and only goes clockwise around the edge of the suburb - the only place where it runs in both directions is Norfolk Road south of Grayson Road, towards Epping railway station.

== Demographics ==
At the 2021 census, North Epping recorded a population of 4,657. Of these:

Age distribution
North Epping residents' median age was 44 years, compared to the national median of 38. Children aged 0–14 years made up 18.9% of the population (the national average was 18.2%) and people aged 65 years and over made up 18.6% of the population (the national average was 17.2%).
Ethnic diversity
62.1% of people were born in Australia. The most common countries of birth were China 6.9%, India 4.3%, England 3.2%, Hong Kong 3.1% and South Korea 2.4%. 65.0% of people only spoke English at home. Other languages spoken at home included Mandarin 9.4%, Cantonese 5.8%, Korean 3.3%, Hindi 2.1% and Sinhalese 0.7%.
Religion
The most common responses for religion were No Religion 37.8%, Catholic 18.5% and Anglican 14.7%, Hinduism 4.3% and Christian, nfd 3.2%.
Income
North Epping is a wealthy area, with an average weekly household income of $3,062, well above the national average of $1,746.
Housing
The majority of dwellings 92.0% were separate houses. 85.5% were family households and 13.5% were single person households. The average household size was 3.1 people.

== Politics ==
North Epping is under the municipal authority of Ward C in the Hornsby Shire Council, is part of the federal electorate of Berowra and State electorate of Epping.

== Churches ==
- All Saints Anglican Church (295 Malton Rd), a contemporary Anglican Church.
- Northern District Chinese Christian Church Sydney (41 Boundary Road), a Chinese Evangelical Church.

== See also ==
- Lin family murders (Australia)
