= South Turramurra =

- Suburb
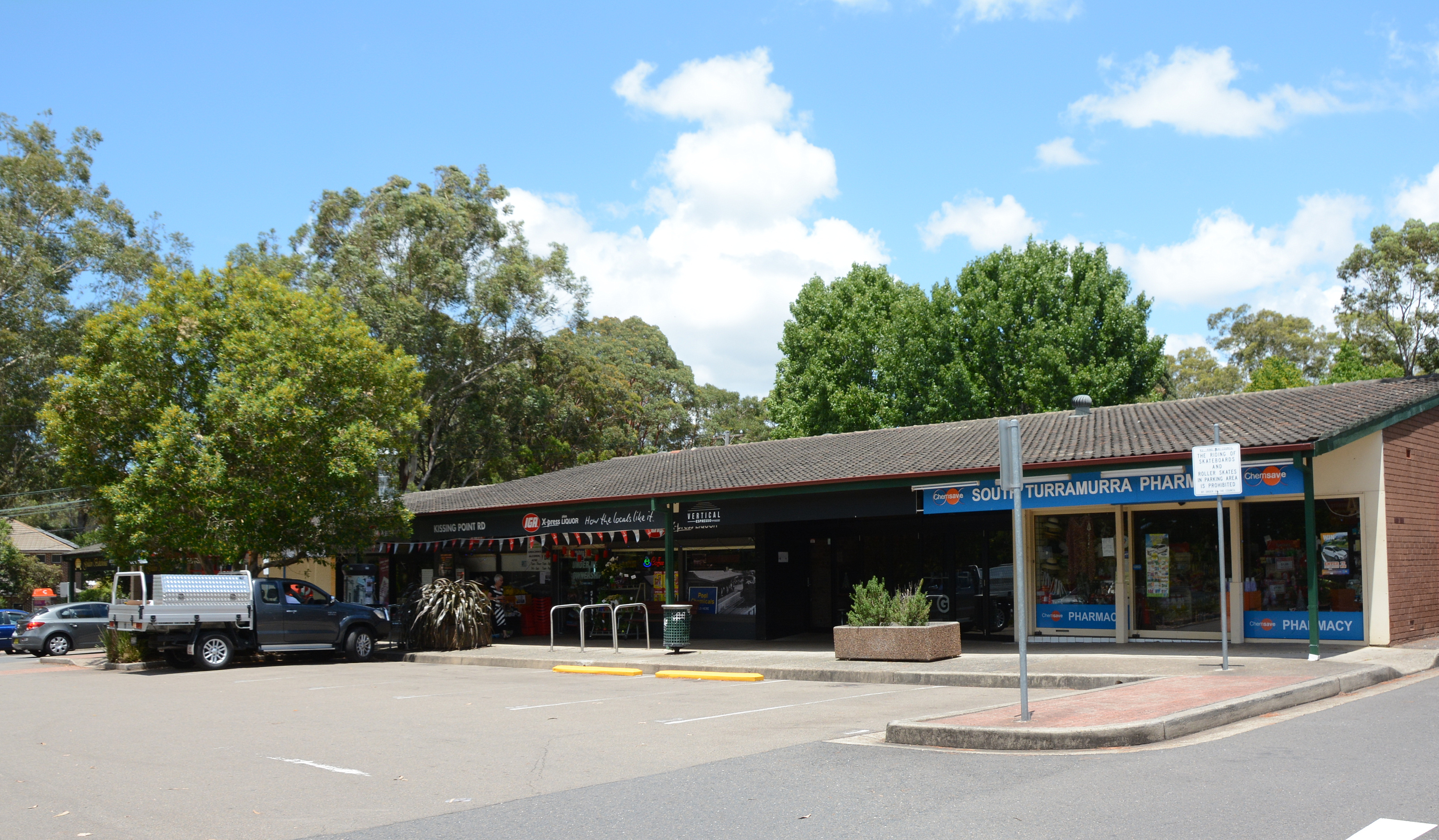
- South Turramurra shops

- Interactive map of South Turramurra
- Country: Australia
- State: New South Wales
- City: Sydney
- LGA: Ku-ring-gai Council
- Location: 18 km (11 mi) north-west of Sydney CBD
- Established: 5 August, 1994 (Separated from Turramurra

Government
  - State electorate: Wahroonga
  - Federal division: Bradfield

Area
  - Total: 3.0 km^{2} (1.2 sq mi)
- Elevation: 100 m (330 ft)

Population
  - Total: 3,208 (2021 census)
  - Density: 1,069/km^{2} (2,770/sq mi)
- Postcode: 2074
Suburbs around South Turramurra
Thornleigh; Pennant Hills	Wahroonga	Turramurra
North Epping	South Turramurra	Pymble
Marsfield	Macquarie Park	West Pymble

South Turramurra is a suburb on the Upper North Shore of Sydney in the state of New South Wales, Australia 18 kilometres (11 mi) north-west of the Sydney central business district, in the local government area of Ku-ring-gai Council. Turramurra and North Turramurra are separate suburbs.

South Turramurra is a leafy suburb, surrounded by the upper section of the Lane Cove National Park. There are many walking trails, including the Great North Walk and walking trails with access to neighbouring suburbs such as North Epping, Marsfield and West Pymble.

== History ==
Turramurra is an Aboriginal word which is thought to mean either big hill, high place, or small watercourse. Early settlers referred to the area as Eastern Road until the name Turramurra was adopted when the railway station was built in 1897.

During the early 1990s, a community organisation (Coalition Against Lane Cove Valley Freeways) was formed to oppose plans for the construction of the B2/B3 extension, designed to connect the M2 motorway in North Epping with the Pacific Highway.

South Turramurra became a separate suburb from Turramurra on 5 August 1994.

== Demographics ==
At the 2021 census, the suburb of South Turramurra recorded a population of 3,208 people. Census data shows that:

South Turramurra's Age distribution reflects the popularity of the suburb with families and retirees. The median age was 42 years, compared to the national median of 38 years. Children aged under 15 years made up 21.9% of the population (national average is 18.2%) and people aged 65 years and over made up 17.3% of the population (national average is 17.2%).
Ethnic diversity : 66.7% of people were born in Australia, compared to the national average of 66.9%; the next most common country of birth was England at 5.8%. 76.1% of people only spoke English at home. Other languages spoken at home included Mandarin at 5.5%.
Religion : The most common responses for religion were No Religion 41.2%, Catholic 17.6% and Anglican 17.4%.

== Transport ==
The nearest railway station is Turramurra. CDC NSW bus route 571 runs between Turramurra station and South Turramurra along Kissing Point Road, and route 572 runs the same route extended to Macquarie University.

The Comenarra Parkway, a minor arterial road consisting of one lane in each direction, creates a boundary with Turramurra, to the north east and connects to West Pymble to the south east.

== Commercial area ==
South Turramurra Shopping Village is located on the corner of Auluba Road and Kissing Point Road.

== Schools ==
- Turramurra High School Located on Maxwell Street
- Turramurra Public School is located on the south side of Turramurra but is technically in Turramurra, not South Turramurra

== Parks ==
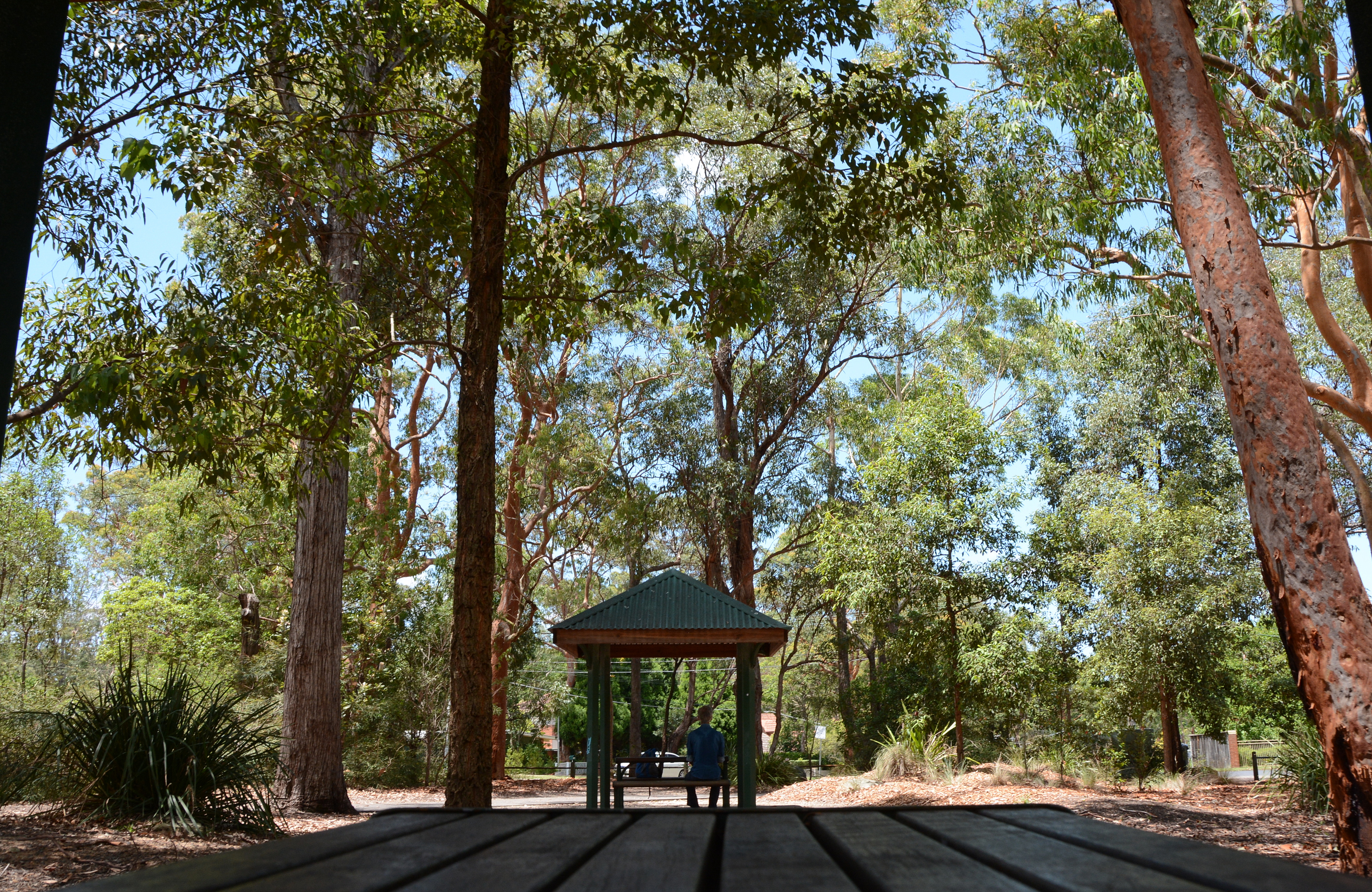
Kissing Point Village Green

South Turramurra is surrounded on the other three sides by the Lane Cove National Park.

- Field of Dreams, Kissing Point Road near Vernon Street
- Sir David Martin Oval (Auluba Oval), Auluba Road (Home of Kissing Point Sports Club)
- Netball Courts, Canoon Road

== Community ==
The strong community support for the anti-freeway campaigners resulted in the protection of the bushland at the foot of the suburb of South Turramurra as part of the Lane Cove River National Park. Many different and diverse action groups were formed (and still remain) in order to effectively lobby government. The environmental community group STEP Inc, which was formed in South Turramurra in 1978 has grown to be a powerful force for the environment in northern Sydney.

1st Turramurra Scout Group is a Scout Group, with active programs for boys and girls aged from 8–11 Cub Scouts, 11–15 Scouts through to young men and women 15–17 Venturer Scouts and 18–25 Rovers.

Turramurra and Kissing Point Rover Scout Units, both based on the south side of Turramurra, are active groups of young people aged 18~25, who are into a wide range of outdoor, social and community service activities.

There are also a number of churches and various religious temples in South Turramurra, some having youth groups for children aged 5–18 years old.
