= Lane Cove River =

River in Northern Sydney, New South Wales, Australia

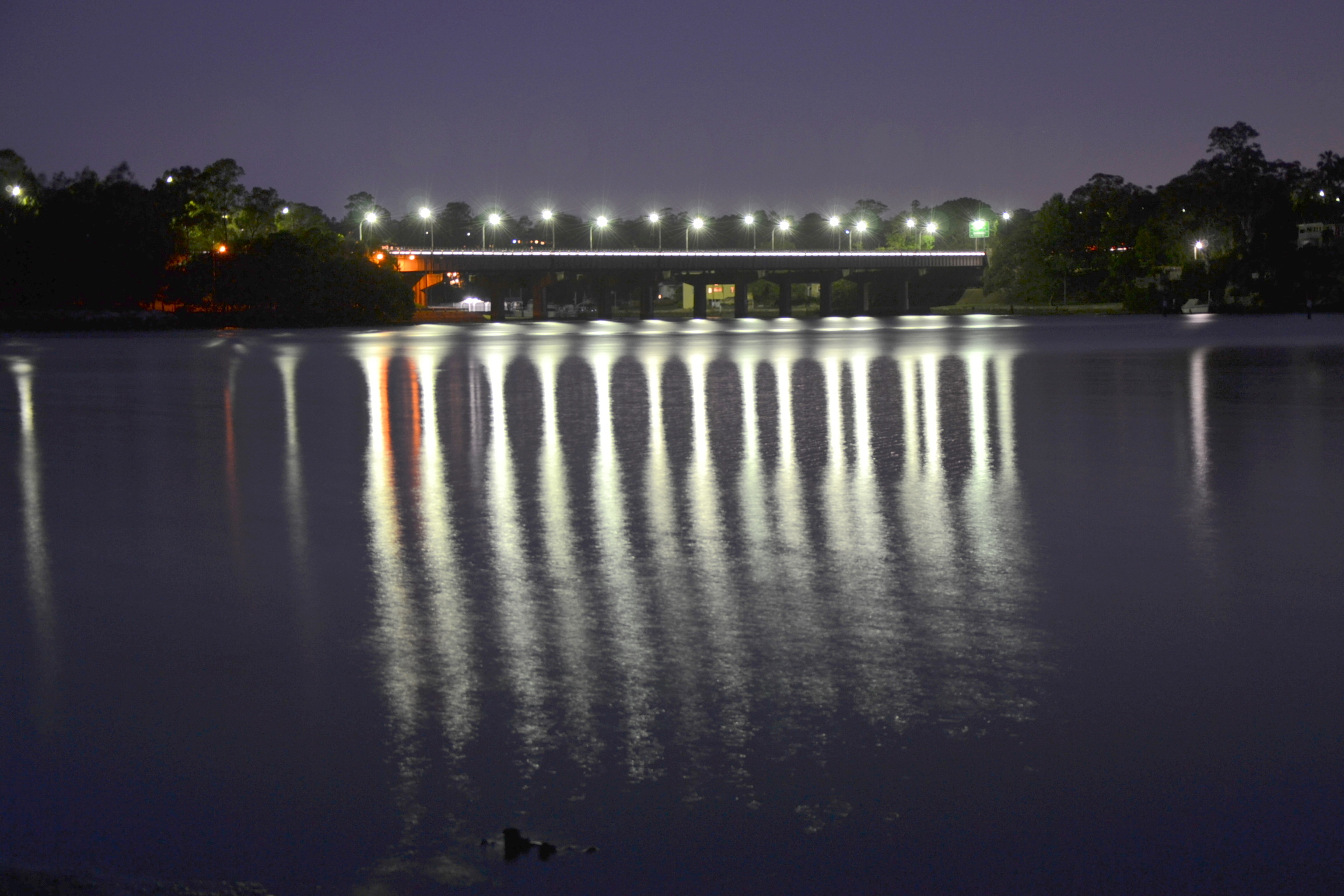
- Lane Cove River at night, showing the Fig Tree Bridge

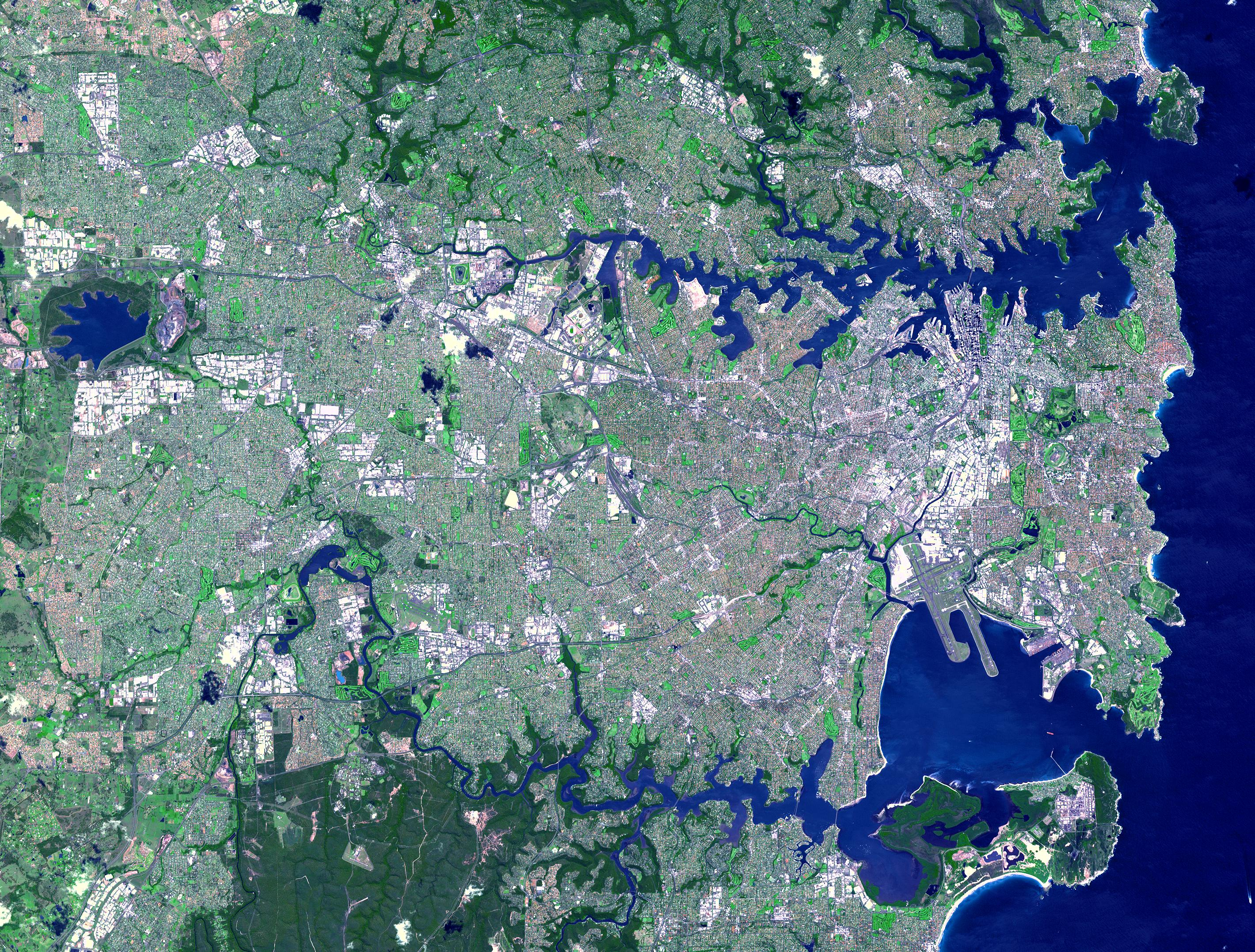
- NASA satellite view of Greater Metropolitan Sydney, with the location of the mouth of the Lane Cove River as it flows into the Parramatta River, as marked

Location
- Country: Australia
- State: New South Wales
- Region: Sydney basin (IBRA)
- LGAs: Ku-ring-gai, Ryde, Willoughby, Lane Cove, Hunters Hill, Hornsby

Physical characteristics
- Source: Thornleigh Oval
  - location: Thornleigh
  - coordinates: 33°44′5.9994″S 151°5′20.3994″E
- Source confluence: Scout Creek
  - location: Lane Cove National Park at Cheltenham
  - coordinates: 33°44′41.9994″S 151°5′24″E
- Mouth: Parramatta River
  - location: Greenwich Point and Woolwich
  - coordinates: 33°50′32.3998″S 151°10′38.3988″E
- Length: 15 km (9.3 mi)

Basin features
- River system: Parramatta River catchment, Sydney Basin
- Tributaries
  - left: Gore Creek
  - right: Devlins Creek, Terrys Creek

The Lane Cove River, a northern tributary of the Parramatta River, is a tide-dominated, drowned valley estuary west of Sydney Harbour, located in Sydney, New South Wales, Australia. The river winds through a bushland valley and joins Parramatta River at Greenwich and Woolwich, where together they form an arm of Sydney Harbour, and serves as a border along with Middle Harbour separating Sydney's North Shore.

== Ecology ==
The Lane Cove River rises near Thornleigh and flows generally south for about 15 kilometres (9.3 mi). Its catchment area is approximately 95.4 square kilometres (36.8 sq mi).

The upper reaches are in a narrow, forested valley eroded into the North Shore Plateau. Fiddens Wharf was the site of early 19th century logging. The middle reaches are impounded by a weir just upstream of Fullers Bridge. Sections of the valley are forested and are protected within the Lane Cove National Park, an area of 598 hectares (1,480 acres), formerly a State Recreation Area. The lower reaches of the Lane Cove River, downstream from the weir near Fullers Bridge, are tidal and merge into Sydney Harbour at Greenwich and Woolwich. There are significant areas of mangrove communities along the shores.

The confluence of the river with Scout Creek is in Lane Cove National Park at Cheltenham. At North Epping, still within the confines of the national park, it is joined by Devlins Creek from the south and Terrys Creek near Macquarie Park. South–west of Killara and Lindfield, the width of the river expands, continuing south through Lane Cove River National Park, towards the suburbs of Linley Point and Riverview, before finally reaching its mouth between Greenwich Point and Woolwich, where it merges with Parramatta River and soon after becomes part of Port Jackson, more commonly known as Sydney Harbour.

Devlin Creek was named after the Devlin family, who lived in Willandra, a historical house in Ryde.

== Register of the National Estate ==
The area surrounding the river, no more than 1 kilometre (0.62 mi) wide, is called Lane Cove National Park, and is a site of ecological importance, listed on the Australian Register of the National Estate. It contains an endangered community of fungi, some species of which have still not been classified.

A popular caravan park and campground known as Lane Cove River Tourist Park is located on the western side of the valley above the river.

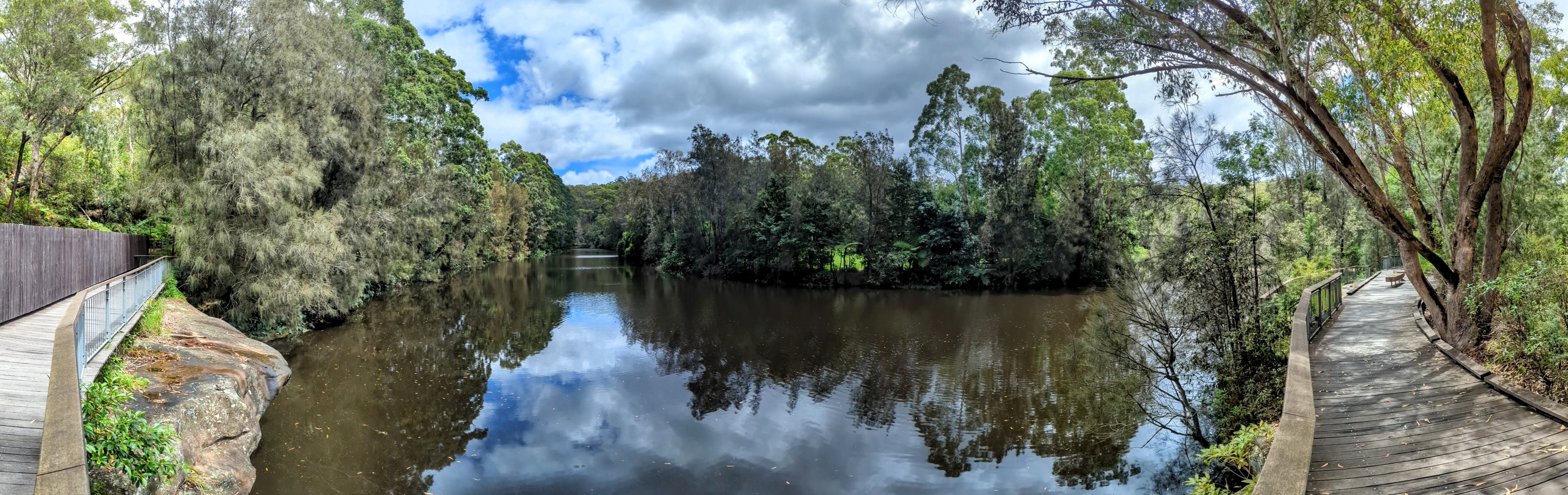
At Lane Cove National Park

== Great North Walk ==
The Lane Cove River is the site of many old trails and tracks, some of which have survived from logging days. They are now used for recreational purposes. Some of them have been incorporated into the Great North Walk, a long-distance walking trail from Sydney to Newcastle. This trail passes along the Lane Cove River between Boronia Avenue, Hunters Hill, and Thornleigh Oval, Thornleigh. On the east side of Thornleigh Oval, the trail makes use of Lorna Pass, a track built during the Depression of the 1930s to provide relief work. The pass was named after Lorna Brand, who raised money for the work. Another trail, the Lane Cove Valley Walk, stretches from Thornleigh to Lindfield.

== Fairyland ==
From 1913 to the early 1970s, the Swan family operated a picnic area called Fairyland, which was located on the banks of the river, upstream from Epping Road. The area was originally a market garden, but the family turned it into a picnic area when they realised the commercial potential. Facilities were developed to the point where Fairyland had its own footbridge, BBQ fireplaces, boat swing, razzle dazzle ride, shelter, dance hall and wharf. The area has now returned to nature and is contained within the Lane Cove National Park. The Great North Walk passes through it.

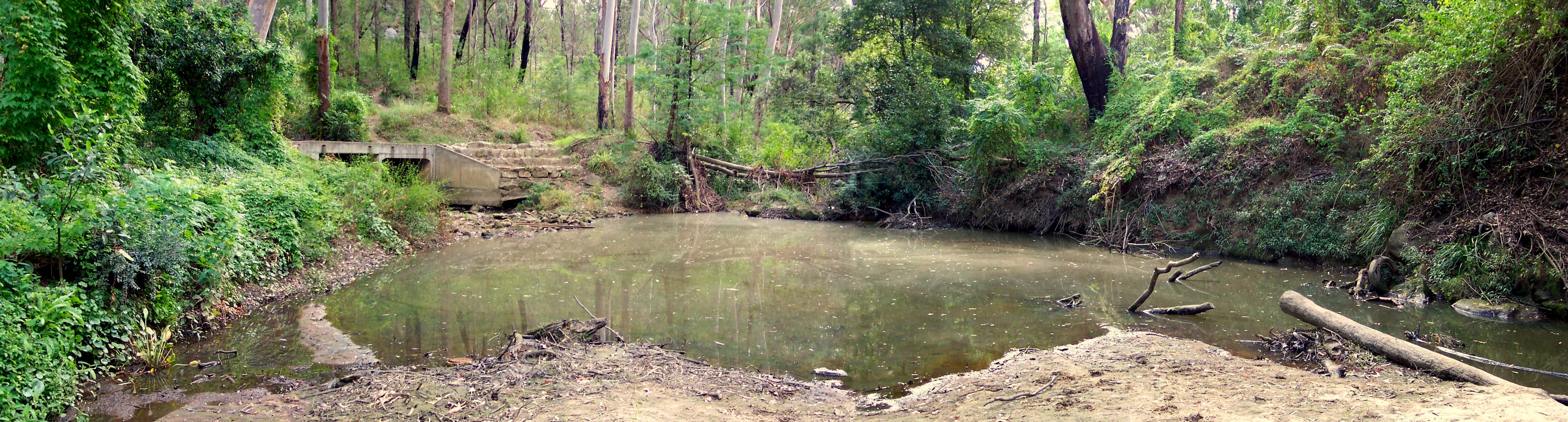
Brown's Waterhole on the Lane Cove River, near Epping, in 2006. The bank on the left has since been reinforced to prevent erosion.

== Cultural items of significance ==
Harry Smith was a businessman who owned land in what is now the Marsfield area. Smith created a picnic area in a section of his property he called Curzon Park, which bordered the Lane Cove River and consisted of eighty acres of bushland. The picnic area has long since returned to nature, but a set of stone steps can still be seen at the top of the escarpment above the river. It is almost certain that Smith had these steps built to provide access to the picnic area. This is supported by a news item from 1899, which states that a set of stone steps went down to the picnic area.

Smith also had a quarry in the area, near the present location of Talavera Road, from which he obtained the stone to build his mansion, Curzon Hall. The latter was built circa 1899 and is located at the intersection of Balaclava and Agincourt Roads. The name Curzon came from his wife's name: Isabella Curzon Webb. The building was purchased by the Vincentian Fathers in 1922 and turned into a Catholic seminary. In 1983 it was acquired for business purposes and became a function centre. Curzon Hall is listed on the New South Wales Heritage Register as a site of significance. Smith is remembered as a philanthropist who allowed the public to use the picnic area free of charge, and who built the public school in Marsfield. He died in 1913.

The river is known for being the site of the mysterious deaths of Dr Gilbert Bogle and Margaret Chandler on 1 January 1963. The cause of their deaths has never been established; but there is a strong theory that the two deaths may have been caused by accidental hydrogen sulphide poisoning, due to the build-up of the poisonous gas beneath the river bed that formed both naturally and by pollutants from nearby factories along the river.

== Bridges ==
Four bridges cross the Lane Cove River:

- De Burghs Bridge on A3 which connects North Ryde and West Pymble.
- Fullers Bridge on A38, which connects Chatswood and North Ryde.
- Epping Road Bridge carrying Epping Road traffic on the sides and M2 Hills Motorway in the centre, both of which connect Lane Cove to Ryde.
- Fig Tree Bridge on Burns Bay Road, which connects Lane Cove West and Hunters Hill.

== Gallery ==
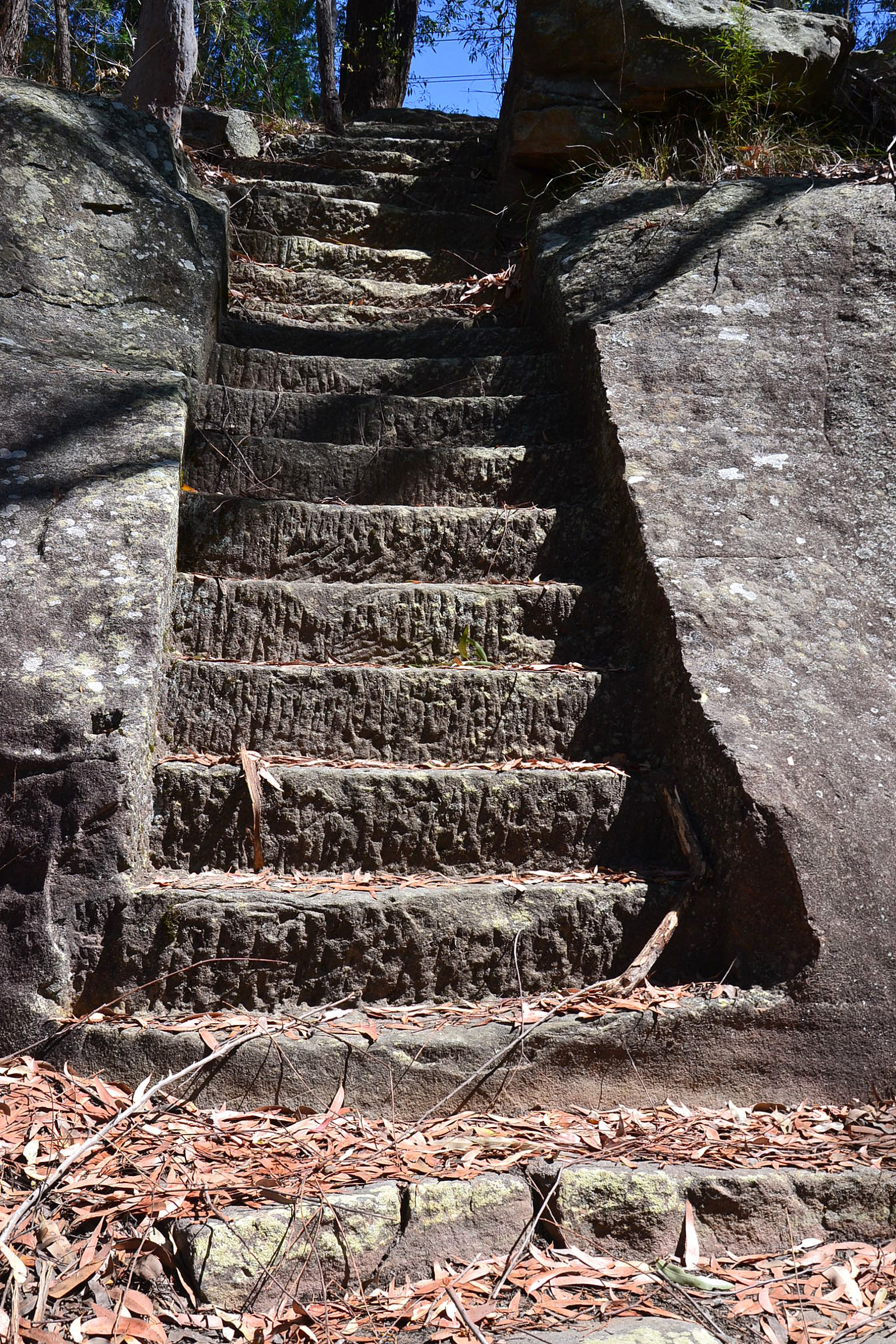
Steps that provided access to Harry Smith's picnic area

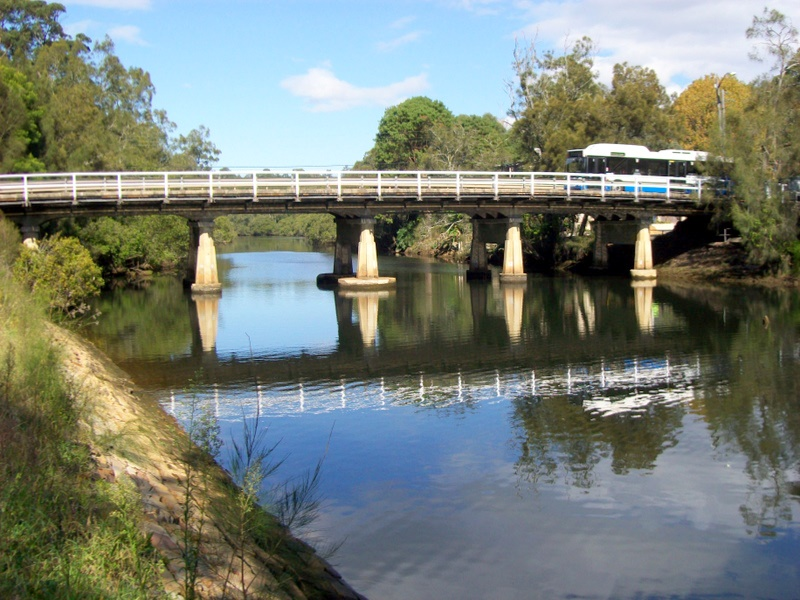
Lane Cove River at Fullers Bridge, Chatswood West.

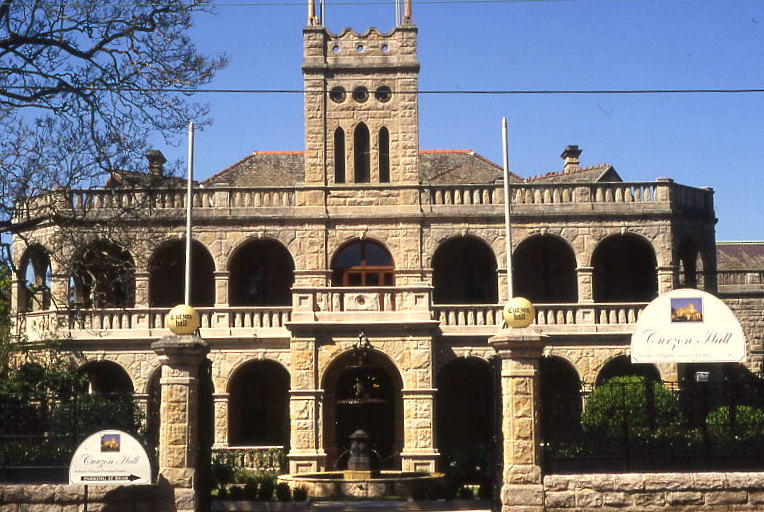
Curzon Hall

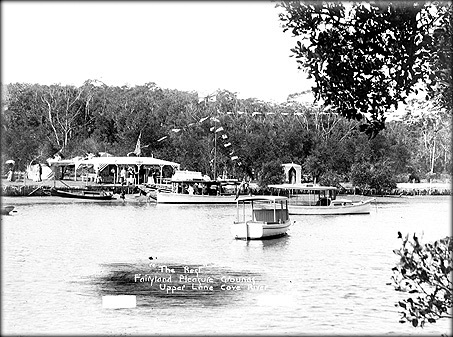
Archival photo of Fairyland

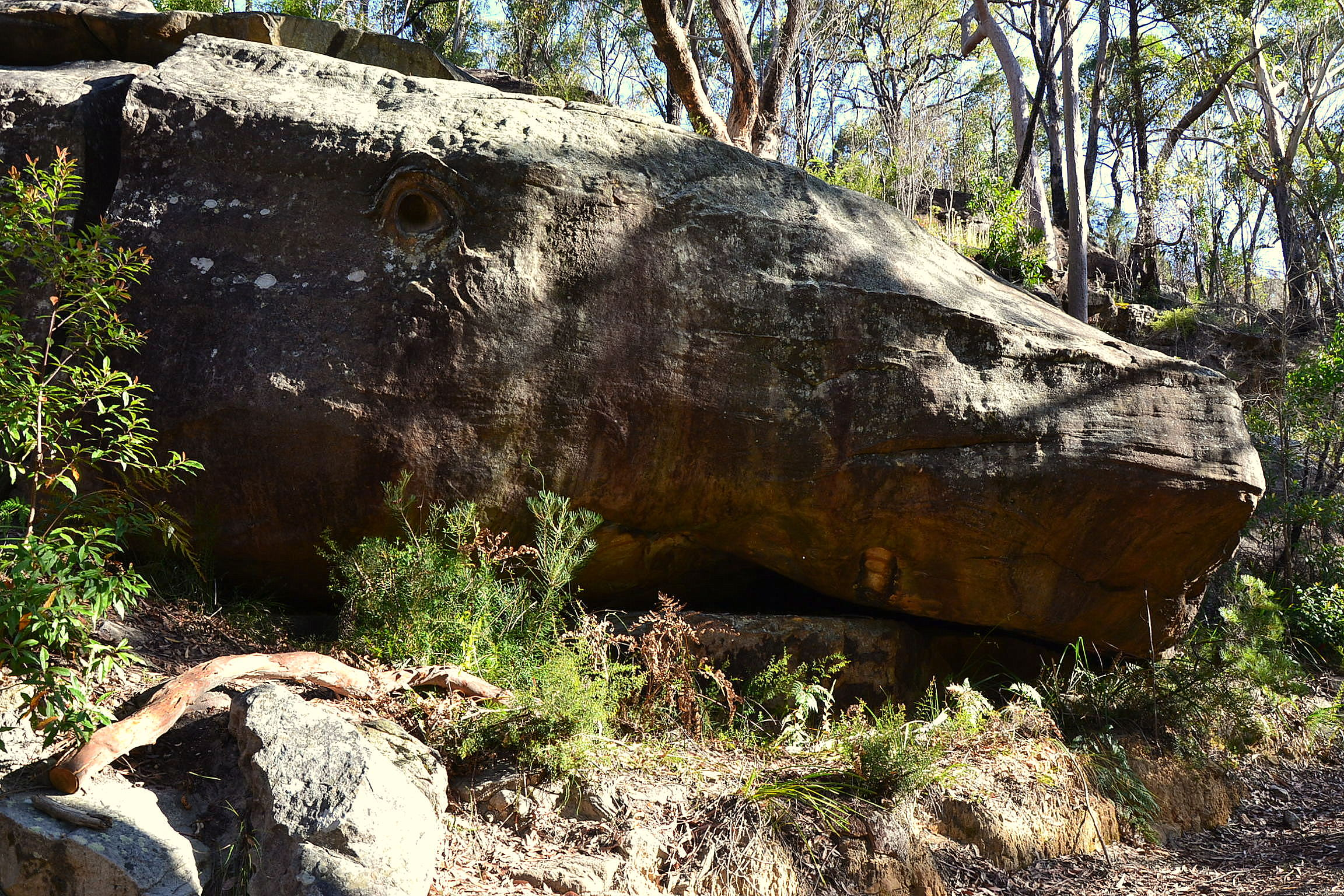
Formation known as Whale Rock outside Cheltenham

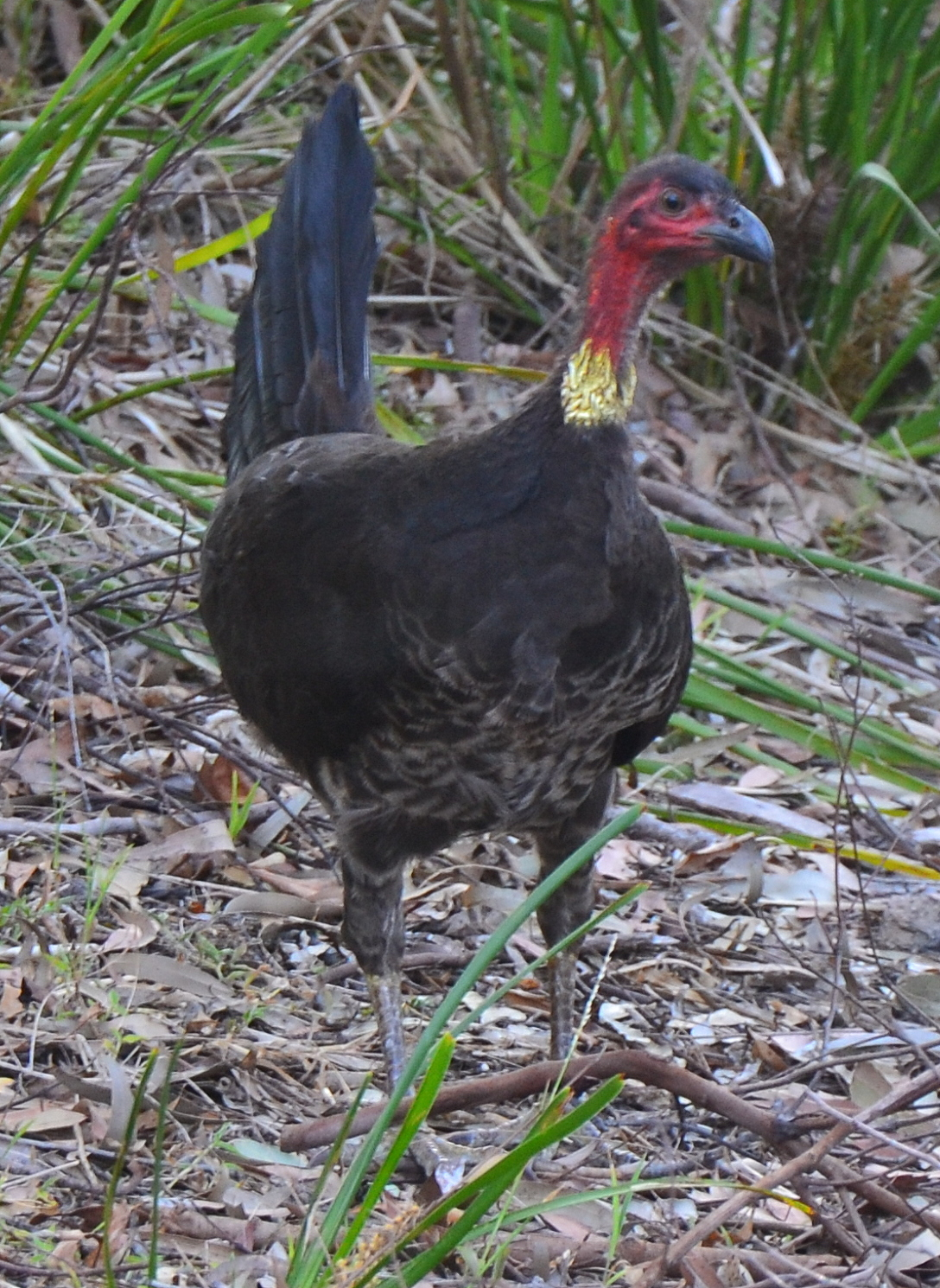
An Australian Brushturkey in the national park

== See also ==
- List of rivers of Australia
- List of rivers of New South Wales (L-Z)
- Rivers of New South Wales
- Athanassio Comino, an oyster lease holder on the river as early as 1882
