= Field of Mars Reserve =

Protected nature reserve in Sydney, Australia

- Location within New South Wales
- Location: New South Wales
- Nearest city: East Ryde
- Coordinates: 33°48′51.78″S 151°7′45.03″E
- Area: 0.46 km^{2} (0.18 sq mi)
- Established: 1979
- Governing body: NSW National Parks and Wildlife Service
- Website: Official website

The Field of Mars Reserve is a protected nature reserve located on the northern suburbs of Sydney, in the state of New South Wales, Australia. The 50 Hectare (123.5 acres) reserve is a remnant of bushland situated between the Lane Cove and Parramatta rivers within the suburb of East Ryde and near Gladesville, Hunters Hill and Ryde.

== Features ==
The name Field of Mars was given by Governor Arthur Phillip, when in January 1792 he granted to two marines the first parcels of land, later expanded to eight parcels in this district. There are a number of theories on the origin of the name, the first is that it was a direct reference to the Roman God of war and the marines' service in the colony. The second theory is that it is named after the Roman Campus Martius, which also has a military connection. The third theory is that it is named after the Champ de Mars in Paris, again with military connections. The name was later used on the parish in the area, which is still today used on land titles. The area became known initially as the Field of Mars Common.

The reserve was a gazetted as a wildlife refuge in 1979 under the National Parks and Wildlife Act (NSW) and features considerable flora and fauna and contains an environmental education centre. The reserve adjoins the Field of Mars Cemetery, bounded by Strangers Creek in the north and Wellington Road in the south.

The Field of Mars Fires devastated part of the reserve by bushfires in 2002.

The Sydney suburb of Marsfield derives its name from the reserve.

== See also ==
- Protected areas of New South Wales
