= A38 (Sydney) =

Road route in New South Wales, Australia

A38 (numerous constituent roads) New South Wales

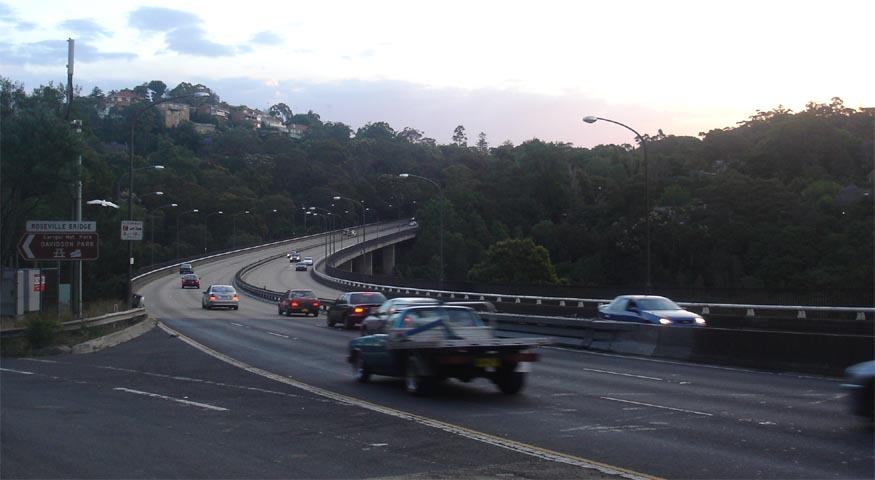
- Early evening traffic of A38 on Roseville Bridge
- Coordinates: 33.794282°S 151.134434°E (West end); 33.758678°S 151.280498°E (East end)

General information
- Type: Road
- Length: 17.9 km (11 mi)
- Gazetted: August 1928
- Route number(s): A38 (2013–present)
- Former route number: State Route 29 (1974–2013)

Major junctions
- West end: Epping Road; North Ryde, Sydney
- M2 Hills Motorway; Pacific Highway; Forest Way; Wakehurst Parkway
- East end: Pittwater Road; Dee Why, Sydney

Location(s)
- Major suburbs: Chatswood, Roseville, Frenchs Forest, Beacon Hill

Highway system
- Highways in Australia; National Highway • Freeways in Australia; Highways in New South Wales

The A38 is a route designation of a major metropolitan arterial route through suburban Sydney, linking M2 Hills Motorway in North Ryde and Pittwater Road (A8) in Dee Why. This name covers a few consecutive roads and is widely known to most drivers, but the entire allocation is also known – and signposted – by the names of its constituent parts: Delhi Road, Millwood Avenue, Fullers Road, Pacific Highway, Boundary Street, Babbage Road and Warringah Road.

The A38 also has some notable bridges: Fullers Bridge (built in 1938) and Roseville Bridge (a newer bridge which replaced an older one in 1966).

== Route ==
The A38 commences at the intersection with Epping Road in North Ryde and heads in an easterly direction as Delhi Road as a two-lane, single carriageway road, crossing into Chatswood West over the Lane Cove River via Fullers Bridge and becoming Milwood Avenue, intersecting with and turning into Fullers Road a short distance afterwards. It meets and runs north along Pacific Highway in Chatswood for a short distance before turning off and heading east along Boundary Street in Roseville as a four-lane, single carriageway road, before widening into a six-lane, dual-carriageway road and changing name to Babbage Road in Roseville Chase, before changing name again to Warringah Road just before it crosses Middle Harbour via Roseville Bridge. It continues in an easterly direction through Frenchs Forest before eventually terminating at the intersection with Pittwater Road in Dee Why.

== History ==
The passing of the Main Roads Act of 1924 through the Parliament of New South Wales provided for the declaration of Main Roads, roads partially funded by the State government through the Main Roads Board (MRB). Main Road No. 191 was declared along this route on 8 August 1928, from Ryde to the intersection with Great Northern Highway (today Pacific Highway at Chatswood); with the passing of the Main Roads (Amendment) Act of 1929 to provide for additional declarations of State Highways and Trunk Roads, this was amended to Main Road 191 on 8 April 1929. Main Road 328 was declared along this route on 24 January 1933, from the intersection with Pacific Highway at Roseville along Boundary Street and Babbage Road, over Roseville Bridge, and along Middle Harbour Road, Rodborough Road, Beacon Hill Road and May Road to Dee Why.

Parts of Main Road 328 - namely Middle Harbour Road and the western section of Rodborough Road, the western section of Beacon Hill Road and the western section of May Road - were officially renamed Warringah Road, between Roseville Bridge and Pittwater Road in Dee Why, on 10 January 1951.

The passing of the Roads Act of 1993 updated road classifications and the way they could be declared within New South Wales. Under this act, the A38 retains its declaration as Main Roads 191 (from North Ryde to Chatswood) and 328 (from Roseville to Dee Why), and part of Highway 10 (Pacific Highway from Chatswood to Roseville).

The route was allocated State Route 29 in 1974. When M2 Hills Motorway opened in 1997 and Metroad 2 was re-aligned onto it from the western section of Epping Road, the western end of State Route 29 was extended along Epping Road to terminate at Lane Cove Road (then Metroad 3, now A3). With the conversion to the newer alphanumeric system in 2013, it was truncated back to the interchange of Delhi Road with Hills Motorway, and replaced with route A38.

An underpass along Warringah Road was constructed in the Frenchs Forest area as part of the Northern Beaches Hospital Road Connectivity and Network Enhancement Project (Stage 2). The underpass opened to traffic on 28 March 2020. It allows Warringah Road traffic to bypass three sets of traffic lights at Forest Way, Hilmer Street and Wakehurst Parkway. Upgrades along Wakehurst Parkway would also help to connect the A38 to the proposed Western Harbour Tunnel and Beaches Link.

== Major intersections ==
LGA	Location	km	mi	Destinations	Notes
Ryde	North Ryde–Macquarie Park boundary	0.0	0.0	Epping Road – Epping, North Ryde, Lane Cove	Western end of Delhi Road
Ryde	North Ryde–Macquarie Park boundary	0.2	0.12	M2 Hills Motorway (M2) – Seven Hills, Eastern Creek, Prestons	Northbound entrance and southbound exit only Western terminus of route A38
Lane Cove River		2.4	1.5	Fullers Bridge	
Willoughby	Chatswood West–Chatswood boundary	3.6	2.2	Fullers Road (west) – Chatswood West	Eastern end of Millwood Avenue, western end of Fullers Road
Willoughby	Chatswood	4.6	2.9	Help Street (east) – Chatswood	Eastern end of Fullers Road
Willoughby	Chatswood	4.6	2.9	Pacific Highway (A1 south) – Artarmon, North Sydney	Concurrency with Pacific Highway
Willoughby–Ku-ring-gai boundary	Roseville	5.6	3.5	Pacific Highway (A1 north) – Pymble, Wahroonga, Berowra	Concurrency with Pacific Highway
Willoughby–Ku-ring-gai boundary	Roseville	5.6	3.5	Corona Avenue (west) – Roseville	Western end of Boundary Street
Willoughby–Ku-ring-gai boundary	Roseville	5.8	3.6	North Shore railway line	
Willoughby–Ku-ring-gai boundary	Roseville	7.2	4.5	Boundary Street (east) – Roseville Chase to Eastern Valley Way – Castlecrag	No right turn eastbound onto Babbage Road; Eastern end of Boundary Street, western end of Babbage Road
Ku-ring-gai	Roseville–Roseville Chase boundary	7.4	4.6	Clive Street (south) – Roseville Chase to Eastern Valley Way – Castlecrag	No left turn westbound onto Babbage Road
Middle Harbour		8.8	5.5	Roseville Bridge	
Northern Beaches	Frenchs Forest	12.6	7.8	Forest Way – Belrose	Access via service roads
Northern Beaches	Frenchs Forest	13.3	8.3	Wakehurst Parkway – North Narrabeen, Seaforth, Northern Beaches Hospital	Access via service roads
Northern Beaches	Brookvale–Dee Why boundary	17.9	11.1	Harbord Road (south) – Freshwater	
Northern Beaches	Brookvale–Dee Why boundary	17.9	11.1	Pittwater Road (A8) – Mona Vale, Narrabeen, Mosman	Eastern terminus of route A38; Eastern end of Warringah Road
Concurrency terminus; Incomplete access; Tolled; Route transition
