= Killarney Heights =

- Suburb
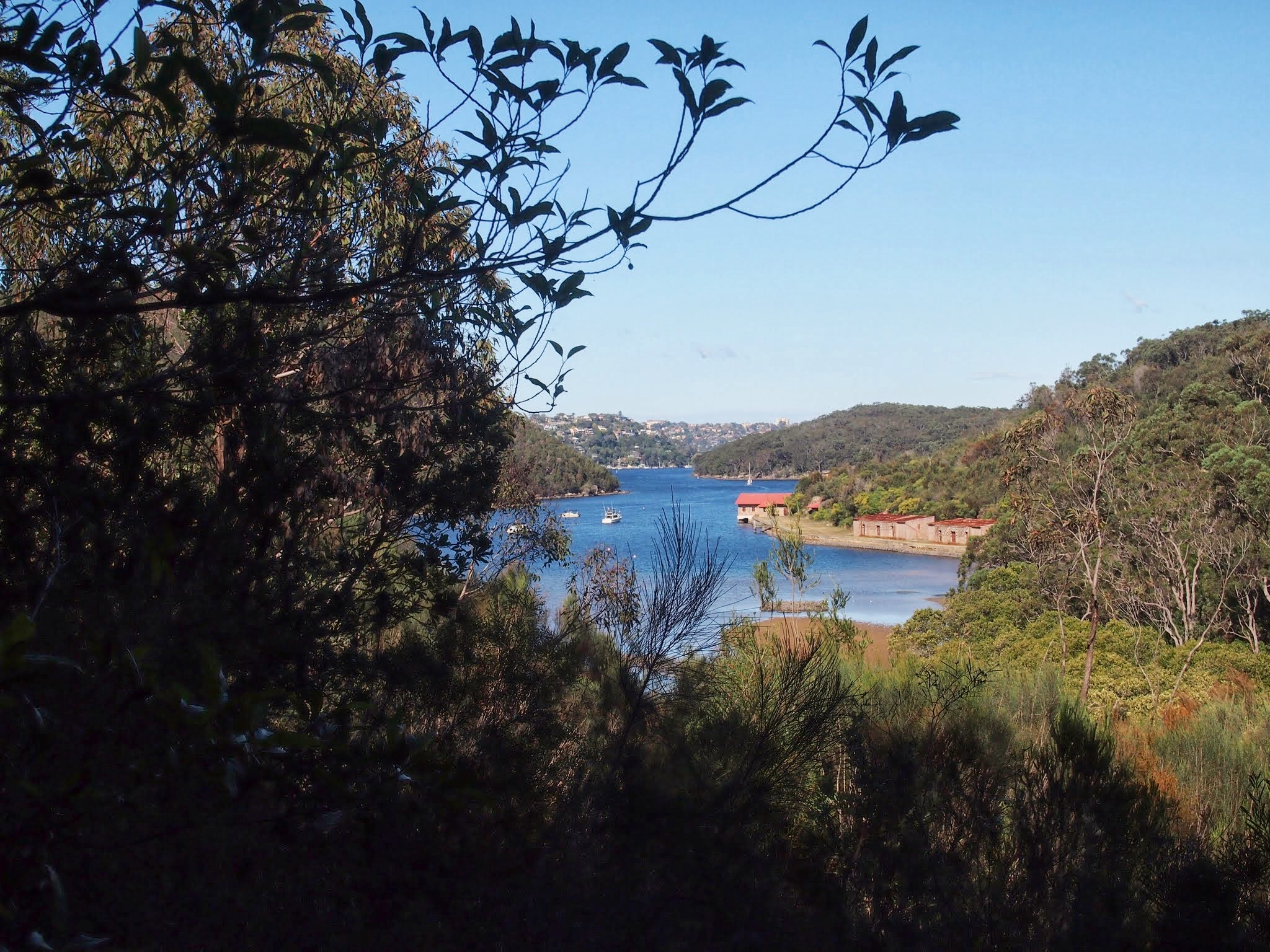
- The Bay Track

- Interactive map of Killarney Heights
- Country: Australia
- State: New South Wales
- City: Sydney
- LGA: Northern Beaches Council
- Location: 12 km (7.5 mi) north-east of Sydney CBD
- Established: 1960s

Government
  - State electorate: Wakehurst
  - Federal division: Mackellar
- Elevation: 109 m (358 ft)

Population
  - Total: 4,502 (2021 census)
- Postcode: 2087
Suburbs around Killarney Heights
East Lindfield	Forestville	Forestville
Roseville Chase	Killarney Heights	Allambie Heights
Castle Cove	Seaforth	Seaforth

Killarney Heights is a suburb of Northern Beaches, situated on Middle Harbour, in the state of New South Wales, Australia. Killarney Heights is 12 kilometres north-east of the Sydney central business district in the local government area of Northern Beaches Council. Killarney Heights is part of the Forest District, colloquially known as The Forest.

The suburb is located on a peninsula bound by the waters of Middle Harbour to the south-west towards Roseville Chase and Bantry Bay to the east. Garigal National Park is on the eastern border.

== Schools ==
There are two schools in Killarney Heights and many more around the area. Killarney Heights Primary School is situated across the road from Killarney Heights Oval. This primary school is noted as having an extensive English – French bilingual program which has led to many French-speaking parents moving to the area. A preschool is also nearby. Killarney Heights High School is situated next to the oval, and also has a strong French presence. The High School is a coeducational, comprehensive high school located on Starkey Street, the school has a strong tradition of high academic achievement, catering for individual student needs and providing a broad co-curricular program.

== Transport ==
Killarney Heights is accessible by road, via Warringah Road. Access to Warringah Road is via Roseville Bridge, via Spit Bridge and Wakehurst Parkway or via Forest Way. Killarney Heights is about a 20-minute drive from the city during non-peak hours.<refGoogle Maps (2026). "Killarney Heights, New South Wales 2087 to Sydney, New South Wales".</ref> The only public transport around this area is provided by bus company CDC NSW. Routes that go through Killarney Heights include services to and from the City and Chatswood.

== History ==
Prior to the arrival of the First Fleet, the area was inhabited by the Aboriginal Cadigal peoples. The name is from a town in County Kerry in southwest Ireland.

The suburb was originally part of Forestville and the area was developed from the 1950s as South Forestville and Heidelberg. The suburb east of Starkey Street became the site of considerable development by LJ Hooker in the early 1960s prior to the completion of the second Roseville Bridge in 1966. West of Starkey Street was Crown land.

Killarney Heights Post Office opened on 1 December 1965 and closed in 1987.

In February 1979, a Lithuanian couple who believed they were being chased by Soviet agents were discovered in bushland adjacent to the suburb. Stepan Petrosys (81) and his 68-year-old wife were discovered after having lived in a cave for 28 years. Local children who frequented the bush knew of these people as early as 1960.

A guide book called "Killarney Heights – Secrets of a Sleepy suburb" was published in November 2022.

== Heritage listings ==
Killarney Heights has a number of heritage-listed sites, including:

- Bantry Bay Explosives Depot
- Killarney Picnic Grounds
- Flat Rock Landing
- Soldiers Rock Landing
- Bantry Bay Reservoir
- Timber Getters Picnic Spot
- Old Bullock Track

== Population ==
=== Demographics ===
In the 2021 Census, there were 4,502 people in Killarney Heights. 63.8% of people were born in Australia. The most common countries of birth were England 6.3%, China 3.5%, France 2.7%, Hong Kong 2.1% and New Zealand 2.0%. 72.2% of people only spoke English at home. Other languages spoken at home included French 6.1%, Mandarin 3.9%, Cantonese 3.8%, Armenian 2.7% and Japanese 1.2%. The most common responses for religion were No Religion 42.8%, Catholic 21.3% and Anglican 14.3%.

=== Notable residents (past or present) ===
- Shioli Kutsuna, Japanese actress
