= Bare Creek =

River in New South Wales, Australia

Coordinates: 33°43′00″S 151°11′30″E

Bare
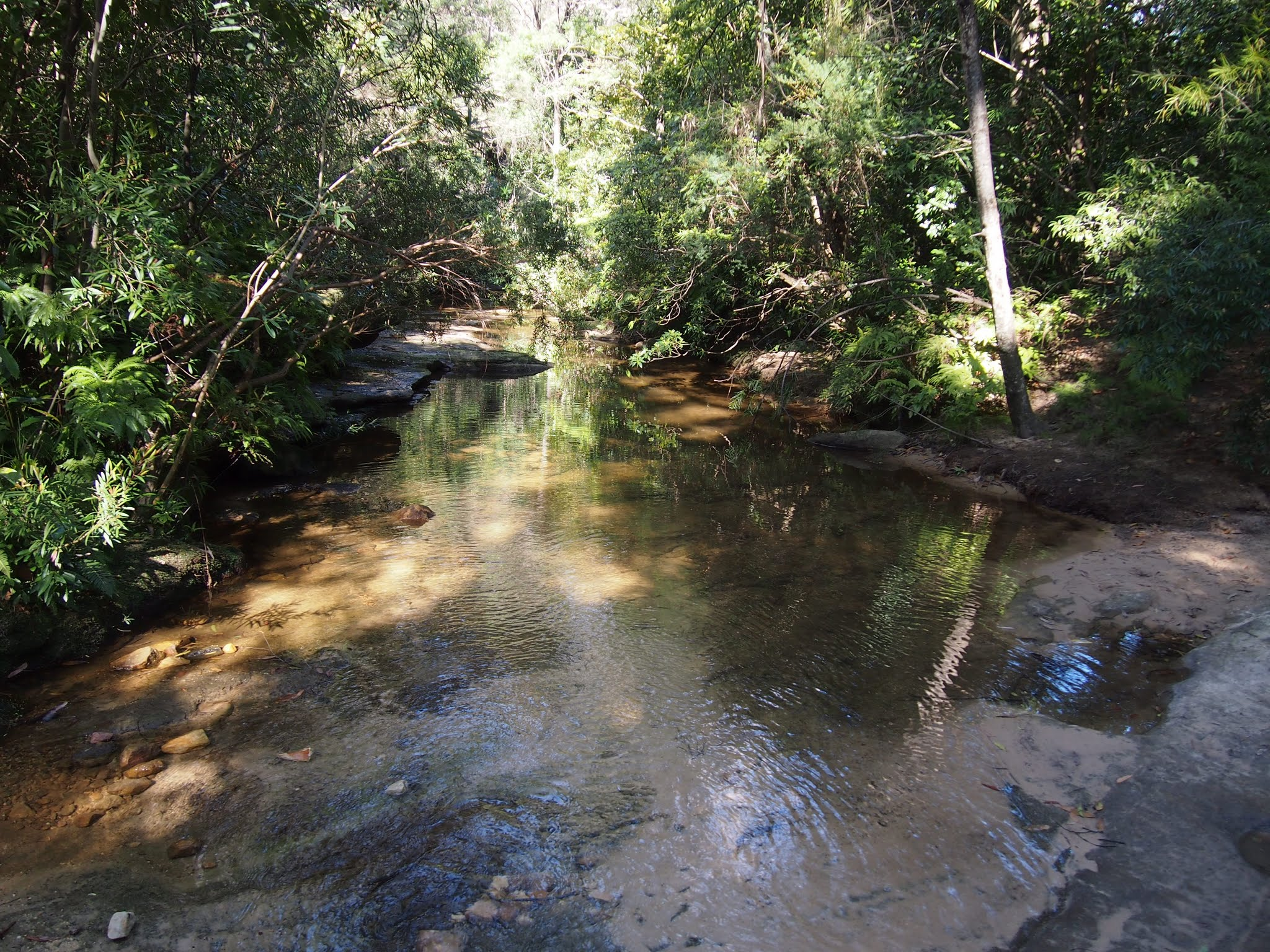
- Bare Creek

Location
- Country: Australia
- State: New South Wales
- Region: Sydney basin (IBRA), Northern Beaches
- Local government areas: Northern Beaches Council

Physical characteristics
- Source
  - location: between St Ives and Belrose
- Mouth: confluence with Frenchs Creek to form the Middle Harbour Creek
  - location: Davidson
- Length: 3 km (1.9 mi)
- Basin size: 550 km^{2} (210 sq mi)

Basin features
- River system: Middle Harbour catchment
- National park: Garigal National Park

Bare Creek is a watercourse that is part of the Middle Harbour catchment of Sydney Harbour that is located in the northern beaches region of Sydney, New South Wales, Australia.

== Course and features ==
Bare Creek rises in bushland in the north-western corner of Belrose. The main channel of the creek flows west through Garigal National Park, while the steep headwaters originate to the north of the sub-catchment, immediately south of Mona Vale Road. The creek flows generally west south-west before reaching its confluence with Frenchs Creek to form the Middle Harbour Creek, north of the suburb of Davidson. The creek has a course of 3 kilometres (1.9 mi).

Major land uses throughout the catchment area include the Austlink Business Park, low-medium residential development, non-urban bushland (outside the national park) and the Belrose Waste Management Facility. The sub-catchment is around 10 per cent impervious.

A mountain bike facility has been proposed for the catchment area surrounding Bare Creek.

== See also ==
- Rivers of New South Wales
- Pârâul Sterp, a river in Romania with a name literally translating as 'Bare Creek'
