= North Head, New South Wales =

Headland near Port Jackson, Australia

North Head Car-rang-gel
- Headland
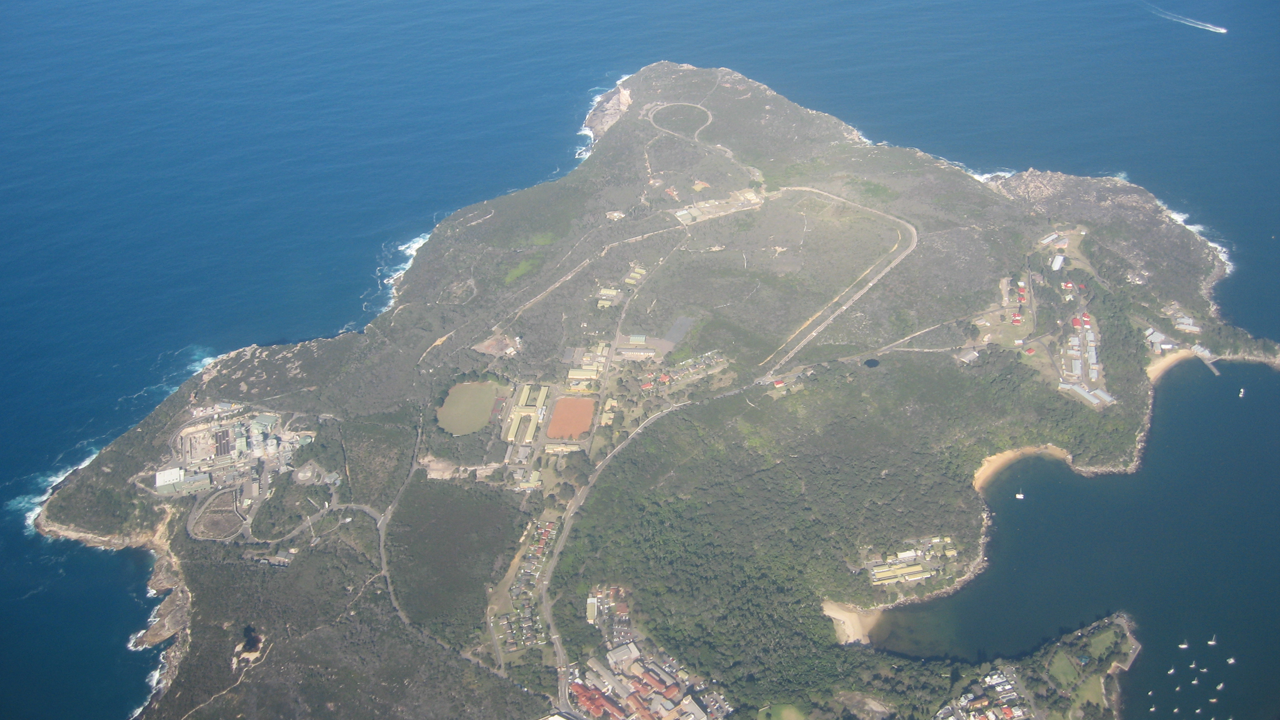
- Aerial view of North Head
- Interactive map of North Head
- Coordinates: 33°48′54″S 151°18′04″E
- Location: Port Jackson

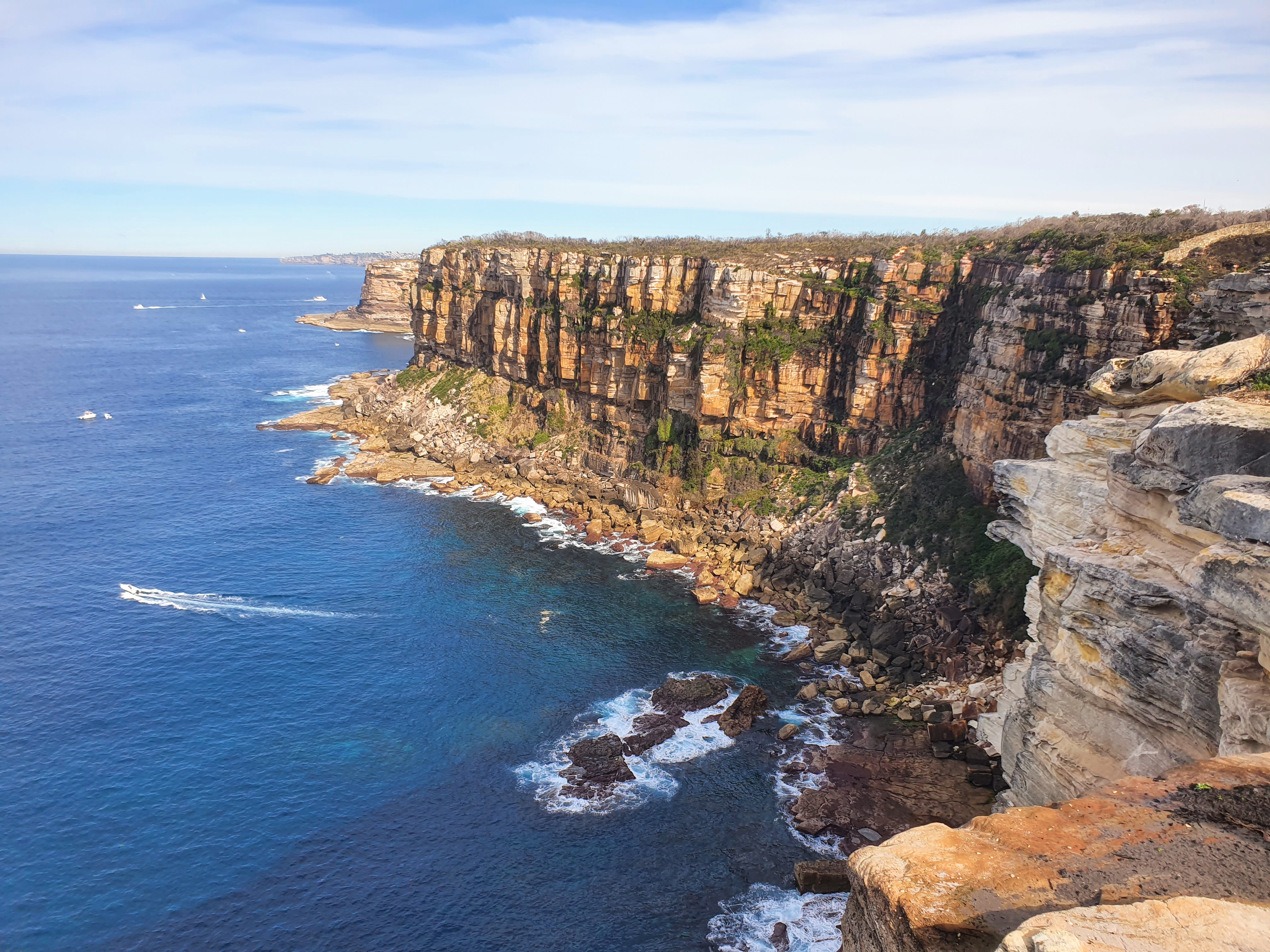
Views over the Rockface on North Head

North Head is a headland at Manly in Sydney, New South Wales, Australia, forming the northern side of the entrance to Port Jackson (Sydney Harbour). Known as Car-rang-gel, it has cultural significance for the Gayamagal people. Its sandstone cliffs and bushland surround former quarantine and military establishments, including the North Head Quarantine Station and North Fort.

Parts of the headland are within Sydney Harbour National Park, while North Head Sanctuary is managed by the Sydney Harbour Federation Trust. An area of North Head was added to the Australian National Heritage List in 2006. The headland also supports threatened ecological communities and wildlife populations.

== Geography ==
North Head is a remnant of the Hornsby Plateau, connected to the mainland by the sandspit at Manly. Sandstone cliffs border the headland, and elevated dunes occupy its central area. Its highest point is approximately 115 metres above sea level.

The National Heritage listing, gazetted on 12 May 2006, covers approximately 277 hectares in the southern part of the headland and expressly excludes the sewage treatment plant. The listing recognises the importance of the harbour entrance as a landmark for arrivals and departures since 1788, as well as North Head's quarantine history.

== History ==
=== Aboriginal history and early colonial contact ===
The Sydney Harbour Federation Trust identifies the Gayamagal people as North Head's traditional owners and records its use for ceremonies by Aboriginal healers. Archaeological evidence of Aboriginal occupation includes middens, rock art and burial sites. The Australian Museum records Car-rang-gel and Garungal as names for Inner North Head, and Boree for Outer North Head.

In 1788, Arthur Phillip and members of the First Fleet encountered Aboriginal people at nearby Manly Cove. The smallpox epidemic of 1789 caused extensive deaths among Aboriginal communities around Sydney Harbour. In 1790, Phillip was speared during an encounter with Aboriginal people gathered around a stranded whale in the Manly area. An early colonial land grant was made to Richard Cheers in 1810, south of what became Ashburner Street.

=== Quarantine ===
North Head's first recorded use for quarantine was in August 1828, when the convict transport Bussorah Merchant was detained after smallpox appeared among its crew. Following quarantine legislation in 1832, land around Spring Cove was reserved in 1833; the reserve was enlarged in 1837.

The station developed accommodation, hospital wards, a morgue and administrative buildings. Responsibility for quarantine passed from the states to the Commonwealth in 1909 under the Quarantine Act 1908. Its layout separated people by health status, passenger class and ethnicity. During the 1881 smallpox epidemic, additional hospital facilities and more restrictive internal boundaries were introduced.

The sandstone around the station preserves inscriptions made by people held in quarantine. A University of Sydney research project recorded more than 1,600 inscriptions, documenting the experiences of arrivals from different countries. The findings were published in Stories from the Sandstone in 2016.

The station also accommodated returning service personnel during both world wars, prisoners of war, evacuees from Cyclone Tracy in 1974 and Vietnamese refugees in 1975. It became part of Sydney Harbour National Park in 1984. Its buildings have subsequently been adapted for accommodation, conferences, dining and heritage interpretation as Q Station.

=== Military use and the Second World War ===
North Fort was established in 1936 as part of Sydney's coastal defences. During the Second World War it formed part of a system extending along approximately 300 kilometres of coastline. Its two 9.2-inch guns, served by about 200 metres of underground tunnels, had a range of 26.4 kilometres.

An underground plotting complex coordinated information about ships and supplied firing data to the guns. Eight metres below ground, it contained separate Fortress and Battery Plotting Rooms. Reports from coastal observation posts were transmitted by telephone and used to calculate target movements. Members of the Australian Women's Army Service worked in the complex during the war. The 9.2-inch guns remained at North Fort until 1952.

The Army School of Artillery operated at North Head from 1946 until 1998, when it moved to Puckapunyal, Victoria. The surviving barracks precinct includes Art Deco buildings arranged around a parade ground. The former defence site, cemetery and surrounding bushland became North Head Sanctuary, which the Harbour Trust opened to the public in 2007.

== Buildings and landmarks ==
=== Quarantine cemeteries and memorials ===
More than 240 people were buried in the Third Quarantine Cemetery between 1881 and 1925. They included nurse Annie Egan, who died of influenza on 3 December 1918 after caring for soldiers at the quarantine station. She was buried there with military honours.

The Constitution Monument commemorates the quarantine of the ship Constitution in 1855 and a reunion of surviving passengers and crew fifty years later. Sandstone boundary walls built by unemployment relief workers during the 1930s mark divisions between quarantine land and areas allocated to other uses. The Australian Memorial Walk at North Head Sanctuary commemorates Australian military service through a series of monuments and inscribed paving stones.

=== St Patrick's Estate ===
The estate originated in an 1859 land grant for a residence for the Catholic Archbishop of Sydney. St Patrick's Seminary, on the northern part of the headland, was constructed between 1885 and 1889 and opened in January 1889. Designed by Sheerin and Hennessy, the Gothic Revival building formed part of a Catholic ecclesiastical estate. Other buildings include the Archbishop's Residence, built in the 1880s, and the Cardinal Cerretti Memorial Chapel, completed in 1935. Seminary teaching moved elsewhere in 1995; the former college building subsequently became the campus of the International College of Management, Sydney.

=== Other institutions and infrastructure ===
The Australian Institute of Police Management has its campus at North Head. The site incorporates buildings associated with the former seamen's hospital. The former Manly Hospital closed in October 2018 when its services transferred to Northern Beaches Hospital. An Adolescent and Young Adult Hospice opened on part of the former hospital site in 2023.

North Head is also the terminus of the Northern Suburbs Ocean Outfall Sewer, constructed between 1916 and 1930. The sewage treatment plant was built between 1972 and 1984. The later construction of deep ocean outfalls at North Head, Bondi and Malabar formed part of Sydney's programme to discharge treated wastewater farther offshore.

=== Lookouts ===
The Fairfax walking track in Sydney Harbour National Park connects the Burragula and Yiningma lookouts. These overlook the harbour entrance and the coastal cliffs. Replacement lookout structures were designed following cliff instability, including a rockfall in 2016; a fire in 2020 also damaged fencing along the track. The new lookouts opened in June 2023. Their names mean “sunset” and “cliff edge”, respectively, and the rebuilt walk and viewing areas provide wheelchair access.

== Natural environment ==
North Head preserves a remnant of Eastern Suburbs Banksia Scrub, a critically endangered ecological community associated with old wind-deposited sand. Its vegetation includes banksias, tea-trees and other heathland shrubs. Much of this community's former extent elsewhere in Sydney has been lost to urban development.

The isolated North Head population of long-nosed bandicoots is listed as endangered in New South Wales. Predation by introduced animals and the loss and fragmentation of habitat are threats to bandicoots. The Manly area also supports the only mainland breeding colony of little penguins in New South Wales. The colony faces threats including introduced predators, dogs and boat strikes.

Conservation work at North Head Sanctuary has included the reintroduction of bush rats, eastern pygmy possums and brown antechinuses, together with monitoring and habitat management. On 17 October 2020, a hazard-reduction burn escaped containment. The fire burned about 62 hectares. Subsequent wildlife recovery work included providing artificial shelters and monitoring surviving and reintroduced animals.

== Death of Scott Johnson ==
On 10 December 1988, the body of 27-year-old American mathematician Scott Johnson was found below the cliffs at Bluefish Point. His death was initially treated as suicide. A third coronial inquest in 2017 concluded that he had died as a result of a gay-hate attack.

Scott White's 2022 murder conviction was overturned on appeal. He subsequently pleaded guilty to manslaughter and, in June 2023, was sentenced to nine years' imprisonment with a six-year non-parole period. The sentencing judge could not find beyond reasonable doubt that White's offence was motivated by gay hatred.

== Film and television ==
The quarantine station was used as a location for Bliss. The former St Patrick's Seminary, by then the International College of Management, Sydney, was used for The Great Gatsby (2013). Television productions filmed at North Head Sanctuary in 2017 included A Place to Call Home and Fighting Season.
