= Middle Harbour Creek =

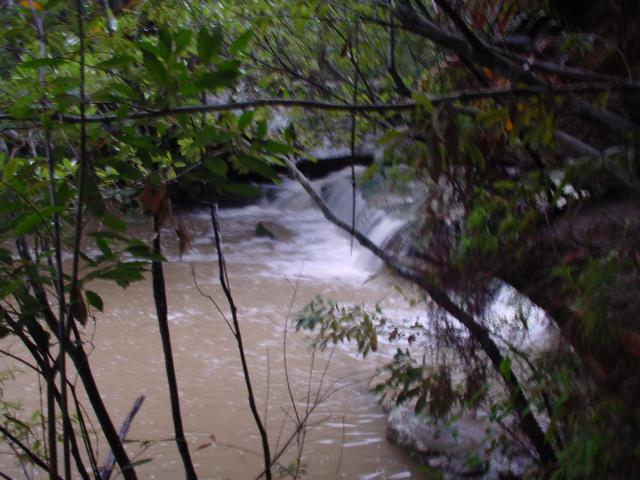
- Middle Harbour Creek after heavy storms downstream from the cascades

Location
- Country: Australia
- State: New South Wales
- Region: Sydney basin (IBRA), Northern Beaches
- Local government areas: Warringah

Physical characteristics
- Source confluence: Bare Creek and Frenchs Creek
  - location: north of Davidson
  - coordinates: 33°43′40.8″S 151°11′20.3994″E
- Mouth: Middle Harbour
  - location: Castlecrag and Seaforth
  - coordinates: 33°47′40.38″S 151°13′57.18″E
- Length: 6.1 km (3.8 mi)
- Basin size: 77 km^{2} (30 sq mi)

Basin features
- River system: Middle Harbour
- Tributaries
  - left: Carroll Creek
  - right: Two Creeks
- National park: Garigal National Park

Middle Harbour Creek, a tributary of Middle Harbour, is a youthful tide-dominated, drowned-valley estuary north–west of Sydney Harbour, in Sydney, New South Wales, Australia.

== Ecology ==
Formed by the confluence of Bare Creek and Frenchs Creek, north of Davidson, Middle Harbour Creek is in the Garigal National Park and flows from Mona Vale Road in the north down to Bungaroo, where the creek becomes Middle Harbour. Its catchment area is approximately 77 square kilometres (30 sq mi).

Access along the majority of the creek is easy with tracks from (the western shore) St Ives, East Killara, East Lindfield, (eastern shore) Belrose, Davidson, Frenchs Forest and Forestville. Day walks are popular with access to the creek along several well maintained fire trails, the better-known being the Bungaroo Track, Cascades Track, and Bare Creek track. The bushland surrounding the creek is rich in bloodwoods (Eucalyptus gummifera), scribbly gums (Eucalyptus haemastoma), and the narrow-leaved stringy bark (Eucalyptus oblonga).

== History ==
Middle Harbour Creek was first explored by Governor Arthur Phillip on an expedition from Manly Cove on 15 April 1788. The intention of the expedition was to discover food. The expedition camped on 16 April at Bungaroo, where the tidal Middle Harbour finishes and the creek begins.

== Access ==
- Pipeline Track (St Ives) starts on near the Barra Brui Scout Hall on Hunter Avenue
- Bungaroo Track (St Ives) branches off the Pipeline Track, just after Founders Way
- Cascades Track (St Ives) runs from the corner of Acron Road and Douglas Street, St Ives or Stone Parade, Frenchs Forest. The track is a well maintained fire trail with an extremely steep cemented section and a creek crossing (from the St Ives side) at a ford before reaching the cascades, which is a beautiful cascading of water over sandstone. Until the 1970s the Cascades was a popular swimming water hole with local children. There are several sandstone caves in the area..
- Lyre Bird Track (Roseville) starts at the end of Davidson Reserve
- Two Creeks Track (Roseville) can be accessed from Babbage Road, Ormonde Road or Wellington Road (East Lindfield)
- Access track (unnamed) from the end of Koola Avenue, East Lindfield
- Bare Creek Track (Belrose) runs from close to Austlink Corporate Park on the intersection of Mona Vale Road and Forest Way Road. The trail is overgrown and often difficult to find at that location. The best way to find the track is by following the trail from the end of Wyatt Avenue around the back of Sydney East Substation to find the Heath Track which meets the Bare Creek Track after a short walk.

It is possible to follow the entire length of Middle Harbour Creek, or to do a circular bushwalk that covers the majority of its length on both sides of the creek.

== Gallery ==
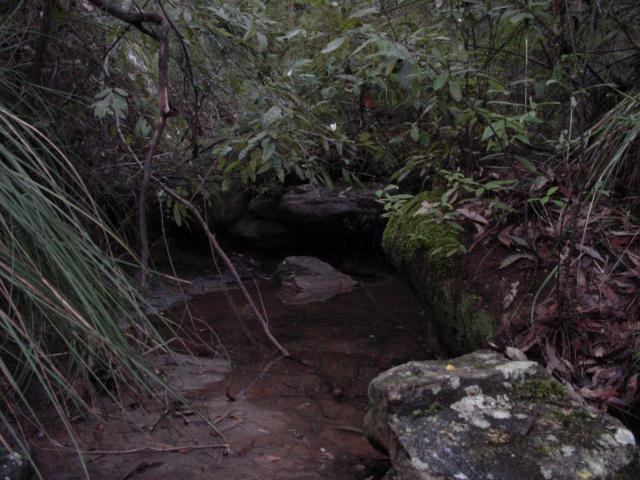
Middle Harbour Creek close to the source near Mona Vale Road St Ives.
