= Chislehurst (disambiguation) =

Chislehurst is a district of south-east London, England.

Chislehurst may also refer to:

- Chislehurst (electoral division), a former Greater London Council electoral division
- Chislehurst (constituency), a former UK Parliament constituency
- Chislehurst (ward), a Bromley London Borough Council electoral ward
- Chislehurst, Chatswood, a former house and school building in Sydney, Australia
