= Mona Vale Hospital =

Defunct hospital in Sydney, Australia

- Northern Sydney Local Health District
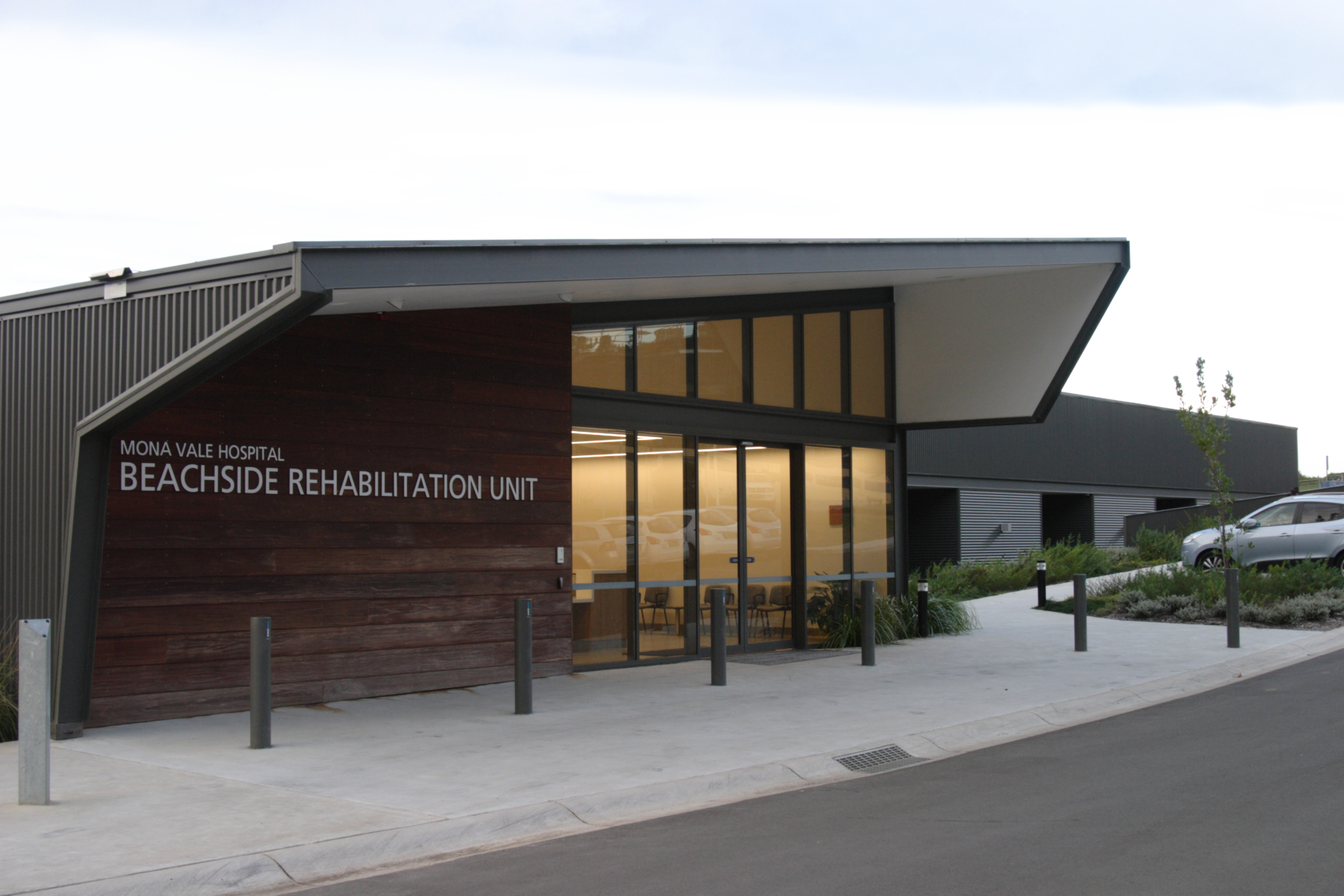
- Mona Vale Hospital's Beachside Rehabilitation Centre, opened in 2014.

Geography
- Location: Mona Vale, Sydney, New South Wales, Australia
- Coordinates: 33.6855°S 151.3067°E

Organisation
- Care system: Public Medicare (AU)
- Type: District General
- Affiliated university: University of Sydney

Helipads
- Helipad: (ICAO: YXMV)
Number	Length		Surface
Number	ft	m	Surface
1			concrete

History
- Founded: 1964

Links
- Website: Official Website
- Lists: Hospitals in Australia

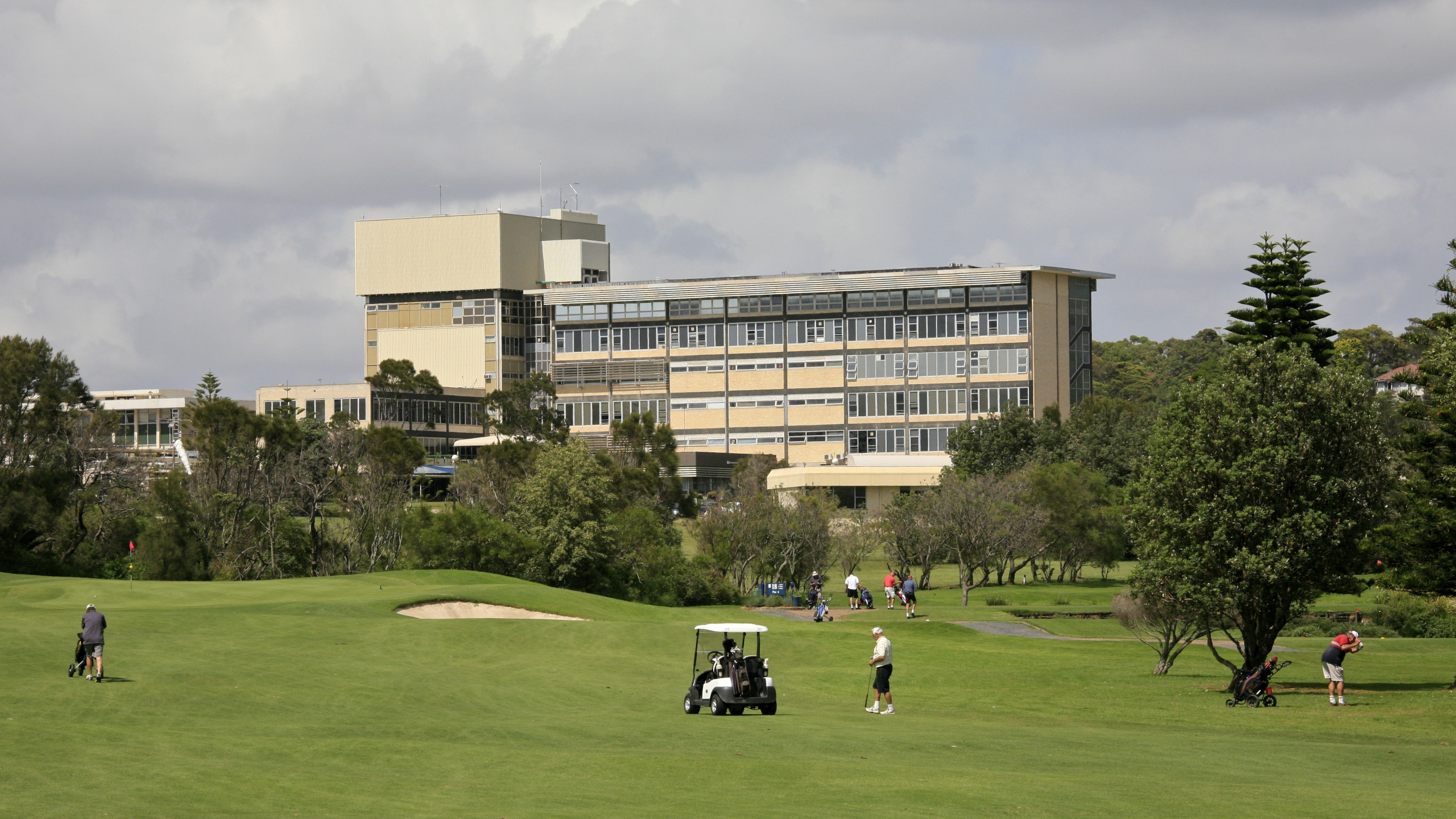
Mona Vale Hospital, viewed from the adjacent Mona Vale Golf Course, pre-2021.

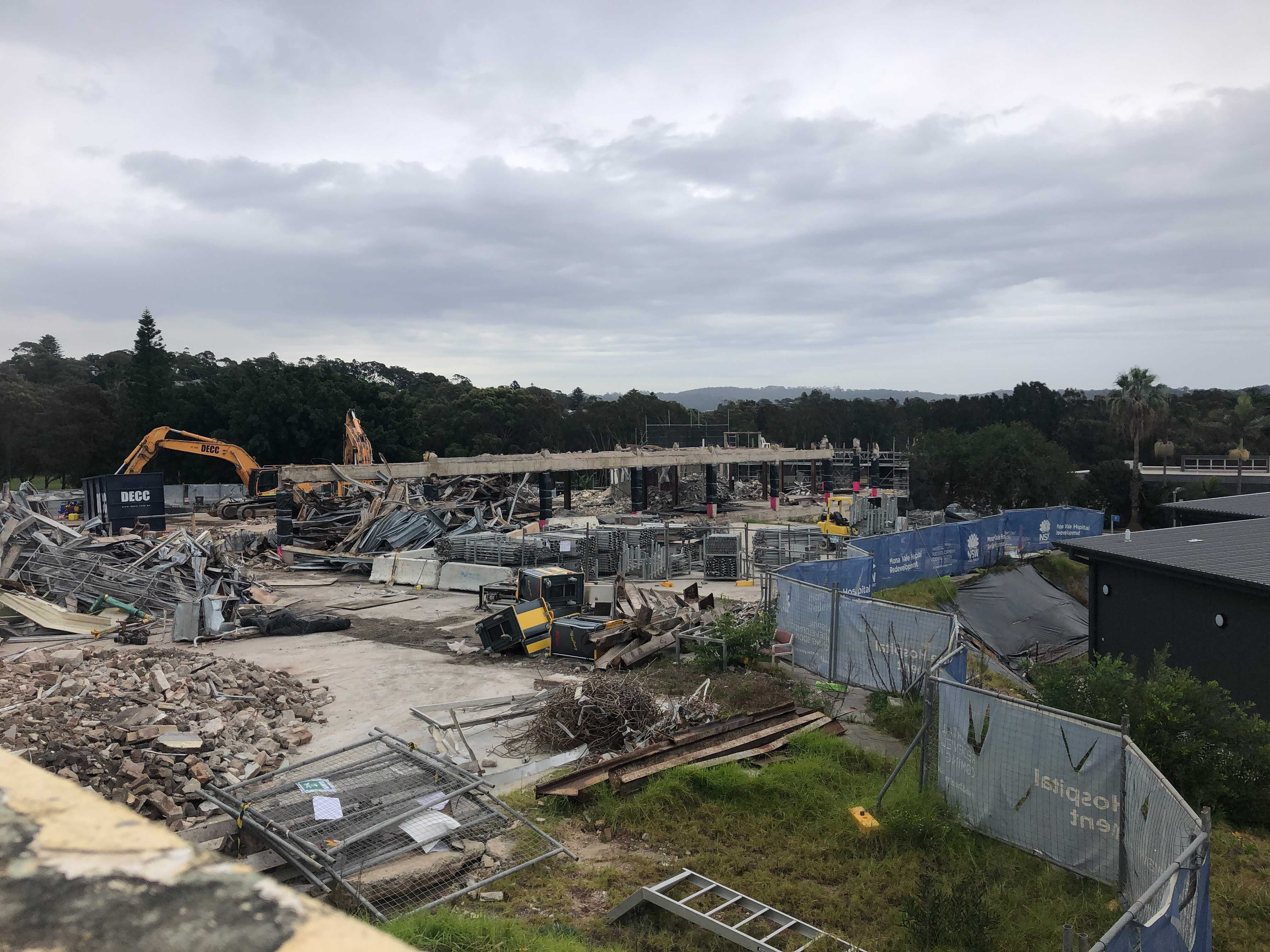
Demolition works on the site of the former Mona Vale hospital, June 2021

Mona Vale Hospital is located in the suburb of Mona Vale, on the Northern Beaches of metropolitan Sydney, Australia. It is a public hospital managed by New South Wales Health, and part of the Northern Sydney Local Health District.

The hospital was incorporated on 21 November 1958 under the Public Hospitals Act 1929, and opened on 22 February 1964 by the then Minister for Health, William Francis Sheahan. It initially accommodated 152 inpatients, with acute specialty services in Emergency Medicine, Intensive Care, General Surgery, Orthopaedic Surgery, Obstetrics and Gynaecology, General Medicine, General Paediatrics, Geriatrics, Rehabilitation and Palliative Care. The Accident and Emergency department opened shortly thereafter, on 23 March 1964. Finally, in 1975, a 43-bed paediatric unit was opened on level six, replacing a staff canteen.

In October 2018, the majority of acute specialty services were transferred to the newly built, semi-private Northern Beaches Hospital. As a result, Mona Vale Hospital was redeveloped to include a range of sub-acute inpatient services, including geriatric, rehabilitation and palliative care, as well as the establishment of an outpatient community health centre for allied health and nursing reviews. The hospital features a 24-hour urgent care centre equivalent to a level one emergency department.

A February 2020 report into the poor performance of the Northern Beaches Hospital recommended restoring the status of Mona Vale Hospital to a "Level Three" emergency department but this was rejected by the NSW Government.

In September 2020, the NSW Government confirmed its plans to demolish the main hospital building because it contained asbestos, despite significant local opposition. Demolition works began in 2021 and by May 2021 the main hospital building had been completely removed.

== Urgent Care Centre ==
In 2019, the hospital's former Emergency Department was re-purposed into a 24-hour Urgent Care Centre, intended to assess and treat minor illnesses and injuries on an outpatient basis. It was staffed by experienced medical practitioners with backgrounds in emergency medicine and/or general practice, who work alongside registered nurses and physiotherapists. Additionally, there are pathology and X-ray services available on-site during extended daytime hours. Patients at Mona Vale Hospital requiring further medical assessment and/or a higher level of care are traditionally transferred via ambulance to Royal North Shore Hospital, Sydney Children's Hospital or Northern Beaches Hospital. Since its opening in October 2018, the urgent care centre sees an average of about 50 to 80 patients daily, with about 6% of them requiring onwards transfer to other facilities.

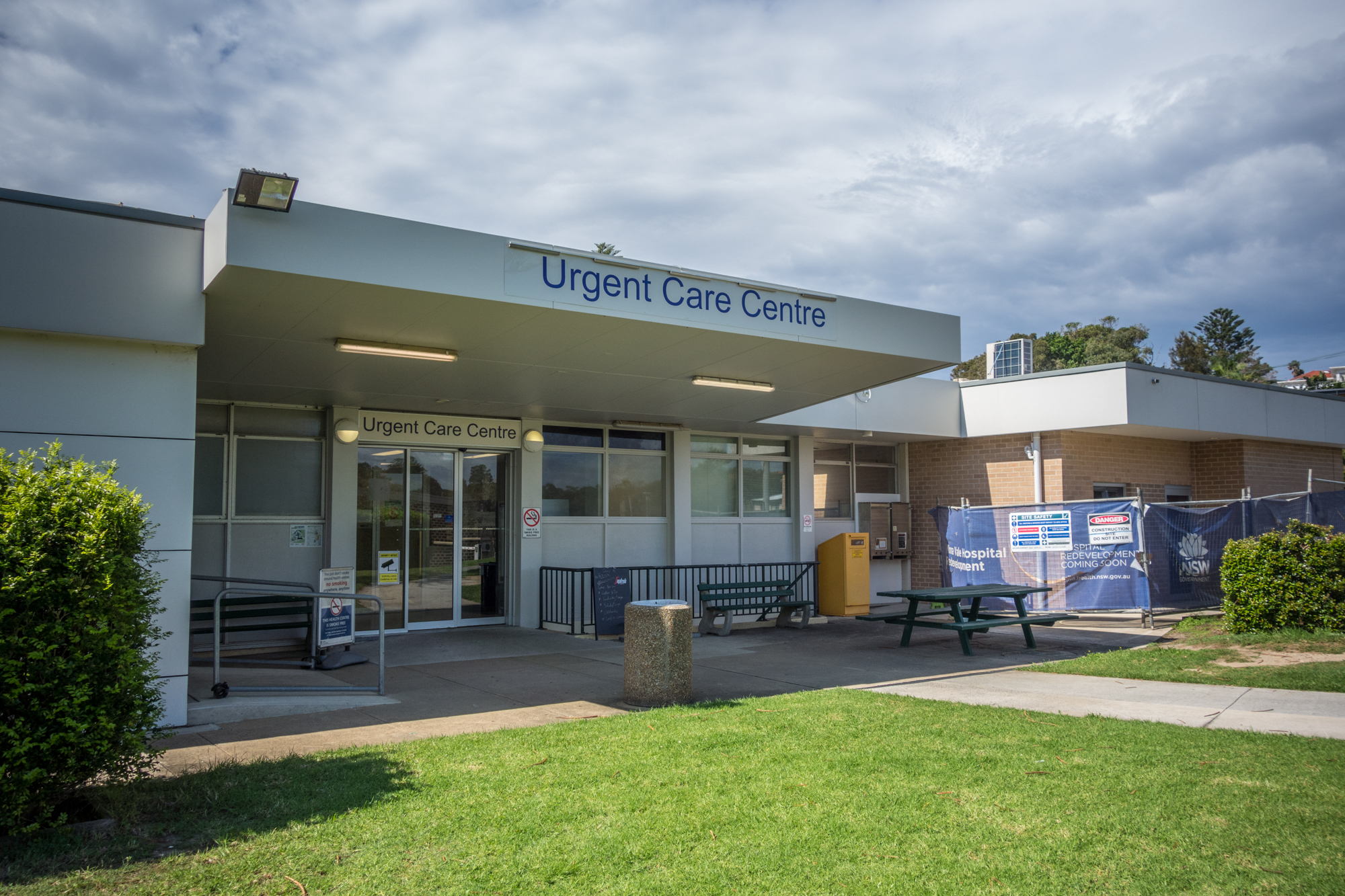
Mona Vale Urgent Care Centre c.2019, Mona Vale, NSW, Australia

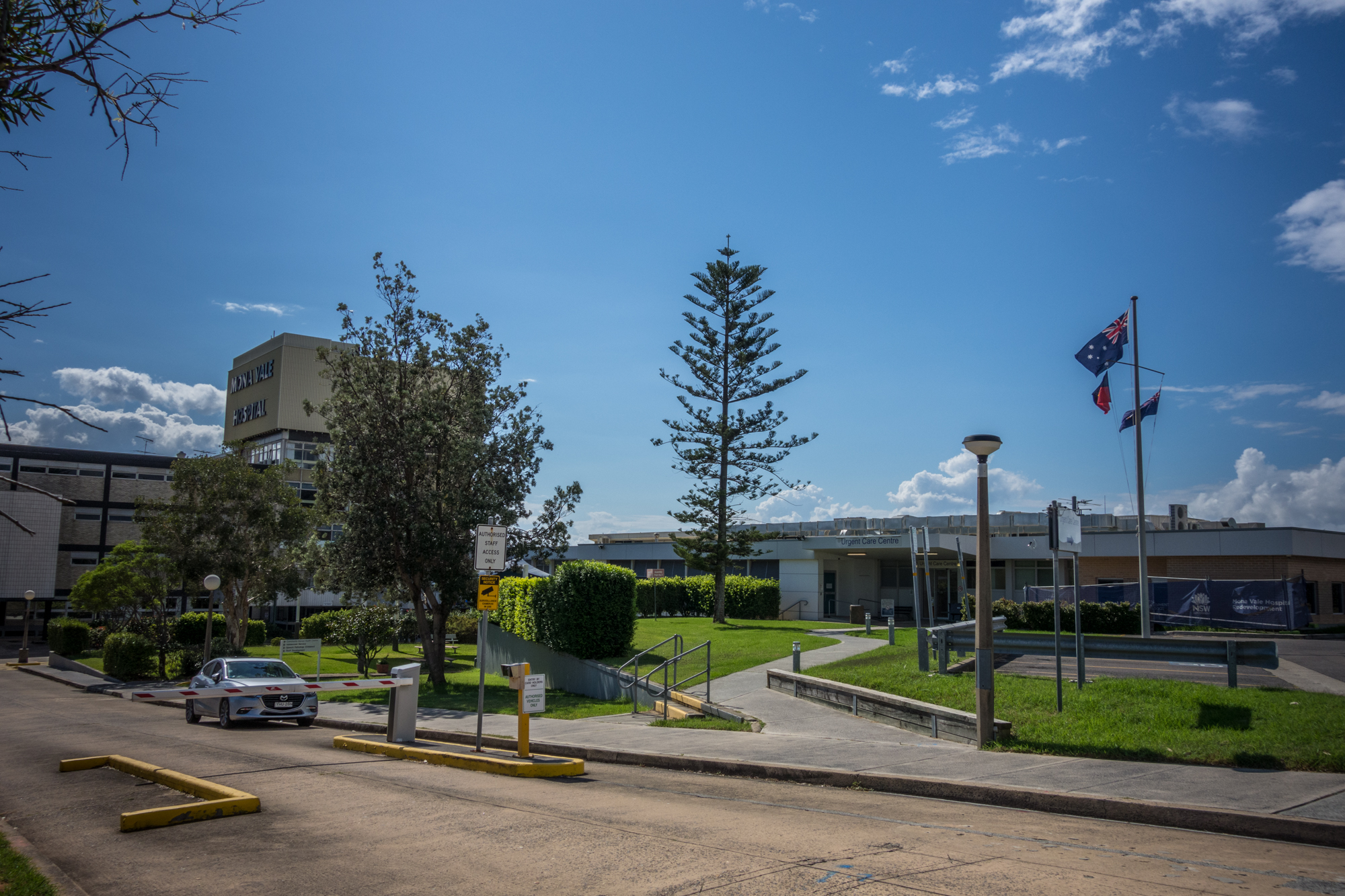
Mona Vale Urgent Care Centre c.2019, Mona Vale, NSW, Australia

== See also ==
- List of hospitals in Australia
