= Roseville Chase =

- Suburb
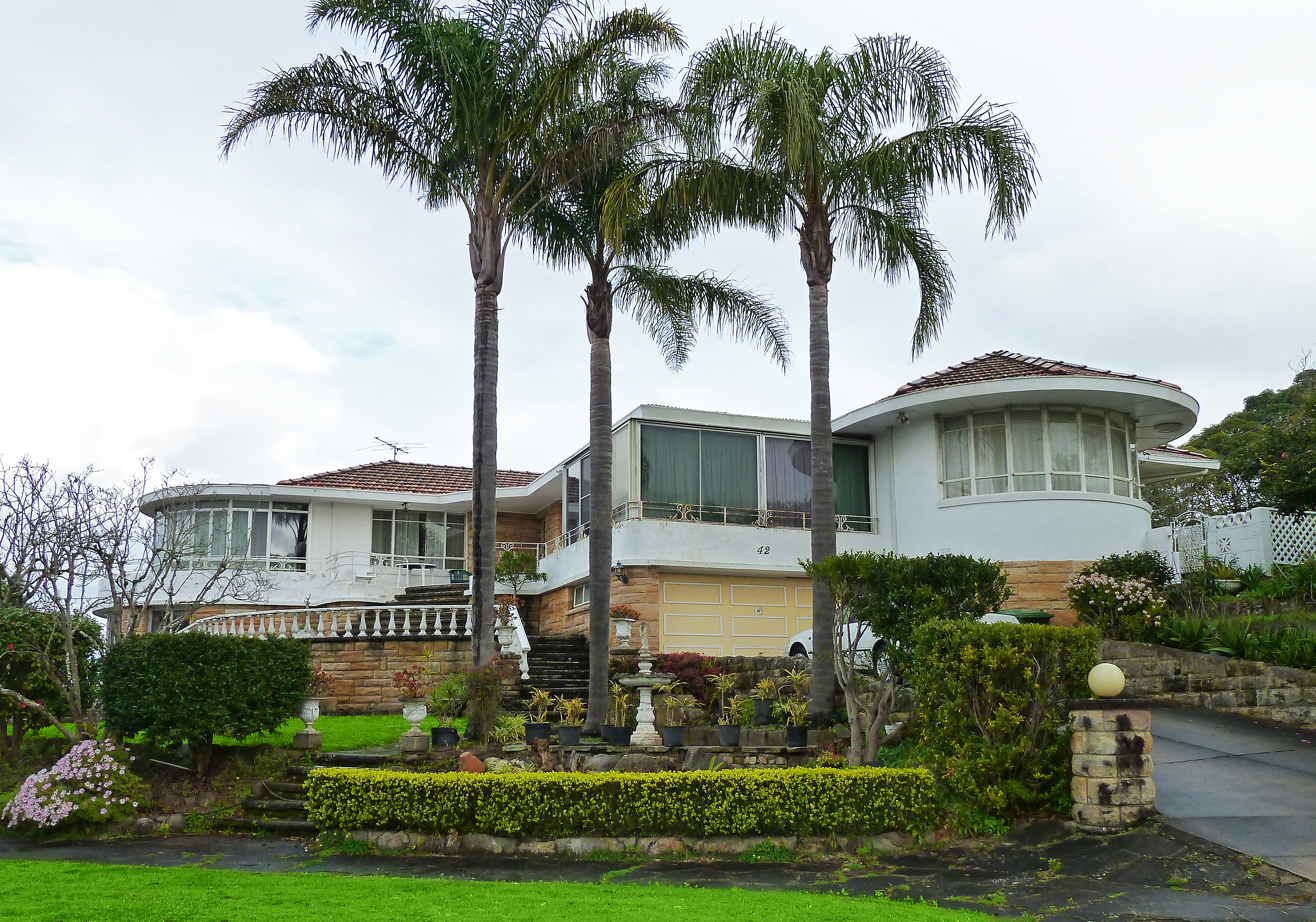
- Suburban house in Roseville Chase

- Interactive map of Roseville Chase
- Country: Australia
- State: New South Wales
- City: Sydney
- LGA: Ku-ring-gai Council
- Location: 11 km (6.8 mi) north-west of Sydney CBD

Government
  - State electorate: Davidson
  - Federal division: Bradfield
- Elevation: 81 m (266 ft)

Population
  - Total: 1,618 (2021 census)
- Postcode: 2069
Suburbs around Roseville Chase
Lindfield	East Lindfield	Forestville
Roseville	Roseville Chase	Killarney Heights
Chatswood West	Chatswood	Castle Cove

Roseville Chase is a suburb on the Upper North Shore of Sydney in the state of New South Wales, Australia 11 kilometres north-west of the Sydney central business district, in the local government area of Ku-ring-gai Council. Roseville is a separate suburb to the west.

== Location ==
Located on Middle Harbour at its uppermost reaches, Roseville Chase is a secluded and bushy suburb. There are two main geographical and socio-economic subdivisions in Roseville Chase. The Chase Lowlands are centred on lower confines south of the mighty Roseville Bridge, while the Chase Heights are centred around the elegant Ormonde Rd, offering commanding views down to the harbour and beyond. These subdivisions are more well known as Upper Chase and Lower Chase. North of Warringah Road (Upper Chase), the residential development is lighter and is largely surrounded by bushland. The area is defined by the gully of Moores Creek to the west and north, plus Middle Harbour to the east. Much of the surrounding bushland is contained within Garigal National Park.

== History ==
The area was originally inhabited by Aboriginal people, who left their mark in the form of hand stencils that can be seen in rock shelters in the area.

Captain Arthur Phillip's search for "good land, well watered" led to the discovery and colonisation of the rough shores of Roseville Chase, where Samuel Bates built a farm at Echo Point on the edge of what is now Middle Harbour.

Later, the area was settled by Europeans like David Mathew and Richard Archbold, whose property eventually extended to Moores Creek and became the site of an orchard.

During World War I the area was used as a training area for army engineers under the command of Sir John Madsen.

Many people lived in the Sydney bush during the Great Depression. Remains of dwellings can still be found in the bush at Roseville Chase.

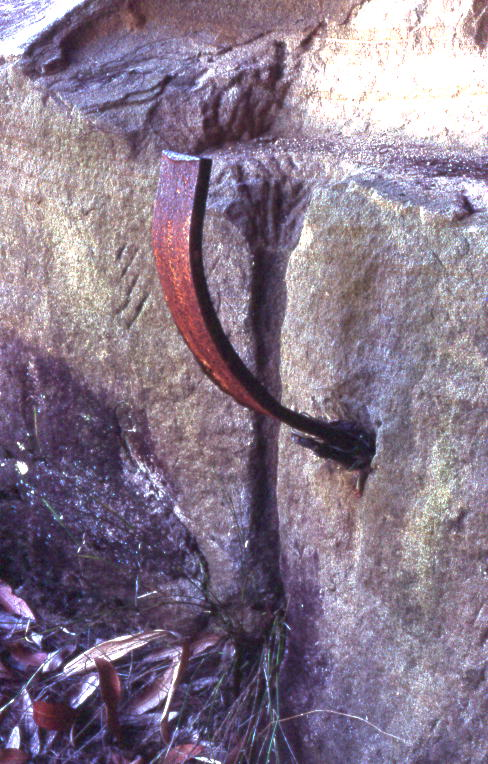
Remains of a bush dwelling

Roseville Chase Post Office opened on 2 March 1953 and closed in 1994.

== Population ==
In the 2021 Census, there were 1,618 people in Roseville Chase, of whom 65.7% were born in Australia, 74.0% of whom spoke only English at home. The most common responses for religion were No Religion, so stated 39.7%, Catholic 24.4%, and Anglican 14.4%.
