= Roseville Bridge =

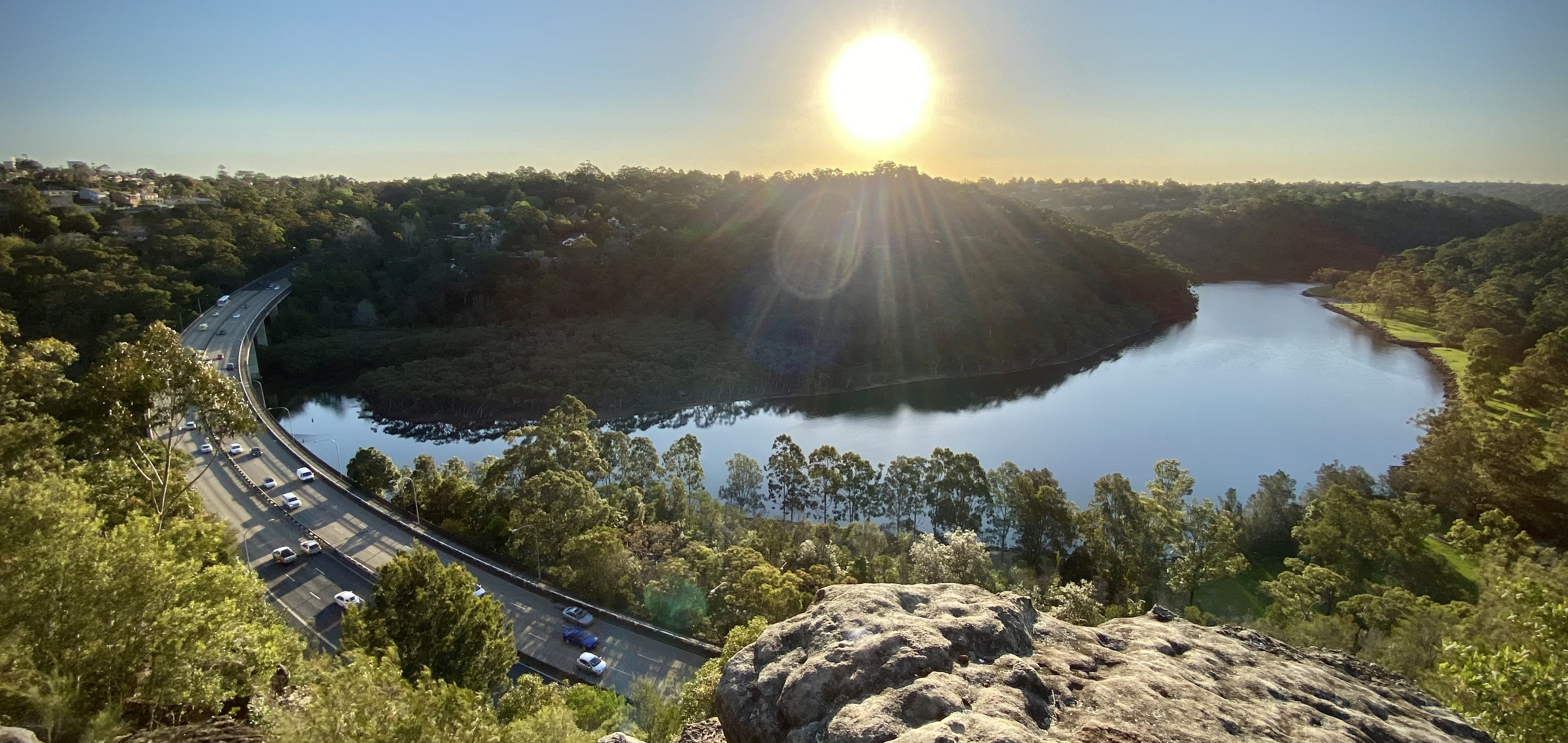
- View from Killarney Heights to Roseville
- Coordinates: 33°46′23″S 151°12′13″E
- Carries: Warringah Road: Motor vehicles; Grade-separated shared pedestrian footpath and cycleway
- Crosses: Middle Harbour
- Locale: Roseville Chase, New South Wales, Australia
- Begins: Roseville Chase (south)
- Ends: Forestville (north)
- Maintained by: Transport for NSW
- Followed by: Spit Bridge

Characteristics
- Design: Box girder
- Material: Pre-stressed concrete
- Total length: 377 metres (1,237 ft)
- Clearance above: 17.4 metres (57 ft)
- No. of lanes: 6: 3 northbound; 3 southbound

History
- Construction cost: A$1.64 million
- Opened: 2 April 1966 by Robert Askin, NSW Premier
- Replaces: Old Roseville Bridge (1924–1974)

Statistics
- Daily traffic: 65,000 (2016)

Location
- Interactive map of Roseville Bridge

The Roseville Bridge is a pre-stressed concrete box girder road bridge that carries Warringah Road, part of the A38 across Middle Harbour, located adjacent to the suburb of Roseville Chase, in Sydney, New South Wales, Australia. The bridge is one of two crossings of Middle Harbour, the other being the Spit Bridge.

== Current bridge ==
The suburbs east of Middle Harbour grew rapidly in the years following the opening of the inaugural Roseville Bridge. On 2 April 1966, the Liberal Premier Robin Askin, the local Member for Collaroy, officially opened the new six-lane, high-level bridge, in a ceremony attended by several hundred people, including Pat Morton (Minister for Local Government and Highways), Milton Morris (Minister for Transport), Dick Healey (Member for Wakehurst), Harry Jago (Member for Gordon), and J. A. L. Shaw (Commissioner for Main Roads).

Built at a cost of A$1.64 million, the bridge was designed by the Department of Main Roads, with architects Fowell, Mansfield & Maclurcan being design consultants on the project; the primary contractor was John Holland (Constructions) Pty Ltd. The bridge is 377 metres (1,237 ft) long and has a clearance of 17.4 metres (57 ft) from the water below. However, the adjacent Pipe Bridge has a clearance of only 11 metres (36 ft). This limitation, combined with only 1.5 metres (4 ft 11 in) depth of water, make it out of reach for most cruising vessels. Along with the bridge, a significant upgrade of the approach roads was completed, which became the six-lane Warringah Road. This upgraded section of road is approximately 2 kilometres (1.2 mi) long.

Today Roseville Bridge is part of a major thoroughfare from the Pacific Highway at Roseville to the Northern Beaches and suburbs east of Middle Harbour. Due to the halt of the construction of the Warringah Expressway across Middle Harbour to Wakehurst Parkway and the Burnt Bridge Creek Deviation, which is the only part of the Warringah Expressway built on the Northern Beaches by the Labor Wran government, there are today only two other major roads to these areas: Mona Vale Road, and Spit Road which crosses Middle Harbour downstream from Roseville Bridge using the Spit Bridge.

The road carries three lanes of traffic towards Roseville Chase and three lanes of traffic towards Forestville. A grade-separated shared pedestrian footpath and cycleway is located on the western side of the bridge.

On 8 March 2022, torrential rain and inadequate drainage led to the bridge being dubbed the new "Roseville Aqueduct" with images showing floating cars and waterfall edge.

== Former Roseville Bridge, 1924–1974 ==
Old Roseville Bridge
- Coordinates: 33°46′27″S 151°12′19″E
- Carried: Babbage Road; Warringah Road
- Crossed: Middle Harbour
- Locale: Roseville, Sydney, New South Wales, Australia
- Followed by: Roseville Bridge

Characteristics
- Design: Low-level bridge
- Material: Concrete
- Total length: 240 feet (73 m)
- Longest span: 40 feet (12 m)
- No. of spans: 6
- Piers in water: 5
- No. of lanes: 2

History
- Designer: R. S. Morris
- Constructed by: John Howie and Sons
- Construction cost: A£8548
- Opened: 20 September 1924
- Collapsed: 1974
- Closed: 1966
- Replaced: Ferry
- Replaced by: Roseville Bridge (since 1966)

An original bridge across Middle Harbour at Roseville was built jointly by the Willoughby, Ku-ring-gai and Warringah councils; with fifty percent of the funding provided by the NSW Government. It was built of reinforced concrete by unemployed returned servicemen and opened on 20 September 1924. It was claimed to be the longest bridge of that type in NSW although the bridge across the Hawkesbury River at North Richmond was longer. It was claimed to be the first bridge supported on reinforced concrete piles. This low-level two-lane bridge was located downstream of the current bridge, and connected Babbage Road to what is today called Healey Way, which is the entrance to Davidson Park within Garigal National Park. The first bridge replaced an earlier ferry service consisting of rowing boats across the narrowest section of water.

The 1924 bridge survived the opening of the new bridge, and provided pedestrian access only, until it was demolished in 1974, along with Roseville Baths. Almost nothing remains from these structures.

== See also ==
- List of bridges in Sydney
