= Bungaroo =

- Cadastral division
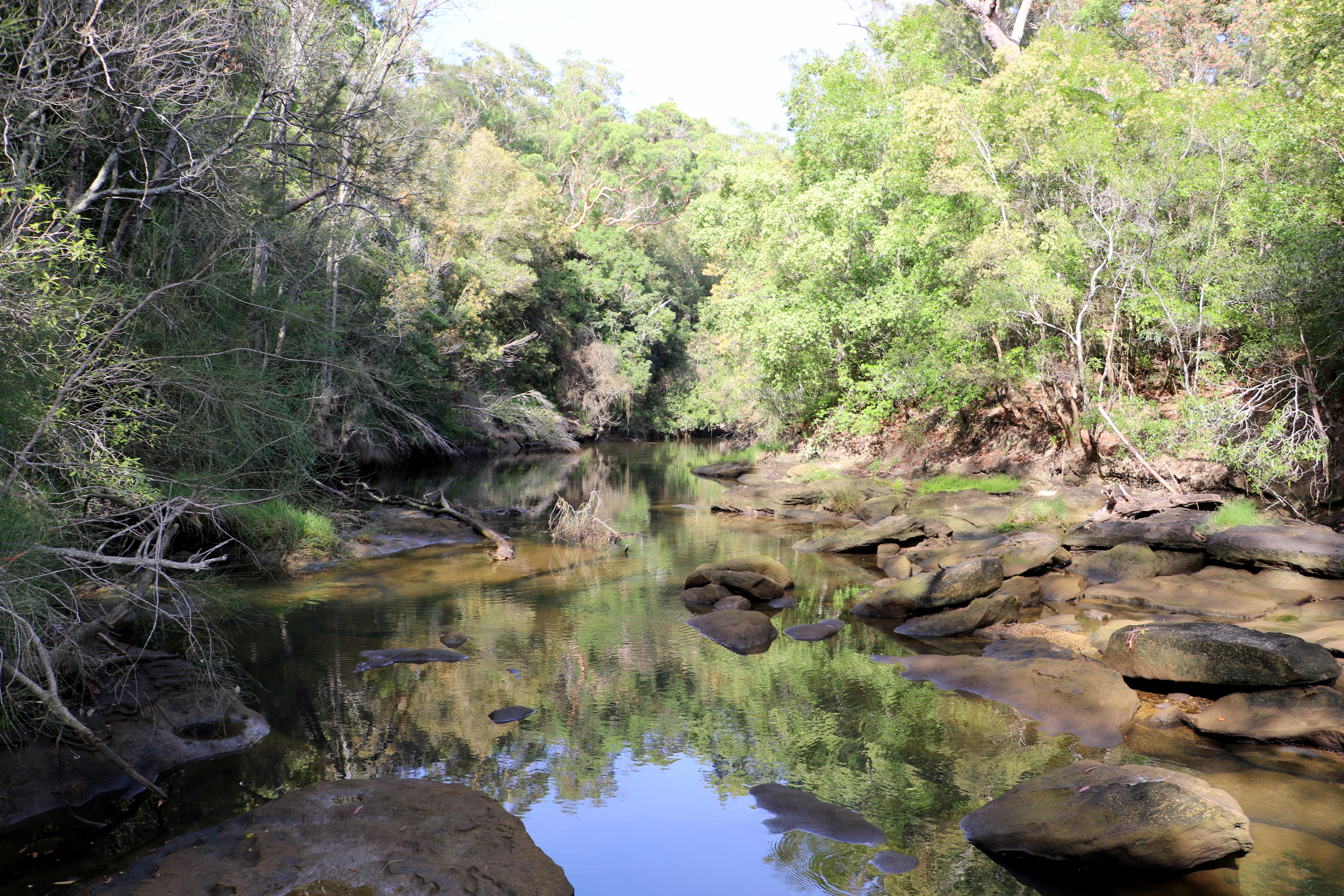
- Bungaroo (looking downstream)

- Coordinates: 33.7443°S 151.1860°E
- Country: Australia
- State: New South Wales

Bungaroo is a locality near St. Ives, Sydney, Australia. The location is thought to be the site where Governor Arthur Phillip and party camped on the night of 16 April 1788 on the first of many expeditions intended to find arable land that could supply the Colony with agricultural products. The colony at Sydney Cove was dependent on supplies from England, but the soils around the harbour were too poor to support crops and sustain the Colony.

== History ==
Captain Phillip and party landed at Manly on 15 April 1788, named the location, and then proceeded westwards until they struck Middle Harbour perhaps somewhere near the present Roseville Bridge. Arthur Phillip, David Collins, George Johnston, Surgeon White, one soldier and one sailor then proceeded up that waterway to the tidal limit, arrived at about four in the afternoon and camped besides a freshwater pool that night. Surgeon White described the area as ...the most desert wild and solitary seclusion the imagination can form any idea of.... In 1885, the area was surveyed and subdivided, as part of the St. Ives division. The creek valley remained unsettled, although the location of the tidal limit was noted and a surveyors' line subsequently became an informal track. A proposal to construct a railway line along the creek valley was thwarted in the 1920s by protests by local residents and councillors. By the 1930s the area was a well known picnic, bushwalking and beauty spot, with a popular swimming hole at The Cascades, constructed by unemployment relief workers during the Great Depression. Within living memories, now-older people used to refer to going to the Cascades pool ( at 33°43'40.85"S, 151°11'18.35"E ), a once popular creek swimming pool before water quality declined, as going to Bungaroo. Mentions of such occur in Gal Halstead's 1982 large compilation "The Story of St. Ives", in which she gathered the family stories of many St Ives inhabitants. There is no known reason for a move of place name to where Bungaroo is now shown on maps and street directories. Therefore, one possible explanation for this is that "Bungaroo" could be an original designation of the creek (Middle Harbour Creek), not just a specific spot along it. The book shows many uses of the name, back to 1909, meaning what is now called the Cascades pools. This was a favourite place for the early St. Ives children. The accounts of it in the book include that 'Snow' Bedwin recalled relief workers building the road down to it in the "Depression in the 1920's"; that "Ali" Bartho caught the biggest death adder ever seen in the district there "which was presented to the Sydney Museum with 'some ceremony' "; that a Scout Jamboree was held there at which a huge bonfire of twigs doused in kerosene was ignited by some scouts on the opposite hill sending down a flaming torch to ignite it, sliding on a wire; that the WWII troops stationed at St. Ives Showground used it; and that the swimming pool there "became polluted and the barrier had to be blown up by the local council". A meaning of 'Bungaroo' given in the book is 'Resting place'; but others have suggested it could be an Aboriginal name for the Salt Water Turtle, or mean 'running water'.

== Description ==
The Bungaroo area is part of Garigal National Park and is managed by the New South Wales National Parks and Wildlife Service and the Ku-ring-gai Council. The area retains indigenous vegetation including banksias, grevilleas and wildflowers in the spring, and numerous rocky outcrops including the large sandstone steps of the rocky bar known as the 'Stepping Stones' which separates the salt waters of Middle Harbour from the fresh water of Middle Harbour Creek. Walking tracks follow the creek valley between the head of Middle Harbour and the northern sections of Garigal National Park as well as connecting the Stepping Stones crossing with St Ives to the west and Davidson Trail, Frenchs Forest to the east.

== Access ==
- Founders Way Walking track leaving from Hunter Ave, St Ives leads onto the Pipeline Track (a 4WD maintenance trail) and the Bungaroo Track (a narrow walking trail), both of which descend to Middle Harbour Creek. Both tracks are in good condition and are popular walks for local residents.
- Middle Harbour Track leads from the Cascades in Garigal National Park to the Governor Phillip Walk. The track follows along the eastern side of Middle Harbour towards Forestville, New South Wales.
