= Bantry Bay Explosives Depot =

- Location within New South Wales Location within Australia
- 33°46′37″S 151°13′49″E
- Location: Killarney Heights, Northern Beaches Council, New South Wales, Australia

History
- Built: 1915–

Site notes
- Owner: Office of Environment and Heritage

New South Wales Heritage Register
- Official name: Bantry Bay Explosives Depot
- Type: State heritage (complex / group)
- Designated: 2 April 1999
- Reference no.: 977
- Type: Ordnance Store
- Category: Defence

The Bantry Bay Explosives Depot is a heritage-listed former explosives depot at Killarney Heights, New South Wales, a suburb of Sydney, Australia. It was built in 1915. The property is owned by the Office of Environment and Heritage, an agency of the Government of New South Wales. It was added to the New South Wales State Heritage Register on 2 April 1999.

== History ==
The Bantry Bay Explosives Magazine Complex was established in 1908 following advice from the "Report of the Committee of Inquiry" that explosives stored in Powder Magazines and Hulks in Middle Harbour should be moved to a location less susceptible to explosions. A total of 701 acres and 2 roads were allocated to for the storage facility. Work commenced in 1910 and in 1915 the new magazines at Bantry Bay were declared "Public Magazines". Figure illustrates the location of the Magazine Complex. The Bantry Bay Complex was extremely well designed, with tram tracks linking the recessed nine magazines to the Major Receiving Magazine and jetties on the waterfront. During its time of operation, the complex was a highly specialised and industrious port facility, utilising a variety of boats and specialist hand trolleys to transport goods between the boats and the magazines. The event of new technologies and resident pressure eventuated the official announcement of the closure of the Bantry Bay facility in June 1972. The Complex was closed in May 1974 and incorporated into the Davidson Park State Recreation Area.

In 1992 Davison State Recreation Area was subsequently incorporated into Garigal National Park. Since operations have ceased at Bantry Bay, the care and maintenance of the buildings has been a major problem. Shortly after being included in Garigal National Park, a major stabilisation program was undertaken on the western seawall, but there were insufficient funds to complete the work. Most of the buildings are in relatively sound condition, but have been subject to vandalism, and most of the fittings have been removed.

== Description ==
The Bantry Bay Explosives Depot is a specialised industrial integrated complex designed for safe handling and cool storage of explosives. The main complex has magazines of different size and light variation in design detail but all with landing platform to tramway in excavated rock, double brick walls, parquet flooring (except fourteen and sixteen) and roofs to lift off under impact of explosion and with in built cooling systems watered from concrete dam. Some wharves are covered to minimise heat exposure. The shed has a door to the Harbour and a pontoon.

== Heritage listing ==
The Bantry Bay Explosives Depot is a unique example of integrated handling and storage facilities for explosive materials.

Bantry Bay Explosives Depot was listed on the New South Wales State Heritage Register on 2 April 1999.
