= Fullers Bridge =

Road bridge in suburban Sydney, New South Wales, Australia

Fullers Bridge (Fullers Creek Bridge)
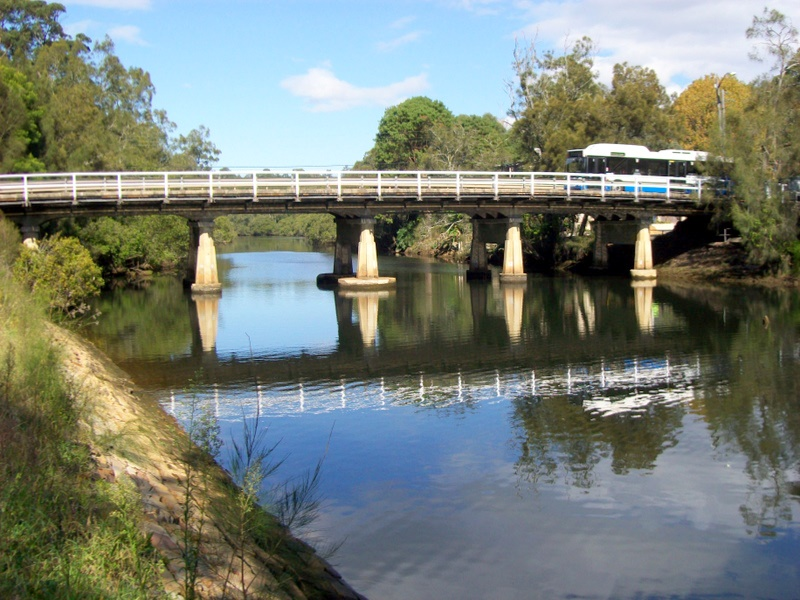
- The Fullers Bridge, located in Chatswood West, Sydney
- Coordinates: 33°47′34″S 151°09′25″E
- Carries: Delhi Road: Motor vehicles; Pedestrians; Bicycles
- Crosses: Lane Cove River
- Locale: Chatswood West, Sydney, New South Wales, Australia
- Named for: The Fuller family, early settlers in the area
- Owner: Transport for NSW
- Heritage status: NSW State Heritage Register; Transport for NSW heritage and conservation register
- Preceded by: De Burghs Bridge
- Followed by: Epping Road bridge / M2 Hills Motorway

Characteristics
- Design: Beam bridge
- Material: Concrete
- No. of spans: 6

History
- Construction end: 1918

Location
- Interactive map of Fullers Bridge (Fullers Creek Bridge)

Fullers Bridge, officially called the Fullers Creek Bridge, is a road bridge that carries Delhi Road to Millwood Avenue across the Lane Cove River, in Chatswood West, Sydney, New South Wales, Australia. The concrete beam bridge is located 9 kilometres (5.6 mi) northwest of the Sydney central business district and connects Chatswood to North Ryde as part of the A38.

The main entrance to Lane Cove National Park is located adjacent to the western end of Fullers Bridge.

== Description ==
Completed in 1918, Fullers Bridge is a six-span structure, with four longitudinal deck beams on an over-vertical curve or camber. The beams have soffits which are parallel with the deck over most of their length, but curve down to the piers. The piers consist of two columns each supported by timber piles with pilecaps. The pier columns have a square core cross section with large chamfers, giving an octagonal appearance, with four tapered thickenings or buttresses. The deep headstock connecting the columns supports the four deck beams. The deck is continuous from one abutment to the other. On the upstream side of the deck a timber walkway has been installed, supported by steel cantilever beams connected under the edge of the deck. The original pipe handrails have been replaced by guardrailing. The bridge also supports utility pipes on its downstream side.

== History ==
Fullers Bridge is named after the Fuller family which operated a farm on the small area of agriculturally usable land which existed on the river banks at that location, in the late 19th century.

Up until the early 1980s a kiosk and general store existed on the northern side of the bridge, and was accessible from both sides of the river by the northern pedestrian footbridge.

Fullers Bridge played a part in a famous Australian mystery, with the bodies of Dr Gilbert Bogle and Mrs Margaret Chandler discovered on the banks of the Lane Cove River on 1 January 1963, 70 metres (230 ft) south of the bridge.

== Heritage significance ==
Fullers Bridge has local historic significance as a long anticipated element of public infrastructure shaping the history of the Willoughby and Lane Cove areas by providing permanent access across the Lane Cove River when road routes linking these areas were few and far between. As well as opening the area to the east and north to residential development, the bridge has made possible tourist access to the popular National Park adjacent. As an early example of a sizeable reinforced concrete bridge, identified as the first continuous reinforced concrete girder bridge in New South Wales, the bridge has significance as part of the history of the development of concrete bridge design and construction, a technology that gained an important place in the State's road infrastructure through the mid twentieth century. The bridge has rarity value in NSW as a good, intact example of a continuous beam reinforced concrete bridge constructed prior to 1925.

— Statement of significance, Heritage and conservation register, Roads & Maritime Services, 17 April 2009.

== See also ==
- List of bridges in Sydney
