= Manly Hospital =

Defunct hospital in Sydney, Australia

- Northern Sydney Local Health District

Geography
- Location: Sydney, New South Wales, Australia
- Coordinates: 33.8062°S 151.2944°E

Organisation
- Care system: Medicare
- Type: District General

Services
- Emergency department: No

History
- Opened: 1896
- Closed: 2018

Links
- Website: Official Website
- Lists: Hospitals in Australia

Manly Hospital provided medical services to the Northern Beaches area of Sydney, Australia before the transfer of services to Northern Beaches Hospital. The Northern Sydney Local Health District managed Manly Hospital.

== History ==
Manly Hospital was established in 1896 on the corner of Raglan Street and Quinton Road, as a result of enthusiastic fundraising by William Horner Fletcher and a government subsidy. Originally known as the Manly Cottage Hospital, from 1929 it was referred to as the Manly District Hospital.

In May 2013 the State government announced the Northern Beaches Hospital would be built at Frenchs Forest. Upon its completion in 2018 it became the primary hospital for the Northern Beaches, with Manly Hospital closing on 30 October 2018.

== See also ==
- List of hospitals in Australia
