= Frenchs Creek =

Stream in North Carolina, USA

Frenchs Creek Tributary to New River
- Location of Frenchs Creek mouth Frenchs Creek (the United States)

Location
- Country: United States
- State: North Carolina
- County: Onslow

Physical characteristics
- Source: Gillets Creek divide
  - location: Camp LeJeune
  - coordinates: 34°36′31″N 077°17′50″W
  - elevation: 35 ft (11 m)
- Mouth: New River
  - location: Camp LeJeune
  - coordinates: 34°38′21″N 077°20′22″W
  - elevation: 0 ft (0 m)
- Length: 4.79 mi (7.71 km)
- Basin size: 12.29 square miles (31.8 km^{2})
- Discharge
  - location: New River
  - average: 18.16 cu ft/s (0.514 m^{3}/s) at mouth with New River

Basin features
- Progression: Frenchs → New → Atlantic Ocean
- River system: White Oak River
- Tributaries
  - left: unnamed tributaries
  - right: Jumping Run
- Bridges: Marines Road

Frenchs Creek is a stream in Onslow County, North Carolina, in the United States.

The name Frenchs Creek most likely honors Alexander Nicola, a French pioneer who settled there.

== Variant names ==
According to the Geographic Names Information System, it has also been known historically as:

- Farnell Bay
- French Creek
- Frenches Creek
- Frenchmans Creek

== Course ==
Frenchs Creek rises within Camp LeJeune in Onslow County and then flows northwest to join the New River also within Camp LeJeune.

== Watershed ==
Frenchs Creek drains 12.29 square miles (31.8 km^{2}) of area, receives about 55.6 in/year of precipitation, and has a wetness index of 547.71 and is about 11% forested.

== See also ==
- List of rivers of North Carolina
