= Northern Beaches Hospital =

Hospital in Sydney

- Northern Sydney Local Health District
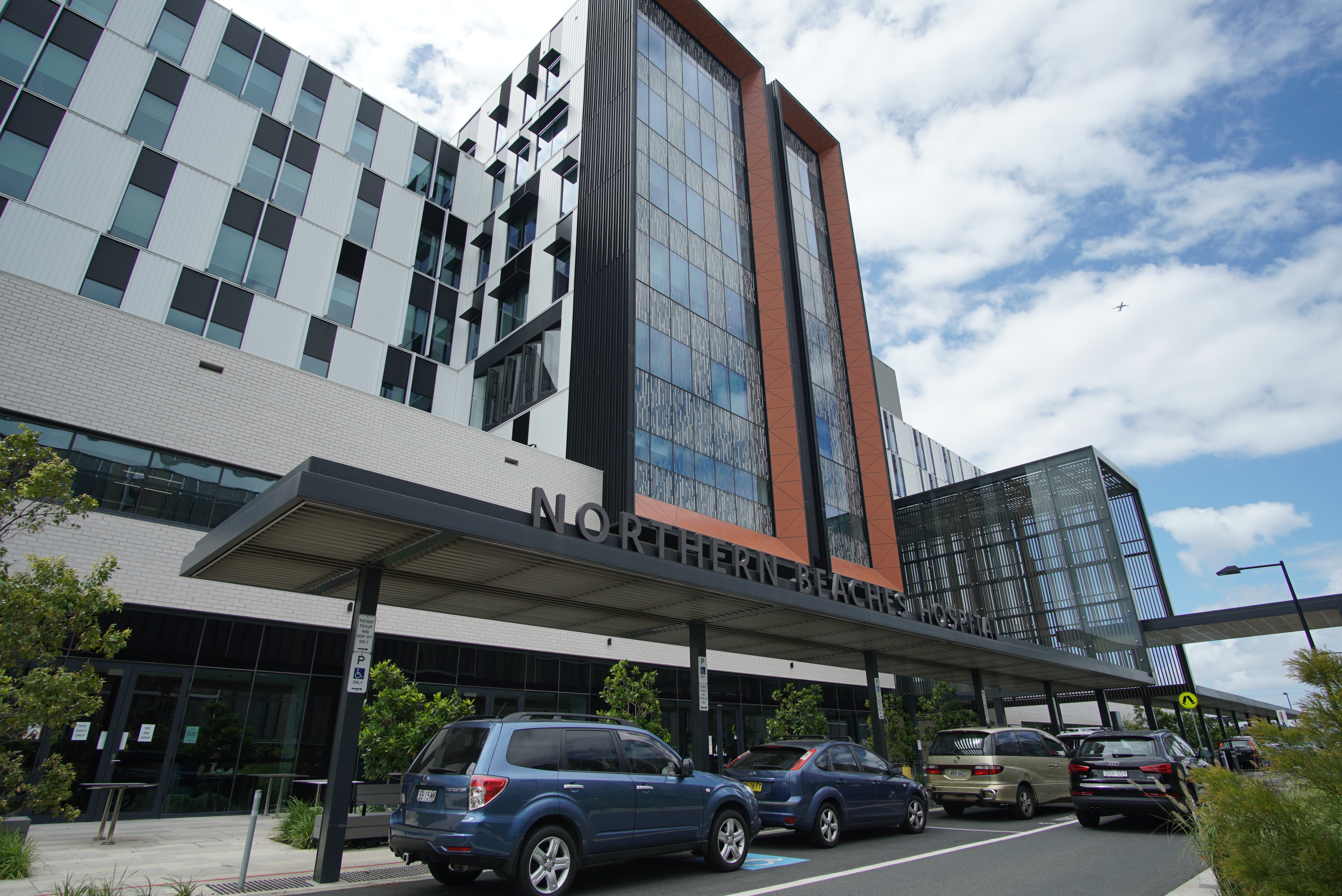
- Main Entrance of Northern Beaches Hospital

Geography
- Location: Frenchs Forest, Sydney, New South Wales, Australia
- Coordinates: 33.750751°S 151.232880°E

Organisation
- Care system: Medicare; Private; Public
- Type: District General
- Network: NSW Health

Services
- Emergency department: Yes
- Beds: 488

Helipads
- Helipad: (ICAO: YXNL)
Number	Length		Surface
Number	ft	m	Surface
1			concrete

History
- Founded: 30 October 2018

Links
- Website: www.nslhd.health.nsw.gov.au/northernbeaches/Pages/default.aspx

The Northern Beaches Hospital is a district general hospital in Frenchs Forest, located in the Northern Beaches region of Sydney, New South Wales, Australia.

Originally operated under a public–private partnership hospital when opened, the hospital was integrated with in the public NSW Health system effective 29th of April 2026.

== History ==
In May 2013, the state government announced the Northern Beaches Hospital would be built in Frenchs Forest. Upon its completion it became the primary Hospital for the Northern Beaches, with Manly Hospital to close and Mona Vale Hospital to be downgraded. It was previously operated by Healthscope. In December 2014, Leighton Contractors were selected to build the hospital. The hospital opened on 30 October 2018.

As part of the project, a series of road enhancements were made to the adjoining Forest Way, Wakehurst Parkway and Warringah Road by a joint venture between Ferrovial and York Civil. Upgrades were completed in mid-2020.

The hospital is both a private and public hospital, and 40% of beds were reserved for private patients.

Northern Beaches Hospital played an integral role in the COVID-19 response in NSW by operating a seven-day per week COVID-19 testing clinic, busy emergency department, and admitted unwell patients into the intensive care unit. In early 2022, over 60 ward beds were dedicated to COVID-19 patients. The hospital was one of the first in Sydney to allow visitors to once again visit patients.

In September 2024, a two-year-old boy died at the hospital after he "was left in an emergency department chair for 2½ hours despite showing clear signs of a life-threatening condition."

In February 2025, after the parents of the boy met New South Wales premier Chris Minns, it was reported that "the government was also reviewing its options regarding the contract with Healthscope to run Northern Beaches Hospital until 2038 under a controversial public–private partnership." It was also reported that Minns was "open to legislation ruling out any future private-public hospital arrangements in New South Wales."

In March 2025, Chris Minns announced that the government would not rule out buying back Northern Beaches Hospital from its private owners, "after announcing a ban on any future public-private partnerships at acute hospitals" as a consequence of the death of the two-year-old boy in 2024.

In April 2025, an audit conducted by the NSW Government found numerous failings at the hospital including that the hospital was not effectively delivering outcomes and that safety and quality issues remained.

In September 2025, the state government announced that the hospital would be brought under the public NSW Health system following perceived failures.

In April 2026, the transition to the NSW Health system was completed, the government also guaranteed that private services would remain at the hospital until June 2027.
