= Chislehurst, Chatswood =

Former house and school in New South Wales, Australia

Chislehurst
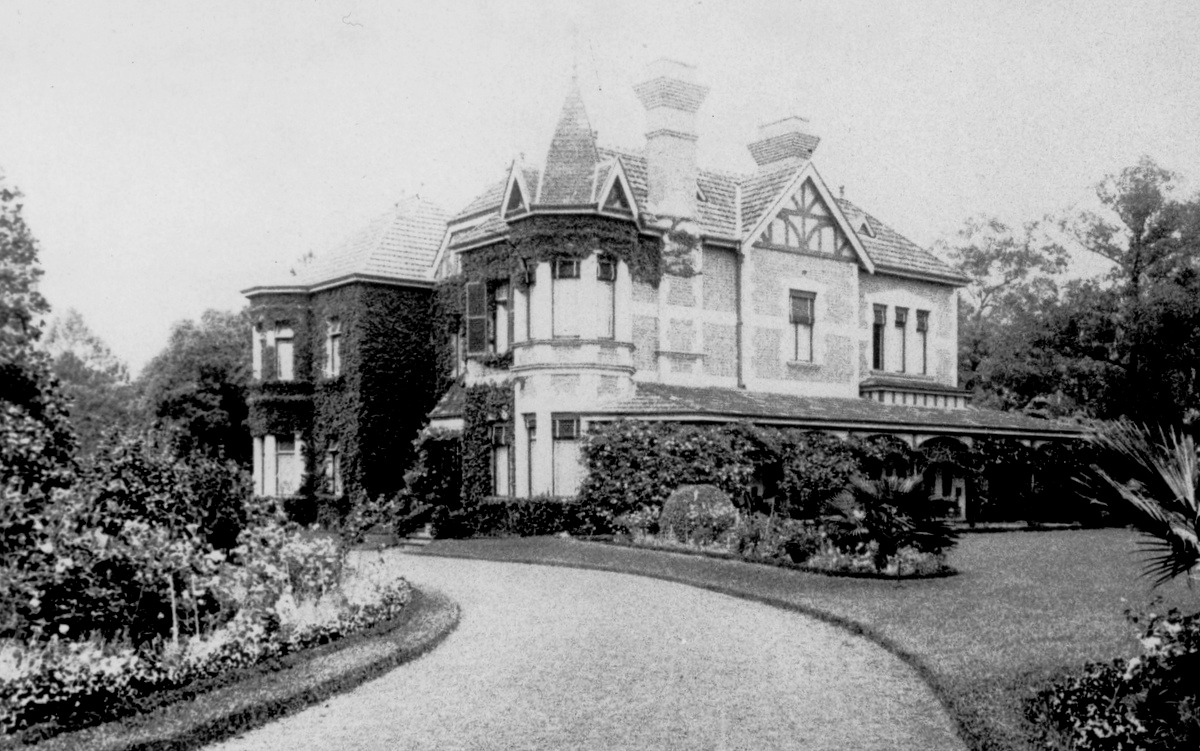
- Chislehurst, in 1913

- Location within Sydney
- Former names: Maroomba

General information
- Status: Demolished
- Type: House (1892–1954); School (since 1959)
- Location: 24 Centennial Ave, Chatswood West, Sydney, New South Wales, Australia
- Coordinates: 33°47′55″S 151°10′29″E
- Completed: 1892; 134 years ago

Chislehurst was a former house and former school building located in Chatswood West, Sydney, New South Wales, Australia. Completed in 1892 by the merchant and pastoralist John de Villiers Lamb, the former house was originally known as Maroomba.

== History ==
In 1900, the house was bought from Lamb by a K. Weidlmann. Weidlmann sold the house in 1906 to Edward Carr Hordern, a member of the Hordern family.. It was renamed Chiselhurst after the birthplace of Carr Hordern's wife, Lillie. Hordern expanded the house significantly and lived there until his death in 1940. His widow and sister continued to live there until the house was vacated in 1954.

The property was then acquired by the NSW Department of Education as a site for Chatswood High School, which opened in 1959.
