= Chatswood West =

- Suburb
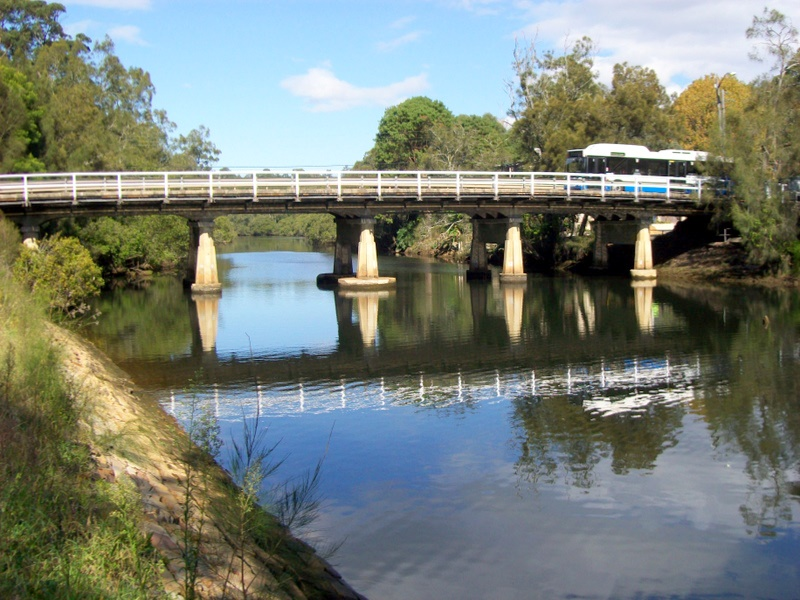
- Fullers Bridge, Chatswood West

- Interactive map of Chatswood West
- Country: Australia
- State: New South Wales
- City: Sydney
- LGA: City of Willoughby, City of Ryde
- Location: 10 km (6.2 mi) north-west of Sydney CBD
- Established: 20 January 2006

Government
  - State electorates: Lane Cove; Willoughby
  - Federal divisions: Bennelong; Bradfield

Area
  - Total: 2.8 km^{2} (1.1 sq mi)

Population
  - Total: 1,521 (2021 census)
  - Density: 543/km^{2} (1,407/sq mi)
- Postcode: 2067
Suburbs around Chatswood West
Macquarie Park	Lindfield	Roseville
North Ryde	Chatswood West	Chatswood
Lane Cove West	Lane Cove	Artarmon

Chatswood West is a suburb on the Lower North Shore of Sydney, in the state of New South Wales, Australia. Chatswood West is located 11 kilometres north-west of the Sydney central business district, in the local government areas of the City of Willoughby and City of Ryde. Chatswood is a separate suburb to the east. The locality of Chatswood located west of the Pacific Highway is informally known as West Chatswood, and should not be confused with the separate suburb of Chatswood West, nor should it be confused with the West Chatswood Post Office on Railway Street in the suburb of Chatswood. Chatswood West shares the same postcode as Chatswood which is 2067.

Chatswood West is located between the bigger suburbs of Chatswood and North Ryde. It straddles the Lane Cove River, occupying the valley flats and ridges leading down to the river.

== History ==
Chatswood is believed to be named after the pet name "Chat" of the second wife of Richard Harnett (a pioneer of the district) and the original "wooded" nature of the area.

Chatswood West played a part in a famous Australian mystery, with the bodies of Dr Gilbert Bogle and Mrs Margaret Chandler being discovered on the banks of the Lane Cove River, 70 metres south of Fullers Bridge, on 1 January 1963.

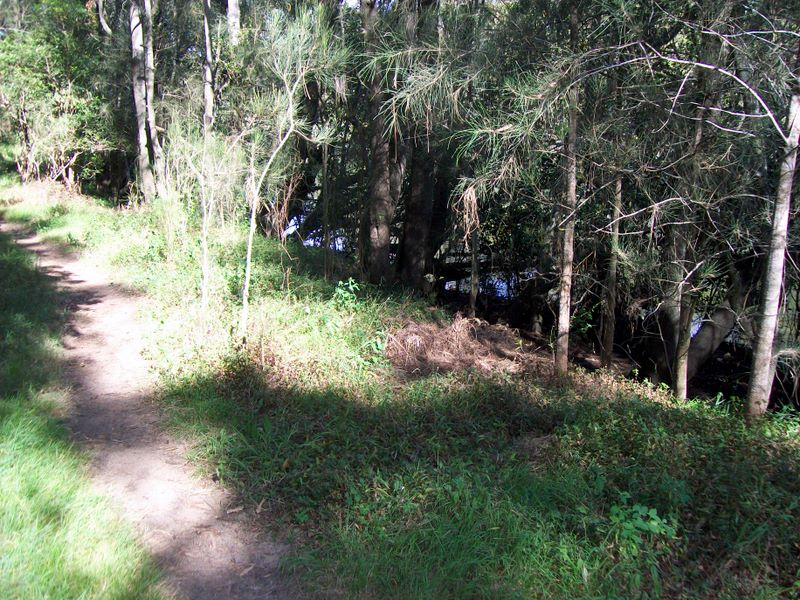
Site of the Dr Gilbert Bogle and Mrs Margaret Chandler mystery, Fullers Bridge, Chatswood West

Chatswood West split off from Chatswood to become a separate suburb on 20 January 2006. Chislehurst was a large historic house on Centennial Avenue.

== Commercial ==
The majority of land in Chatswood West is designated as single home low density residential with the only commercial shops within Chatswood being a small convenience store on Millawood Avenue.

In the close proximity of Chatswood West there are a few notable large shopping centres. These being Chatswood Westfield, Macquarie Shopping Centre, and Lachlans Line.

== Housing ==
The residential buildings are overwhelmingly detached houses. In 2026, the median price for homes in Chatswood West is $2,470,000, and the median weekly rent for a house is $1,200. The price of housing is aligned with the typical expected land and building value of the suburbs surrounding Chatswood West.

There are two main areas that encompass the bulk of residential dwellings in the suburb, the Eastern Side of the Lane Cove River and the Western Side. The majority of the residents live on the eastern side, while a few hundred live on the western side of the river.

== Education ==
Chatswood West is in close proximity to a large number schooling opportunities from Kindergarten to High School.

=== Primary School Education ===
There are many different school situated in and around Chatswood West. Including public schools, Catholic Schools, and Alternative Learning. The major schools include Mowbray Public School the Lindfield Learning Village, and Our Lady of Dolours Primary School.

=== High School Education ===
There are four notable schools close to Chatswood West that provide high school education. These being, Chatswood High School, St Pius X Collage, Mercy Catholic Collage, and Willoughby Girls High School.

== Public Transport ==
There are many ways to travel within, to and from Chatswood West. The Suburb is serviced by two bus routes and is in close proximity to a metro line and two train lines.

Chatswood West is serviced by the 256 (Chatswood Station (Stand G) (Loop Service), the 516 (Chatswood Station (Stand G) to Ryde (Devlin Street)), and the special events A1 bus to Sydney Olympic Park. The 516 is serviced half hourly in both directions while the 256 runs every around 45 minutes and only in peak hour.

There are two heavy rail stations in close proximity to Chatswood, these being North Ryde Station and Chatswood Station (M1 Metro Line, T1 Western Line, and T9 Northern Line). Buses easily connect to these stations. Chatswood and North Ryde provide rail services all across Sydney, including the Sydney CBD, Inner West, South, West, and North Shore of Sydney.

== Population ==
=== Demographics ===
According to the 2021 census, there were 1,521 residents in Chatswood West. 55.2% of people were born in Australia. The next most common country of birth was China at 11.2%. 60.9% of people only spoke English at home. Other languages spoken at home included Mandarin at 13.3%. The most common responses for religion in Chatswood West were No Religion 46.1%, Catholic 20.6% and Anglican 10.8%.

=== Notable residents ===
- Kenneth Slessor - poet, lived on the west side of the Pacific Highway
- Roger Woodward - pianist, lived on Peckham Street
- Errol Flynn - movie star, lived on McLean Avenue
- Tony Abbott - former prime minister of Australia, lived on West Parade

== Parks ==
There are a number of parks and forest reserves such as Ferndale Park. There are walking tracks and a golf course. There are two entrances to Lane Cove National Park from Chatswood West, one on Lady Game Drive, and one on Delhi Road, next to Fullers Bridge.

Noteworthy indigenous flora includes the blackbutt, tree heath, celery wood, coachwood, native crabapple and hard corkwood. Ferns include jungle brake, fishbone water fern, filmy fern and necklace fern.

Fauna includes powerful owl, barking owl, Australian king parrot, brush turkey, eastern whipbird, satin bowerbird, eastern water dragon, emerald spotted frog, enamelled spider, red triangle slug, blue planarian, long-nosed bandicoot and marsupial mouse.

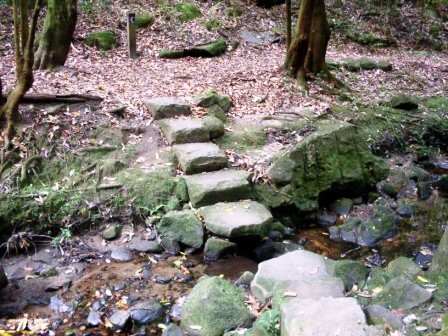
Crossing of Swaines Creek, Chatswood West

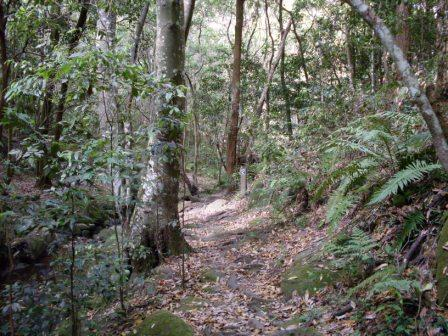
Coachwood - Ferndale Park

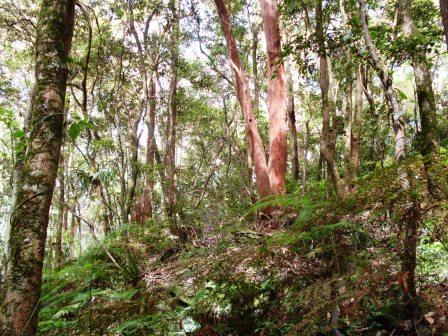
Forest scene - Ferndale Park

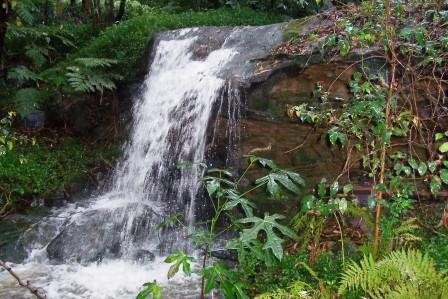
Tributary of Swaines Creek

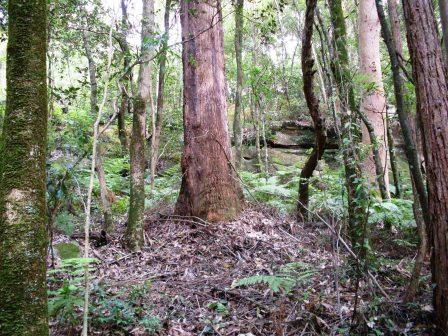
Large blackbutt - Ferndale Park

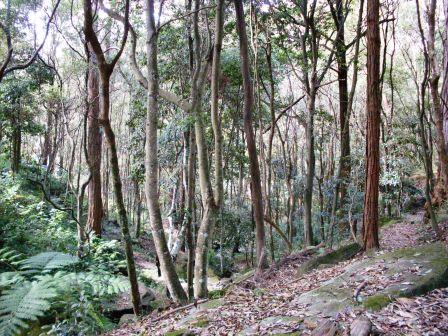
Coachwood rainforest - Ferndale Park

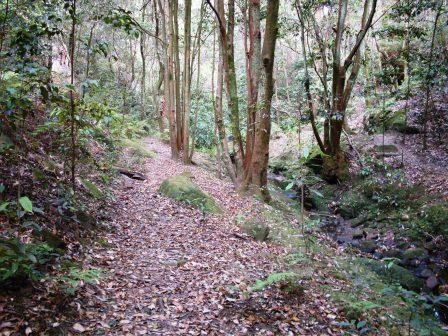
Lilli pilli rainforest - Ferndale Park

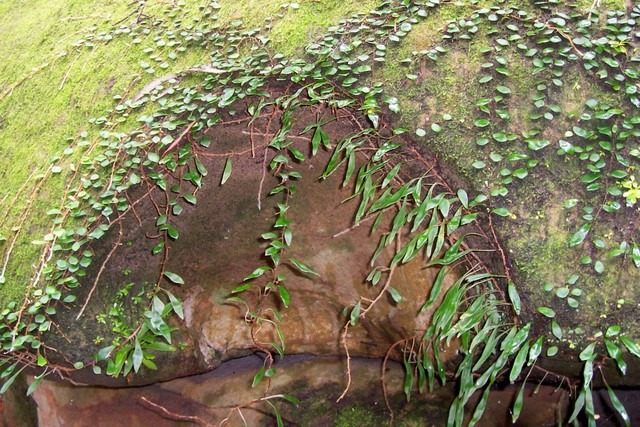
Hawkesbury sandstone and rock felt fern (Pyrrosia rupestris)
