= Necklace fern =

Necklace fern is a common name for several plants and may refer to:

- Asplenium flabellifolium, native to Australia and New Zealand
- Lindsaea
