= New River (eastern North Carolina) =

River in Onslow County

Coordinates: 34.530°N 77.339°W

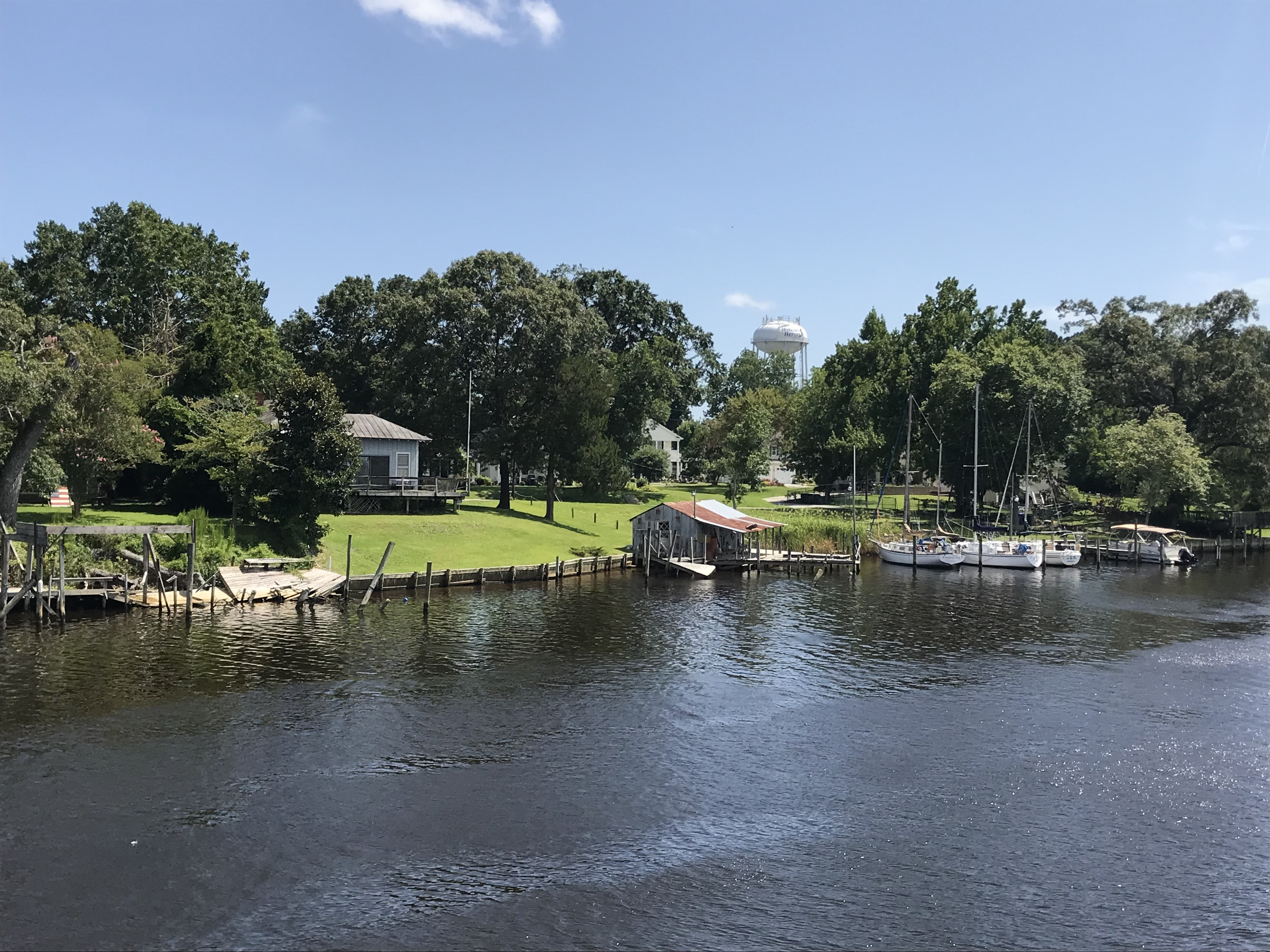
New River waterfront in Jacksonville, North Carolina

The New River is a 50-mile (80-km) long river in southeastern North Carolina in the United States. It empties into the Atlantic Ocean. The river has been plagued in more recent years by pollution by solid waste. It rises in northwestern Onslow County and flows east-southeast past Jacksonville, where it widens into a tidal estuary approximately two miles (3.2 km) wide. As an estuary it meanders through Marine Corps Base Camp Lejeune and enters the Atlantic in Onslow Bay, via the New River Inlet between two barrier islands. The Atlantic Intracoastal Waterway crosses the entrance of the river between the coast and the barrier island.

The river is periodically dredged for fishing operations.

== History ==
=== Environmental decline ===
In 1940, the city government of Jacksonville, North Carolina built a sewage treatment plant to serve its 873 residents. The plant directly discharged its treated water into the New River. Jacksonville rapidly expanded during World War II and thereafter due to the growth of Marine Corps Base Camp Lejeune, putting strain on the municipal wastewater infrastructure. The treatment plant filtered out pathogens but was unable to remove ammonias, phosphates, and nitrates from the water. The additional nutrients dumped into the river led to algal blooms, reduced oxygen levels, and fish kills. Declining water quality led the New River to be closed to the public in the early 1980s. In 1995, a hog lagoon leaked 25 million gallons of waste into the river.

=== Restoration efforts ===
Following the 1995 hog lagoon spill, local officials decided to try to rehabilitate the New River. Jacksonville's government replaced its sewage plant and consulted with scientists from North Carolina State University on ways to remediate the river's water quality. As a result, the city launched an oyster reef restoration project with the hopes that the added oysters would filter out pollutants in the water and attract other wildlife, such as fish. After some improvements in water quality, the river was reopened for recreational activities and commercial fishing operations in 2001.

== See also ==
- List of North Carolina rivers
