= Middle Harbour =

Northern arm of Port Jackson in Sydney

- Warrin ga
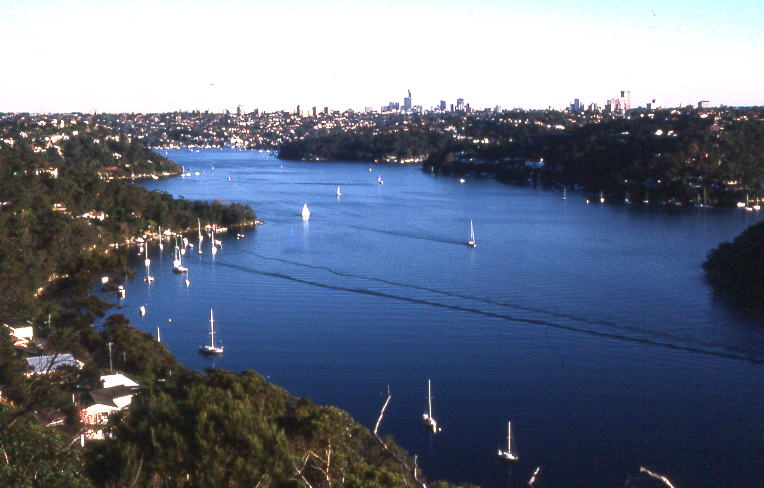
- Middle Harbour seen from behind Seaforth Oval

- Location in East Sydney
- Location: Greater Metropolitan Sydney, New South Wales
- Coordinates: 33°48′16″S 151°14′58″E
- Type: Semi-mature tide dominated, drowned valley estuary
- Part of: Sydney Harbour
- Primary inflows: Middle Harbour Creek
- Primary outflows: Port Jackson
- Catchment area: 100 km^{2} (39 sq mi)
- Basin countries: Australia
- Max. length: 10 km (6.2 mi)

Middle Harbour (or Warrin ga), a semi-mature tide dominated drowned valley estuary, is the northern arm of Port Jackson, an inlet of the Tasman Sea located north of Sydney central business district on the coast of New South Wales, Australia.

Middle Harbour has its source in the upper reaches of Garigal National Park where it forms Middle Harbour Creek and flows southeast to become Middle Harbour at Bungaroo and travels for approximately 10 kilometres (6.2 mi) before reaching its mouth at Port Jackson between Grotto Point near Clontarf and Middle Head.

The catchment area of Middle Harbour is approximately 100 square kilometres (39 sq mi).

== Geography ==
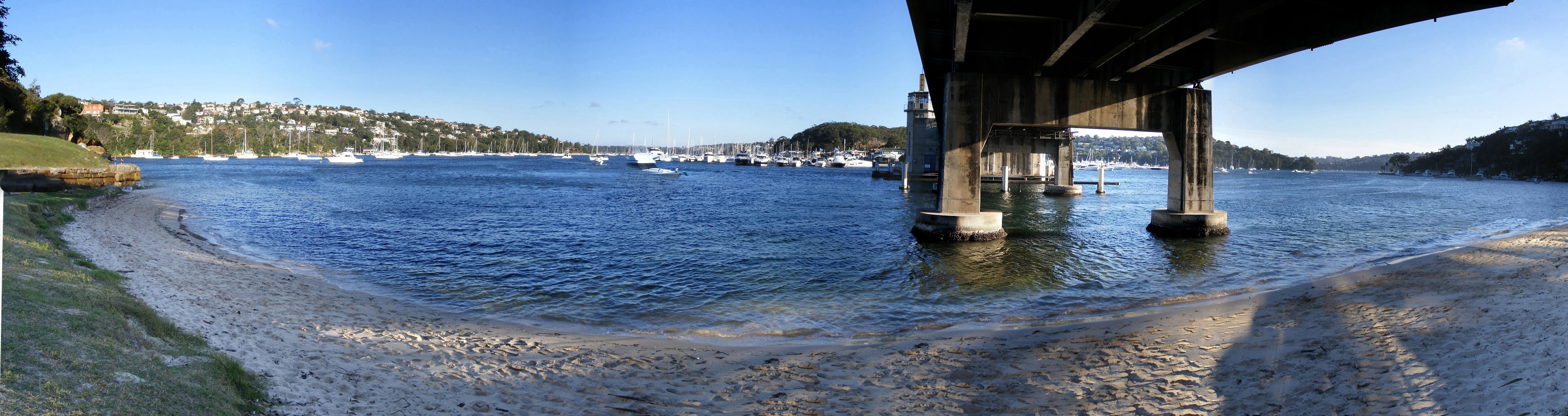
Middle Harbour, under the Spit Bridge

The shore of Middle Harbour is nearly everywhere rugged, barren and forested and for this reason Middle Harbour was almost entirely neglected during the first two centuries of European settlement in Sydney. There are only a few small patches of flat land on its shores. There are many small creeks draining the surrounding hills, but no significant rivers flow into Middle Harbour.

Within Middle Harbour are, from upstream to downstream, Shell Cove, Pearl Bay, Long Bay, Sugarloaf Bay, Bantry Bay, Fisher Bay, Sandy Bay, Sailors Bay, Powder Hulk Bay, Willoughby Bay and Quakers Hat Bay.

Middle Harbour is a significant physical barrier between Sydney's North Shore and the suburbs known as the Northern Beaches area which lie north and east of Middle Harbour.

There are only two bridges – the Spit Bridge and the Roseville Bridge – and because of this obstacle, historically the main transport between Manly and Sydney was by ferry.

Since the 1920s, most of the land on the ridge-tops around Middle Harbour has been developed for suburban housing. Much of the rugged shore of the Middle Harbour remains covered with bushland, most of it now protected by parks and reserves. Middle Harbour is a popular area for recreational boating and fishing.

== History ==
Middle Harbour is also extremely significant culturally, spiritually and recreationally to those who live near the water. The harbour is popular amongst fisherman and recreational boaters. An example of the cultural significance of Middle Harbour is highlighted through an odd custom amongst boaters who use the Tunks Park boat ramp in Cammeray. Becoming popular in the late 1980s and 1990s, boaters exiting the 4 knot zone outside of the Cammeray Marina would play "The Old Man Down The Road", a swamp rock song written by Creedence Clearwater Revival lead singer and guitarist, John Fogerty, on their cassettes. Although the origin of this custom is argued upon by locals, many believe it began with fisherman who sought a way to "burn away the sandman (drowsiness)". Others believe the term "The Old Man" may refer to an old folk name for the harbour.

== See also ==
- Middle Harbour Public School
- Bantry Bay Explosives Depot
