= North Curl Curl =

- Suburb
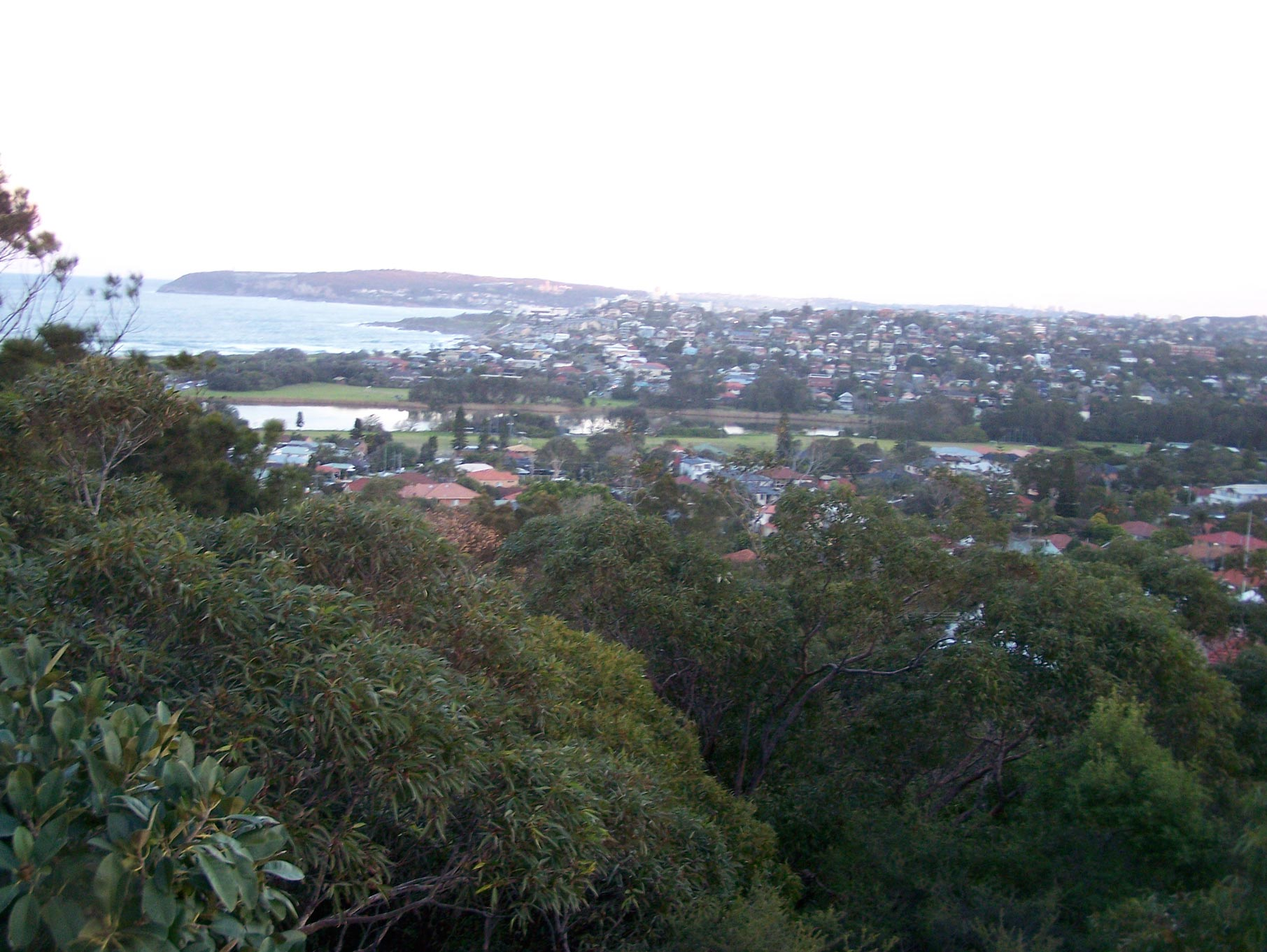
- North Curl Curl from Wingala Reserve

- Interactive map of North Curl Curl
- Country: Australia
- State: New South Wales
- City: Sydney
- LGA: Northern Beaches Council
- Location: 19 km (12 mi) north-east of Sydney CBD

Government
  - State electorate: Manly
  - Federal division: Mackellar
- Elevation: 18 m (59 ft)

Population
  - Total: 4,288 (2021 census)
- Postcode: 2099
Suburbs around North Curl Curl
Brookvale	Dee Why
Brookvale	North Curl Curl	Pacific Ocean
North Manly	Curl Curl

North Curl Curl is a suburb in northern Sydney, in the state of New South Wales, Australia. It is 19 kilometres north-east of the Sydney central business district, in the local government area of Northern Beaches Council. It is part of the Northern Beaches region.

== History ==
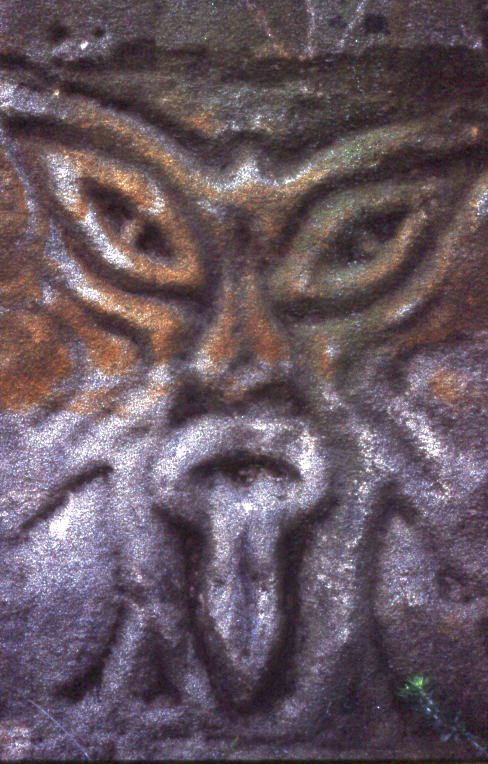
20th Century Rock carving at North Curl Curl Beach

The name 'Curl Curl' may be derived from the Aboriginal phrase curial curial, meaning river of life.

The name Curl Curl Lagoon was originally applied to Manly Lagoon, which empties into the ocean at Queenscliff, and the current Curl Curl Lagoon was named Harbord Lagoon. This was a result of the land grant of 'Harbord' originally being much larger than the suburb that later bore this name. The names were changed as a part of a renaming program in the 1980s to reflect the true location of the lagoons.

The North Curl Curl Post Office opened on 10 June 1923 and was renamed Curl Curl North in 1948.

== Population ==
In the 2021 Census, there were 4,288 people in North Curl Curl. 71.4% of people were born in Australia. The next most common country of birth was England at 8.6%. 87.8% of people only spoke English at home. The most common responses for religion were No Religion 46.0%, Catholic 23.9% and Anglican 15.9%.

== Geography ==
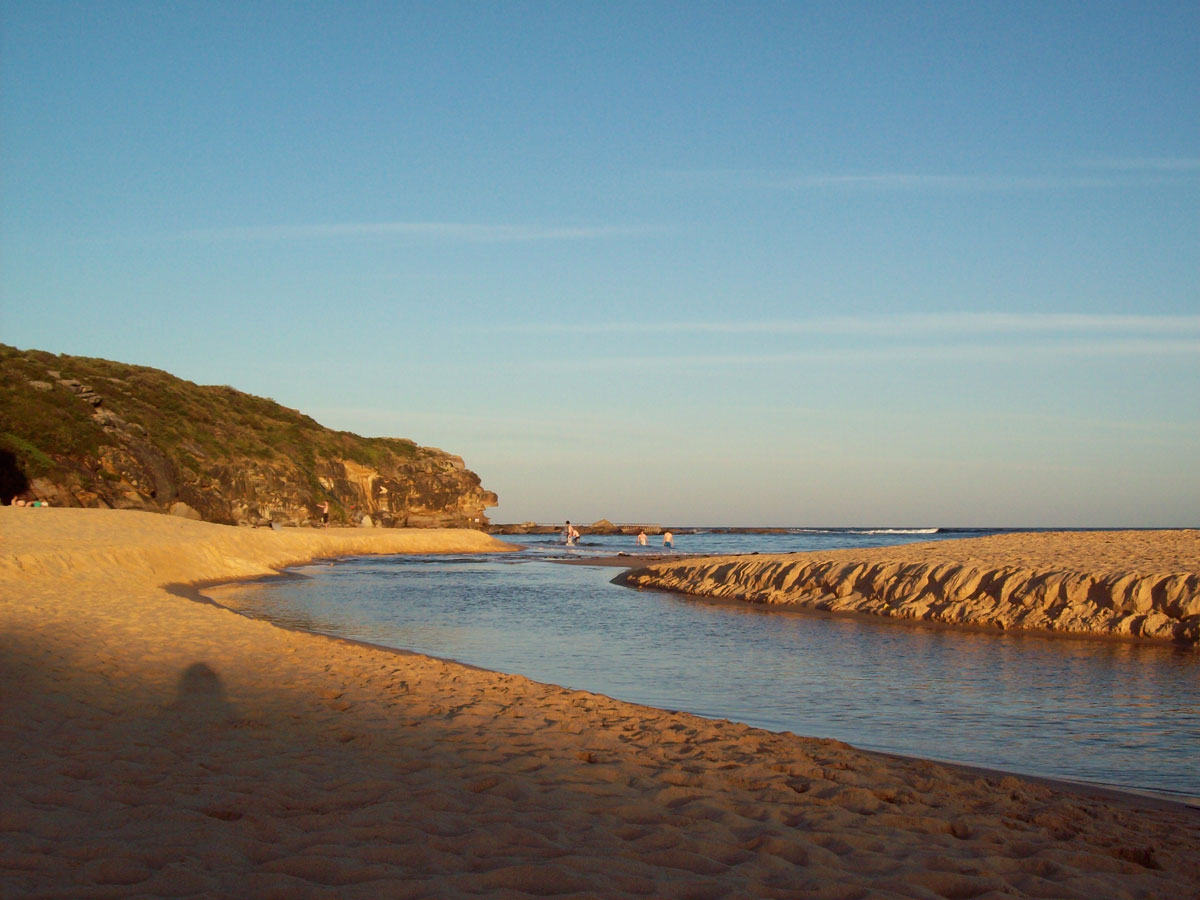
North Curl Curl Beach at sunset

Curl Curl Lagoon and Greendale Creek separate North Curl Curl from Curl Curl in the south. To the west the border with Brookvale runs along Harbord Road. Wingala is an 'urban place' as classified by the Geographical Names Board in the north and western parts of the suburb, lying on the southern slopes of a hill that overlaps into Dee Why. Headland Road marks the northern boundary, while the Tasman Sea lies to the east.

North Curl Curl Beach sits on the south-eastern border, south of Dee Why Head and lying under its cliffs, and is divided from Curl Curl Beach by the mouth of the lagoon. The suburb is generally characterised by the sometimes steep southern slopes of Wingala Hill and Dee Why Head to the north, which flatten out into the former floodplain of the lagoon towards the south.

== Sport and recreation ==
Sport and recreation facilities exist in the extensive parks and playing fields areas to the north of the Lagoon, including the community centre (formerly the Curl Curl Women's Bowling Club) Community Garden, Curl Curl Youth Club, Community Arts centre (formally Curl Curl scout hall) soccer fields (Curl Curl Football Club), baseball fields, cricket pitches, grass and hard netball courts, as well as rugby league and rugby union fields. (North Curl Curl Knights are the local rugby league side, with the colours of green and gold).

The North Curl Curl Surf Life Saving Club patrol North Curl Curl Beach.

== Transport ==
North Curl Curl is served by four bus routes, 166 Manly to Frenchs Forest, 176X Dee Why to Sydney CBD, 177 Dee Why to Warringah Mall, and 177X Dee Why to Sydney CBD.

== Schools ==
North Curl Curl has two state schools, Curl Curl North Public School and Manly Selective Campus of the Northern Beaches Secondary College (formerly Manly Boys High School).

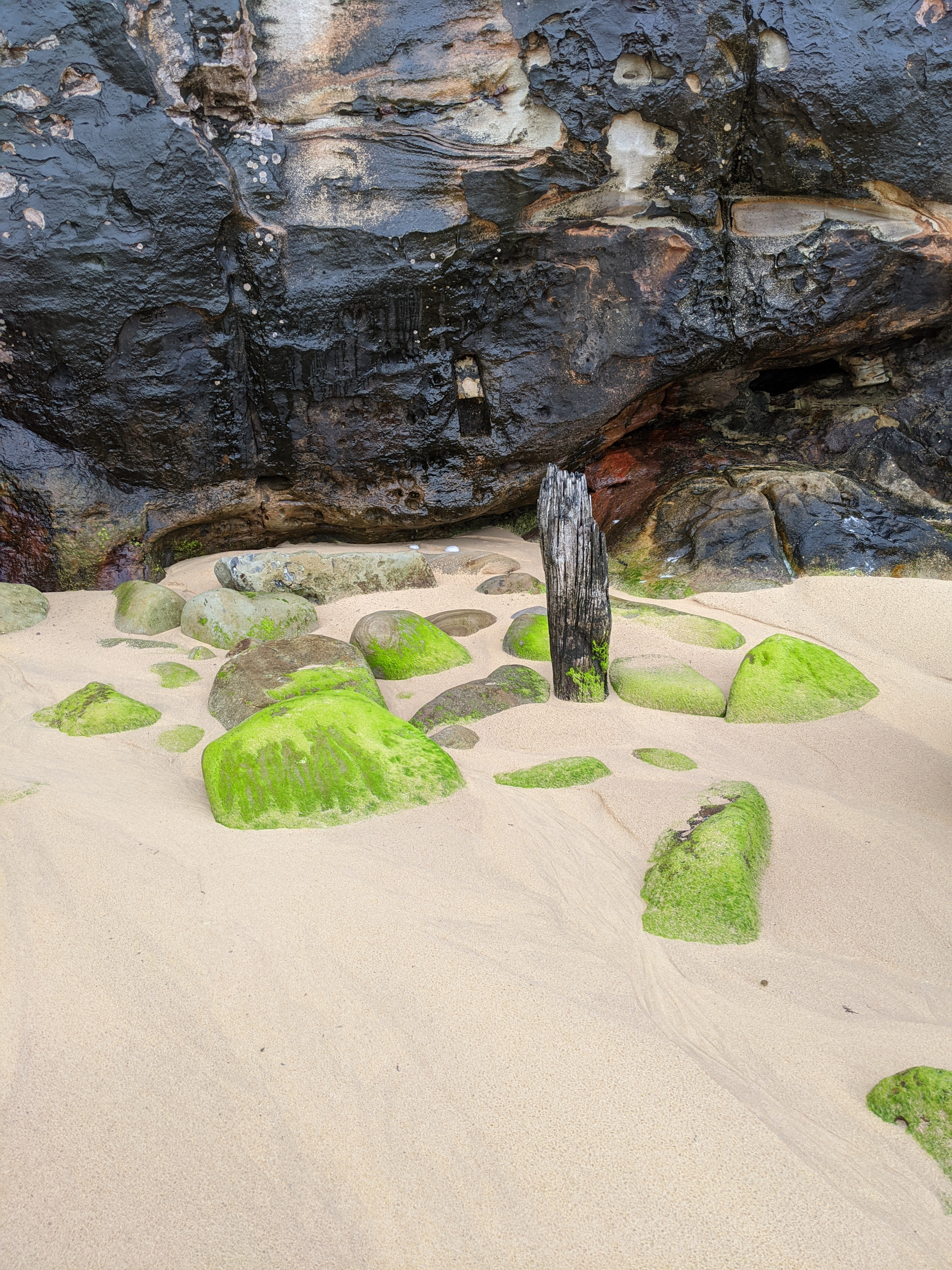
North Curl Curl Beach 2021
