= The Forest High School (New South Wales) =

- Allambie heights, New South Wales; Australia

Information
- Type: Public, secondary, co-educational, day school
- Motto: Latin: Spectemur Agendo (Let Us Be Judged By Our Actions)
- Established: January 1961
- Principal: Nathan Lawler
- Enrolment: ~ 860 (7–12)
- Campus: 135 Frenchs Forest Road
- Colours: Green, gold and red
- Feeder schools: Allambie Heights Public School Frenchs Forest Public School
- Website: theforest-h.schools.nsw.gov.au

The Forest High School, (abbreviation TFHS) is a government day school previously located in Frenchs Forest, New South Wales, Australia. It has been relocated to a site in nearby Allambie Heights in 2026. It is a co-educational secondary school operated by the New South Wales Department of Education with students ranging from grades 7 to 12. The school was established in 1961 as a secondary school for the Northern Beaches area.

Its catchment zone encompasses the suburbs of Frenchs Forest, Oxford Falls, Beacon Hill, Allambie Heights, and Seaforth.

== History ==
The formation of The Forest High School was the result of a campaign by a representative body known as The Forest High School Promotion Committee formed on 1 November 1958. The committee members were anxious to have established a co-educational high school that would cater for the educational needs of the suburbs of Frenchs Forest, Forestville, Beacon Hill and Terrey Hills and Narraweena.

On 31 January 1961, Stage One of construction was completed and The Forest High School opened with an initial enrolment of 318 students and a staff of 14 teachers under the principalship of Edward George Bell, who had been headmaster of Fairfield Boys' High School. The Latin school motto Spectemur Agendo - let us be judged by our actions - was chosen by the pioneer students and staff, while the school crest was designed by the art teacher. Originally called "French's Forest High School", on 2 August 1961 the Minister for Education, Ernest Wetherell announced the name had changed to "The Forest High School".

By 1963, Stage Three of the building program was completed with the three major buildings and enrolments had increased to 963 students. 1963 also saw the completion of the Assembly Hall in time for the second annual Speech Night on 9 April. The School magazine, "Yarrabee", was first issued in the same year.

By 1964 it was considered that the school had reached the level necessary for an official opening. This occurred on Saturday 24 October 1964, attended by the Director-General of Education, Harold Wyndham, the state Member for Wakehurst, Dick Healey, and the Minister for Education, Ernest Wetherell, and was officially opened by the Governor of New South Wales, Lieutenant-General Sir Eric Woodward.

The 1960s witnessed the beginnings of the musical program with the formation of the school orchestra, band and choir. The Forest high won the 1963 trophies for Inter-Zone junior athletics and swimming. In 1969 D block and the gymnasium were opened to accommodate the growing number of students. The final stage of building was completed in 1976 with the opening of the Library.

=== School Relocation ===
In late 2016, it was revealed that the site of The Forest High School was being considered for rezoning by the Department of Planning and Environment, which would see the school replaced by a new high-density Frenchs Forest town centre next to the Northern Beaches Hospital and the school moved to a new site in the suburb at or near the Warringah Aquatic Centre on the other side of Warringah Road. The Forest High School has been relocated to 187 Allambie Road, Allambie Heights, taking over a portion of the Frenchs Forest Cerebral Palsy Alliance Centre.

== Principals ==
Years	Principal
1961–1965	Edward George Bell BSc Dip.Ed.
1966–1977	F. W. Bailey B.Ec.
1977–1983	L. R. Woods BSc Dip.Ed.
1984–1985	J. Hensley B.A. Dip.Ed.
1986–1992	M. Armstrong B.A. Dip.Ed.
1992–2002	Patrick Kidd B.A. Dip.Ed
2002–2008	Peter Gillam MEd B.A. B.Ec. Grad.Dip.Ed.
2009–2021	Rosemary McDowall B.A. BEd Dip.Ed.
2022–present	Nathan Lawler B.A. BEd

== Notable alumni ==
- Garry Gary Beers – Musician, best known as a member of INXS.
- Peter Debnam – NSW Liberal Party politician, Leader of Opposition 2005–2007
- Tim Farriss – Musician, best known as a member of INXS.
- James Kerley – TV and radio presenter
- Bill Leak – editorial cartoonist for The Australian.
- Ian Martin – Rugby League player, 1972, 1973, 1976, 1978 premiership player, played for Manly Warringah Sea Eagles.
- Matthew Myers – Judge of the Federal Circuit Court of Australia and adjunct professor at the Faculty of Law, University of New South Wales.
- Nadje Noordhuis – Jazz Trumpeter & Composer
- Kirk Pengilly – Musician, best known as a member of INXS.
- Jim McKay – former Australian Wallabies Rugby Union team assistant coach and Queensland assistant coach – premiers 2011, 2021. Coach Brisbane City.
- Anna Wood – schoolgirl who died after taking ecstasy.

== See also ==
- List of Government schools in New South Wales
