= Manly Dam =

Dam in New South Wales, Australia

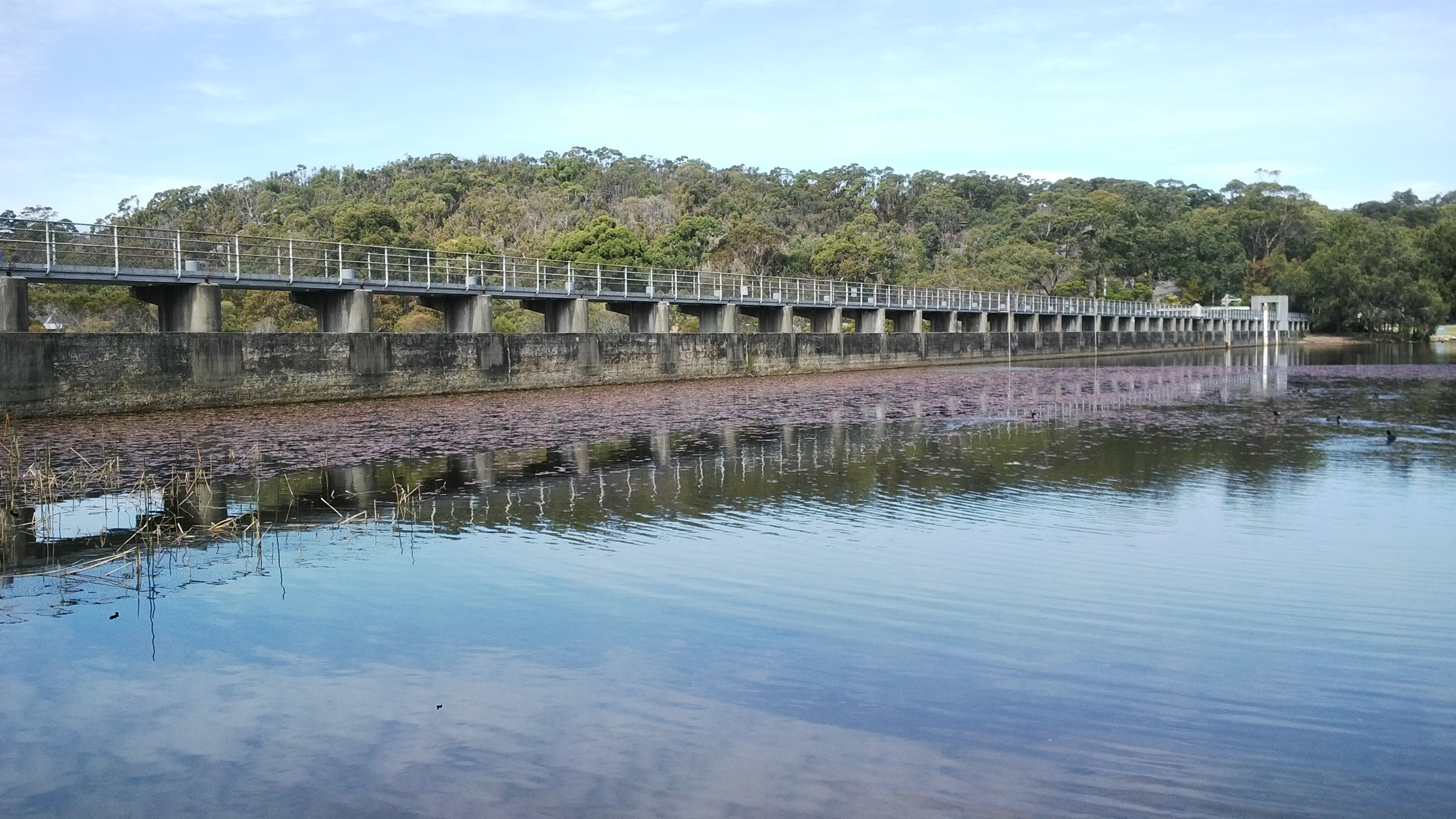
- Manly Dam wall

- Location of the dam in Greater Sydney
- Coordinates: 33°46′33″S 151°14′52″E
- Purpose: Multi-purpose: Initially potable water; Now recreation
- Status: Decommissioned
- Opening date: 1892
- Built by: NSW Department of Public Works
- Owner: Sydney Water

Dam and spillways
- Type of dam: Gravity dam
- Impounds: Curl Curl Creek
- Height (foundation): 20 m (66 ft)
- Length: 250 m (820 ft)
- Dam volume: 8×10^{3} m^{3} (280×10^{3} cu ft)
- Spillway type: Uncontrolled
- Spillway capacity: 400 m^{3}/s (14,000 cu ft/s)

Reservoir
- Total capacity: 2,000 ML (441×10^{6} imp gal)
- Catchment area: 5.52 km^{2} (2.13 sq mi)
- Surface area: 30 hectares (74 acres)
- Normal elevation: 35 metres (115 ft) AHD

New South Wales Heritage Register
- Official name: Manly Dam
- Type: State heritage (complex / group)
- Designated: 18 November 1999
- Reference no.: 1327
- Type: Water Supply Reservoir/ Dam
- Category: Utilities – Water
- Builders: Public Works Department

The Manly Dam is a heritage-listed dam near King Street, Manly Vale with a reservoir extending into Allambie Heights, both in the Northern Beaches Council local government area of New South Wales, Australia. It is often used as a place to have recreational activities. The reservoir is located within the Manly Dam Reserve. The dam was designed by the NSW Department of Public Works and built in 1892 by the Department. The reservoir and dam is owned by Sydney Water, an agency of the Government of New South Wales. The reservoir and dam was added to the New South Wales State Heritage Register on 18 November 1999.

== History ==
Manly Dam was built in 1892 by the NSW Department of Public Works as a water supply dam for the Manly area, which was progressively called on to supply neighbouring suburbs such as Balgowlah and Seaforth and eventually the coastal strip of the former Warringah Shire, to as far north as Mona Vale.

The gravity dam was constructed as a mass concrete structure with a maximum height of 19 metres (62 ft) and length of 250 metres (820 ft). Its catchment area covers 520 hectares (1,300 acres) to Frenchs Forest. The dam was constructed by the NSW Department of Public Works for the local council under a special Act of Parliament as part of a complete water supply scheme for Manly. It consisted of a dam, pumping station, rising main, service reservoir and reticulation. It was operated by the council for ten years until it was resumed by the Metropolitan Water Sewerage and Drainage Board in January 1902, at its original cost of A£37,820, less the amount the council had paid off already.

The concrete dam was designed to hold 310.12 megalitres (68,216×10^{3} imp gal) and was upgraded in 1909 with an enlarged by-wash being excavated on the eastern side and the old by-wash built up, thus enabling the top level of the reservoir to be raised and the storage capacity increased to 380 megalitres (84×10^{6} imp gal). In 1914, the capacity was raised further to 411,000 megalitres (90.5×10^{9} imp gal) and then in 1922 to 2,000 megalitres (441×10^{6} imp gal) with the top water level being 35 metres (115 ft) AHD.

In 1920, a filtration plant was installed, consisting of a settling and coagulating basin, gravel and sand filter beds, inspection chambers and a clear water basin. By 1928, increasing demand for water had overtaken the dam's capacity and in 1929, it was phased out, with supply for Warringah and Manly being provided by pipeline from the main metropolitan system at Pymble Reservoir. In 1936, the pumping installation was dismantled, following the commissioning of an amplified connection to the main metropolitan system, the completion of a 10-billion-imperial-gallon (45 GL) reservoir at Rocky Hill and the progressive development of the Upper Nepean Scheme.

Despite this, during an extensive drought period from 1934 to 1942, the dam was again brought into service, with pumps transferred from Engadine. During a nine and a half month period up to October 1942, 975 megalitres (34.4×10^{6} cu ft) of water were drawn to supplement Sydney's supply. From 1942, parts of the former water treatment plant downstream of the dam were reused in association with a hydraulics laboratory set up by the Department of Water Conservation and Irrigation. The Department of Public Works set up similar facilities in 1944. The Metropolitan Water Sewerage and Drainage Board also established water hydraulics experimental facilities and in 1955, the University of Technology (now the University of NSW) also established hydraulics laboratories. These facilities remain in use, although ownership and administration has varied between departments at times. The dam wall was strengthened in 1979-81 to bring the dam up to current safety standards. The methods used involved the sinking of long, vertical, steel tendons into the rock foundations but free in the dam wall itself, to permit future load monitoring and adjustment, and then anchored in heads specially designed for these tests on the crest of the dam. This technique was considered revolutionary at the time and gained world recognition when a paper was presented by Sydney Water Board engineers to the 14th Congress of the International Commission on Large Dams in Rio de Janeiro in 1982.

== Description ==
The dam is a mass concrete gravity structure with a maximum height of 19 to 20 metres (62 to 66 ft) and a length of 250 metres (820 ft). The dam wall impounds the Curl Curl Creek some 3 kilometres (1.9 mi) north west of Manly with a catchment area of approximately 520 hectares (1,300 acres) extending to Frenchs Forest in the north. The catchment area and stored water of the dam are now used primarily for public recreation. The stored water is also utilised as a supply for the adjoining hydraulic investigation laboratories of Sydney Water, the Public Works Department, and the University of New South Wales.

The dam wall and its associated features appear to be in good condition and intact. Between 1979 and 1981, it was strengthened using a new method of vertical steel tendons anchored onto rock foundations and the crest of the dam; also known as post-tensioning.

== Heritage listing ==
As at 9 May 2005, Manly Dam was a representative example of a medium-sized, concrete gravity dam of the late nineteenth century, as regards both design and construction. It has historical significance for its role in the historical development of Sydney's water supply, in particular as being an independent scheme, built despite the fact that the renowned first stage of the Upper Nepean Scheme, a comprehensive, long-term scheme with capacity for progressive augmentation by the successive construction of major dams on the contributing rivers, had recently been completed. It has technical significance as a representative example of its type and for the pioneering strengthening methodology which was developed for this dam. The dam is a rare remnant of an independent water supply system within the Sydney Metropolitan Area, providing evidence of the progressive and independent development of Sydney's suburbs, and has local aesthetic value. The former treatment plant and pumping station buildings are also significant but are not owned by the Sydney Water Corporation.

Manly Dam was listed on the New South Wales State Heritage Register on 18 November 1999 having satisfied the following criteria.

The place is important in demonstrating the course, or pattern, of cultural or natural history in New South Wales.

The dam is the largest example of an independent water supply system within the Sydney Metropolitan Area. The dam played an important role as an independent water supply scheme for the northern beaches area of Sydney. The dam is a relic of the period when the northern beaches were remote from the major areas of settlement in Sydney, prior to the opening of the Sydney Harbour Bridge. The dam was designed and built by the NSW Department of Public Works and is associated with the prominent engineers in this department at this time, particularly, E. O. Moriarty and C. W. Darley . The dam is an early example of the government initiative of the early 1890s, allowing local councils to raise loans for water supply purposes. The dam is one of the last of its size and type designed by the NSW Dept of Public Works as a gravity wall, prior to the general adoption of curved concrete walls for small dams.

The place is important in demonstrating aesthetic characteristics and/or a high degree of creative or technical achievement in New South Wales.

The Manly Dam is a simple and attractive construction, located in a picturesque setting. The dam is a good example of a basic concrete-walled gravity dam. The dam is an impressive structure, with its relatively thin wall standing between the water body of the reservoir on the west and the void and valley floor on the east.

The place has a strong or special association with a particular community or cultural group in New South Wales for social, cultural or spiritual reasons.

The Manly Dam is highly regarded by the public as represented by the National Trust of Australia (NSW), as evidenced by its identification in the National Trust Register.

The place has potential to yield information that will contribute to an understanding of the cultural or natural history of New South Wales.

Manly Dam is a century-old, mass-concrete gravity dam which has no operational imperative, making it an ideal facility for a range of experimental and research activities. Manly Dam is of technical significance for its association with the Hydraulics Laboratories in the former water treatment plant and its continuing role in the provision of experimental facilities. The dam is the site of on-going testing and monitoring of the wall-strengthening methodology pioneered at this dam.

The place possesses uncommon, rare or endangered aspects of the cultural or natural history of New South Wales.

Manly Dam is the largest and most developed of the surviving Sydney regional independent water supply schemes. Manly Dam is one of the very few substantial dam structures located within the suburbs of Sydney. Manly Dam was the site of a dam strengthening program which pioneered a world-first technology and which has subsequently become an accepted procedure for this purpose.

The place is important in demonstrating the principal characteristics of a class of cultural or natural places/environments in New South Wales.

The Manly Dam is a representative example of a small concrete gravity dam structure of the late nineteenth century. Manly Dam is representative of a range of small dams erected for water supply purposes in NSW by the NSW Department of Public Works between the 1890s and 1930s.

== See also ==
- List of reservoirs and dams in New South Wales
