= Curl Curl =

- Suburb
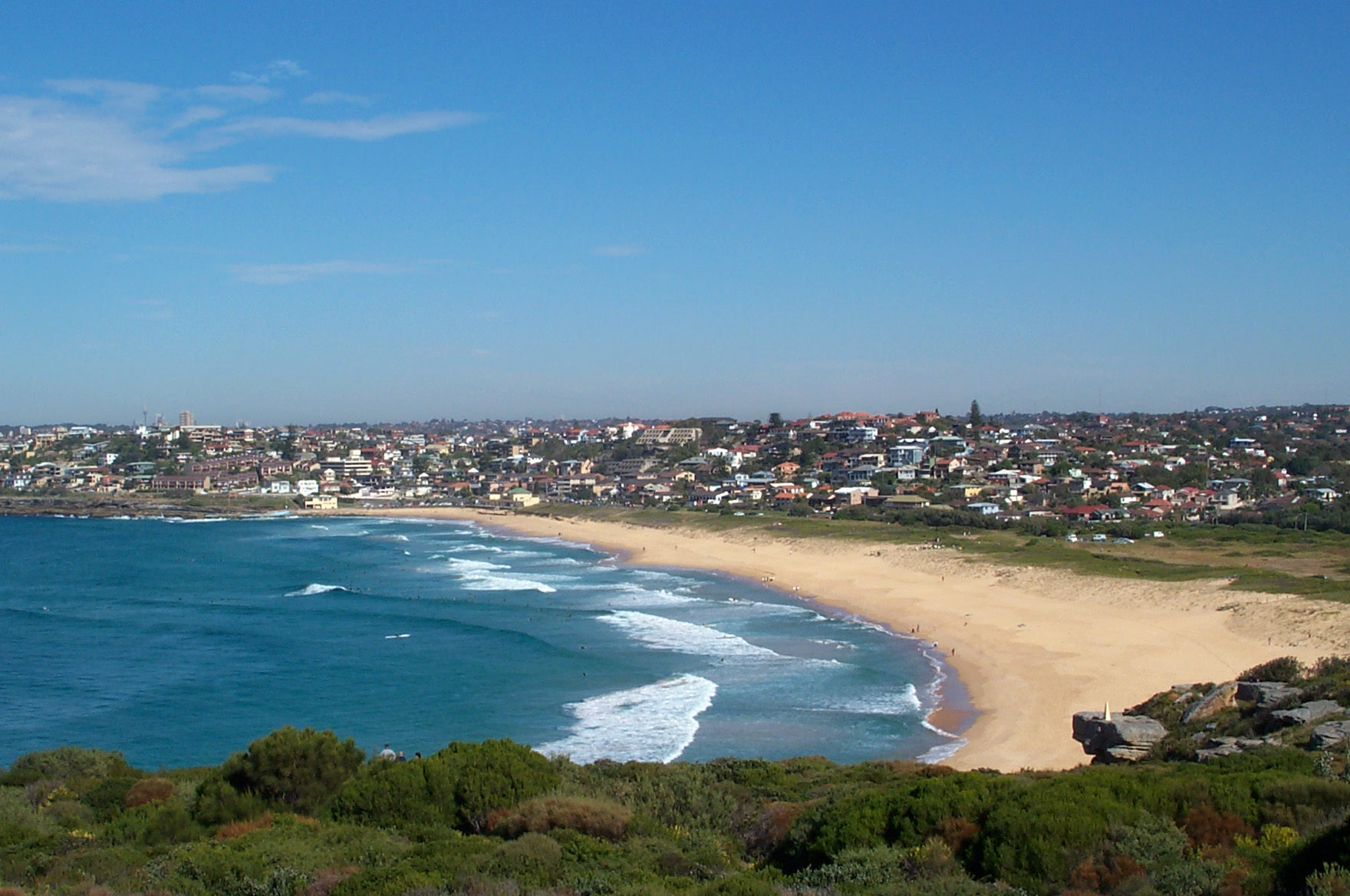
- Curl Curl Beach viewed from the north

- Interactive map of Curl Curl
- Country: Australia
- State: New South Wales
- City: Sydney
- LGA: Northern Beaches Council
- Location: 18 km (11 mi) north-east of Sydney CBD

Government
  - State electorate: Manly
  - Federal division: Warringah
- Elevation: 11 m (36 ft)

Population
  - Total: 2,364 (2021 census)
- Postcode: 2096
Suburbs around Curl Curl
Dee Why	North Curl Curl
Brookvale	Curl Curl	Pacific Ocean
North Manly	Freshwater

Curl Curl is a suburb of northern Sydney in the state of New South Wales, Australia, 18 kilometres (11 mi) north-east of the Sydney central business district, in the local government area of Northern Beaches Council. It is part of the Northern Beaches region.

== Location ==
Curl Curl Lagoon and Greendale Creek, separate Curl Curl from North Curl Curl. Neighbouring suburbs include Freshwater (boundary along Brighton Street), Brookvale (boundary along Harbord Road), and North Curl Curl (boundary along John Fisher Park) Wingala is an adjacent locality. Curl Curl Beach runs along the eastern border and extends to North Curl Curl Beach.

== Beach ==
The stretch of beach at Curl Curl is divided into North and South Curl Curl beaches. Curl Curl is known for some of the best surfing on the Northern Beaches.

Curl Curl Beach has two volunteer surf lifesaving clubs, South Curl Curl SLSC established in 1918 and North Curl Curl SLSC established in 1922. Northern Beaches Council employs professional lifeguards to patrol this beach from the end of September until Anzac Day. There are saltwater rockpools at each end of the beach.

== History ==
The name Curl Curl appears to be the original Aboriginal name for the larger area of Manly Vale, Freshwater, Queenscliff. The name Curl Curl may have been derived from a Dharuk Aboriginal phrase curial curial, meaning river of life.

The name Curl Curl Lagoon was originally applied to Manly Lagoon, which empties into the ocean at Queenscliff. The lagoon that empties into the ocean at Curl Curl Beach was named Harbord Lagoon until it was renamed Curl Curl Lagoon as part of a renaming program in the 1980s. Manly Creek was originally named Curl Curl Creek and Queenscliff Headland was called Curl Curl Headland.

In 1858 Samuel Bennett (who died 1903) paid £600 for an 80-acre (32 ha) property, in the Curl Curl/Brookvale area south of Greendale Creek and was farmed by Bennett up until the mid-1870s. This area was later known as Brighton Park.

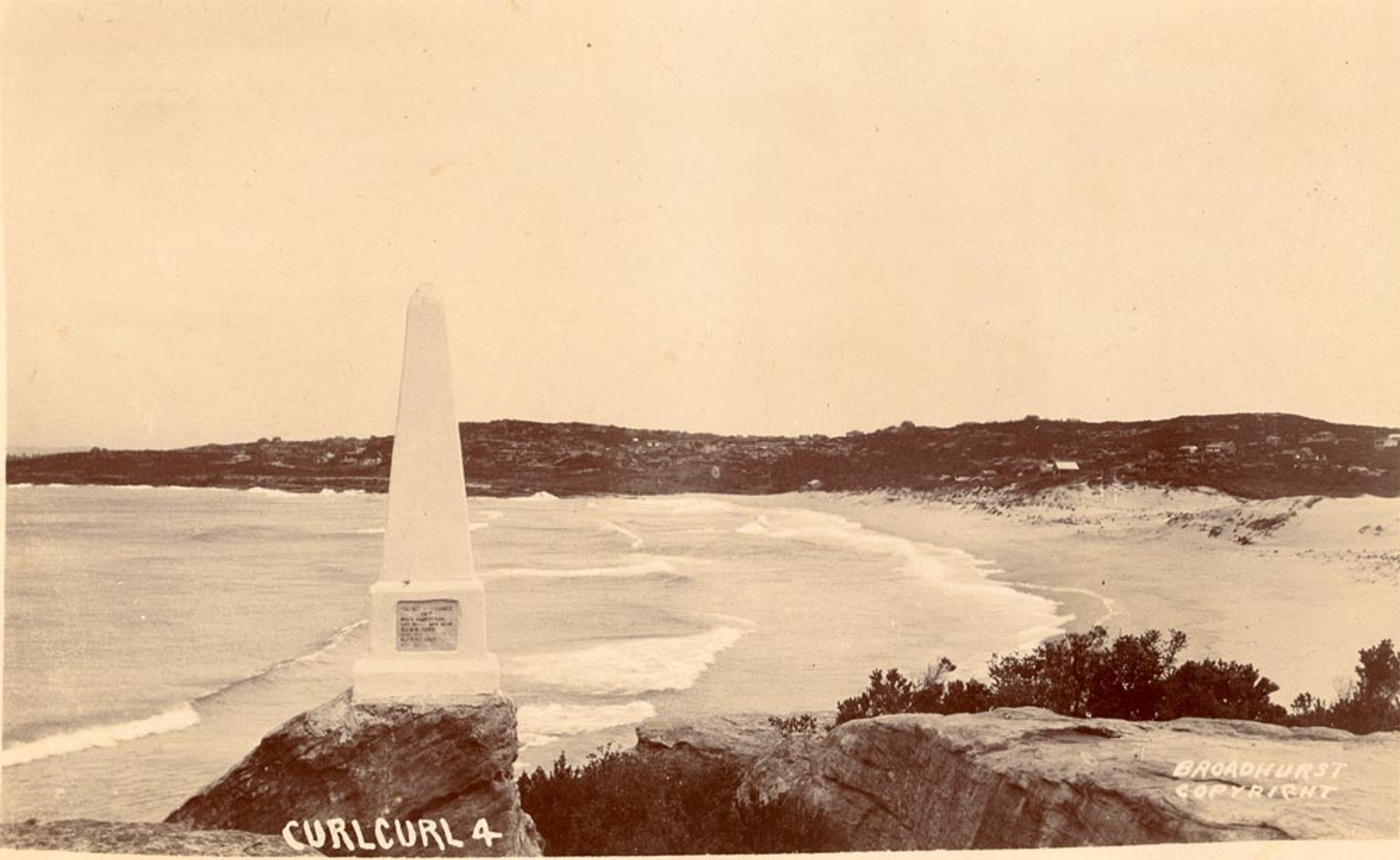
Curl Curl Beach looking South ~1900-1927

Land for St. James Anglican Church was dedicated on 3 November 1928, was opened in 1929 which is now the Warringah Church of Christ on Park Street.

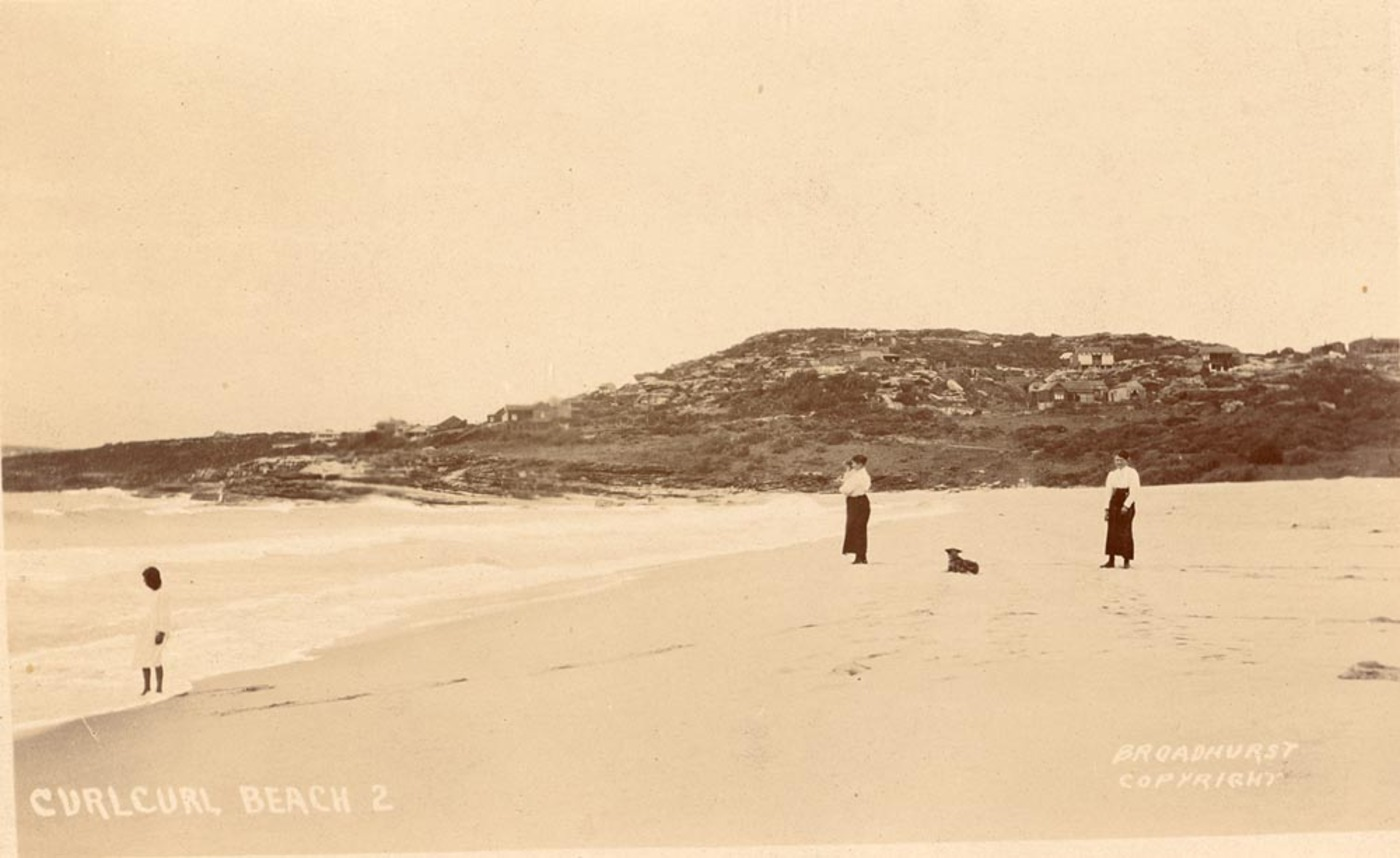
Curl Curl Beach by Broadhurst, William Henry, 1855-1927

== Population ==
At the 2021 census, there were 2,364 residents in Curl Curl. 72.7% of people were born in Australia. The next most common country of birth was England at 8.1%. 87.8% of people only spoke English at home. The most common responses for religion were No Religion 47.7%, Catholic 25.5% and Anglican 13.1%.

Family households at 82.6% were the main type of household, with single person households at 14.2%. Median monthly mortgage payments were $3,775, much higher than the national median of $1,863.

== Environment ==
Curl Curl went from being a pristine environment to a tip during the 20th Century. banked by sandstone hills to the South, the ocean to the East and Greendale Creek / Curl Curl Lagoon to the North. In 1980 the local community formed Curl Curl Lagoon Friends to bring the lagoon and its catchment back to good health.

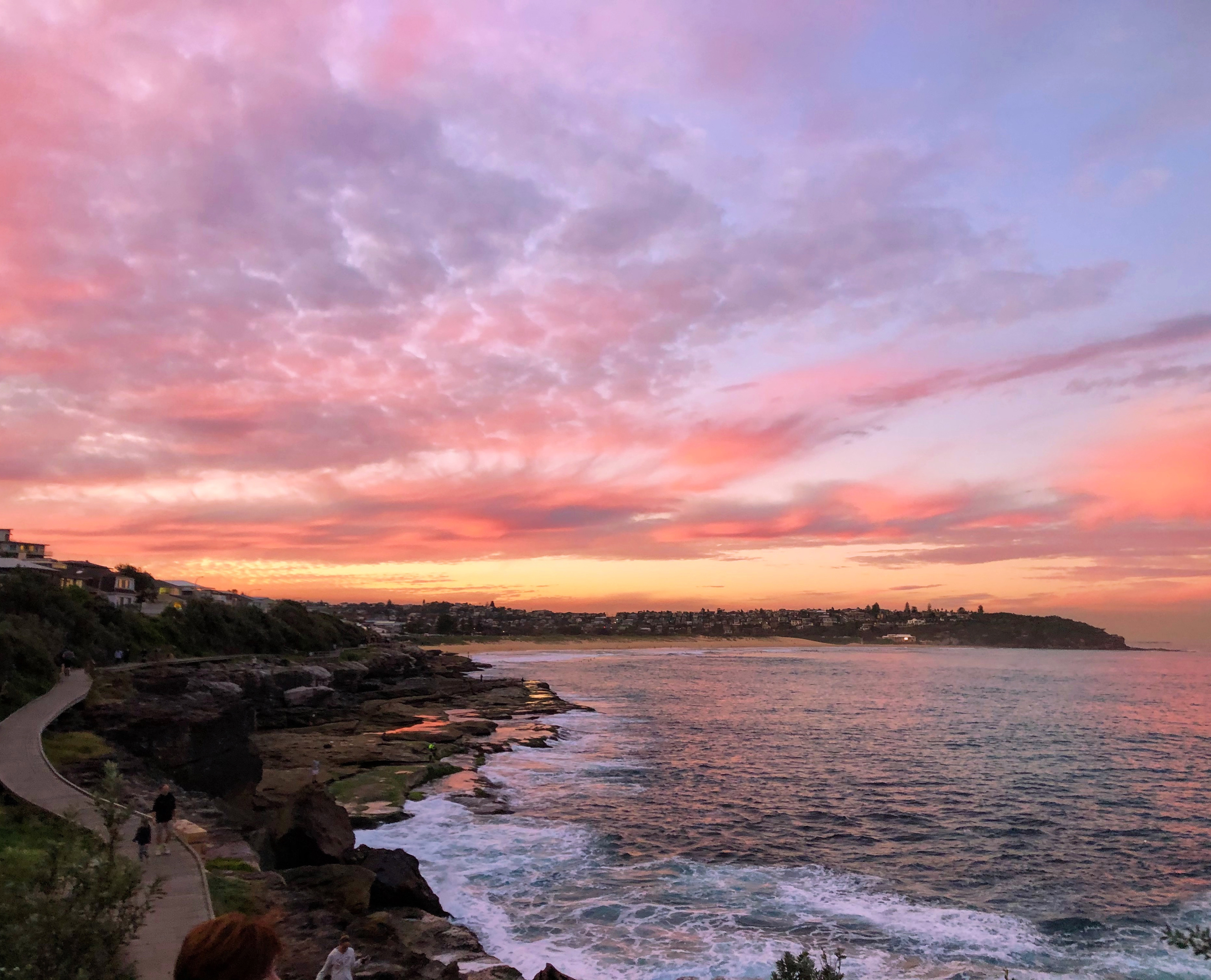
Boardwalk from Freshwater Beach to South Curl Curl

== Sport and recreation ==
Parks and playing fields are located on either side of Curl Curl Lagoon and Greendale Creek. These areas were originally low-lying swampy land that was reclaimed by dumping rubbish on both sides of the lagoon throughout the 1950s and 1960s.

Curl Curl Youth Club has organised soccer and netball since 1958.

Curl Curl Amateur Swimming Club runs regular Saturday afternoon swim events during the spring and summer months at the South Curl Curl rock pool. In the winter months, the South Curl Curl rock pool is home to the Harbord Frigid Frogs. The club hosts swims every Sunday morning at 10.00 am.

1st/2nd Harbord Scouts meet at the scout hall at 43 Stirgess Ave. The Scout hall was opened in 1957 after Mrs Olive Pinkerton donated the land, with Scouts meeting at St. James school hall on Curl Curl Parade from 1929

Harbord Bowling & Recreation Club has four greens and regularly holds world-class tournaments.

There are 2 dog parks in Curl Curl. One in Adam Street reserve South of the lagoon and one in Flora and Richie Roberts reserve behind the sand dunes. Dogs are allowed to enter the lagoon at the North East corner of the park. The water quality is not very good so the community group Curl Curl Dogs has asked the council for permission to allow dogs on a section of the beach for limited periods.

== Public transport ==
Curl Curl is serviced by three bus routes, 166 Manly to Frenchs Forest, 167 Manly to Warringah Mall and 165X South Curl Curl to Sydney CBD.

== Schools ==
Curl Curl is home to two secondary schools, both part of Northern Beaches Secondary College: Freshwater Senior Campus on the corner of Harbord Road and Brighton Street, and Manly Campus a selective school for year 7 to 12 students, located on the corner of Abbott Road and Harbord Road, Curl Curl. Until 2026, Freshwater Senior Campus only enrolled year 11 and 12 students. It will also accept Year 7 and Year 9 students in 2026 and will officially operate as a Year 7 to 12 campus from 2027.

Stewart House is located across the road from South Curl Curl beach and each year welcomes some 1,600 public school children in need from many parts of New South Wales and the Australian Capital Territory.

Curl Curl North Public School is a primary school located at Playfair Road near Abbott Road.

== Wildlife ==
=== Bird life ===
The lagoon and creek provide refuge for numerous birds, both those that depend primarily on the water and its fringes for food and breeding (the water birds), and many others that feed in the trees and the grassy areas that surround the lagoon (the bush birds).

Some of the birds of Curl Curl
Australian pelican	Bar-tailed godwit	White-necked heron
Great cormorant	Black swan	Great egret
Little black cormorant	Australasian swamphen	Intermediate egret
Pied cormorant	Australian wood duck	Eastern cattle egret
Silver gull	Chestnut teal	Little egret
Caspian tern	Grey teal	Nankeen night heron
Black-winged stilt	Hardhead	Royal spoonbill
Black-fronted dotterel	Pacific black duck	Australian white ibis
Masked lapwing	Australasian grebe	Straw-necked ibis
Latham's snipe	White-faced heron	Buff-banded rail

== See also ==
- List of reduplicated Australian place names
