= Queenscliff =

Queenscliff may refer to:

- Queenscliff, New South Wales, Australia
- Queenscliff, Victoria, Australia

== See also ==
- Queenscliffe, a local government area in Victoria, Australia
