= Manly Dam Reserve =

Protected area in New South Wales, Australia

- Location within New South Wales
- Location: New South Wales
- Nearest city: Manly, New South Wales, Australia
- Coordinates: 33°46′33″S 151°14′52″E
- Area: 3.76 km^{2} (1.45 sq mi)

The Manly Dam Reserve, also known as the Manly Warringah War Memorial Park, is an urban bushland reserve on the Northern Beaches of Sydney, New South Wales, Australia. Covering approximately 376 hectares, the reserve adjoins the south‑eastern boundary of Garigal National Park and surrounds the Manly Dam reservoir, which occupies about 30 hectares within the park.

The reserve developed around Manly Dam, a man‑made reservoir created in 1892 by the construction of a gravity dam across Curl Curl Creek to supply water to the growing township of Manly. Following World War I, the surrounding catchment was designated as a war memorial park commemorating Australian service personnel. Today, Manly Dam Reserve is recognised for its ecological, recreational and cultural significance, supporting diverse native vegetation and wildlife within a highly urbanised area while providing opportunities for outdoor recreation and memorial services.

== Dam ==
The reserve is centred on a man-made reservoir known as Manly Dam; formed by the construction of a gravity dam across the Curl Curl Creek. Curl Curl Creek was originally dammed in 1892 to create a reservoir with a capacity of 310 megalitres (68.2×10^{6} imp gal) to provide a permanent supply of fresh water for the nearby village of Manly. The original 11-metre (37 ft) high dam wall was subsequently raised in 1909, 1914 and 1922 to a final height of 35 metres (115 ft), increasing the capacity to 2,000 megalitres (441×10^{6} imp gal). However, as the population of the area grew, the dam's capacity became insufficient.

Water supply from Manly Dam had been augmented with supply from the main metropolitan system starting in 1906, initially from Mosman reservoir. By 1928 it was realised that Manly Dam had reached its limits and all future expansion would rely on the main metropolitan system. A trunk main was therefore laid from the Pymble reservoir and pumping from Manly Dam ceased in 1933. Briefly in 1942 after a period of drought, pumps were reinstalled and Manly Dam was brought back into service for nearly 10 months.

In the early 1990s engineers installed a large enclosed powered propeller against the dam wall on the reservoir side to prevent silt building up against the wall and causing damage to the structure. The propeller's purpose is also to prevent stratification of the water body, thereby improving the water quality by preventing eutrophication.

The dam wall is listed on the New South Wales State Heritage Register, however it is outside the boundary of the reserve and its management remains the responsibility of Sydney Water.

== War memorial ==
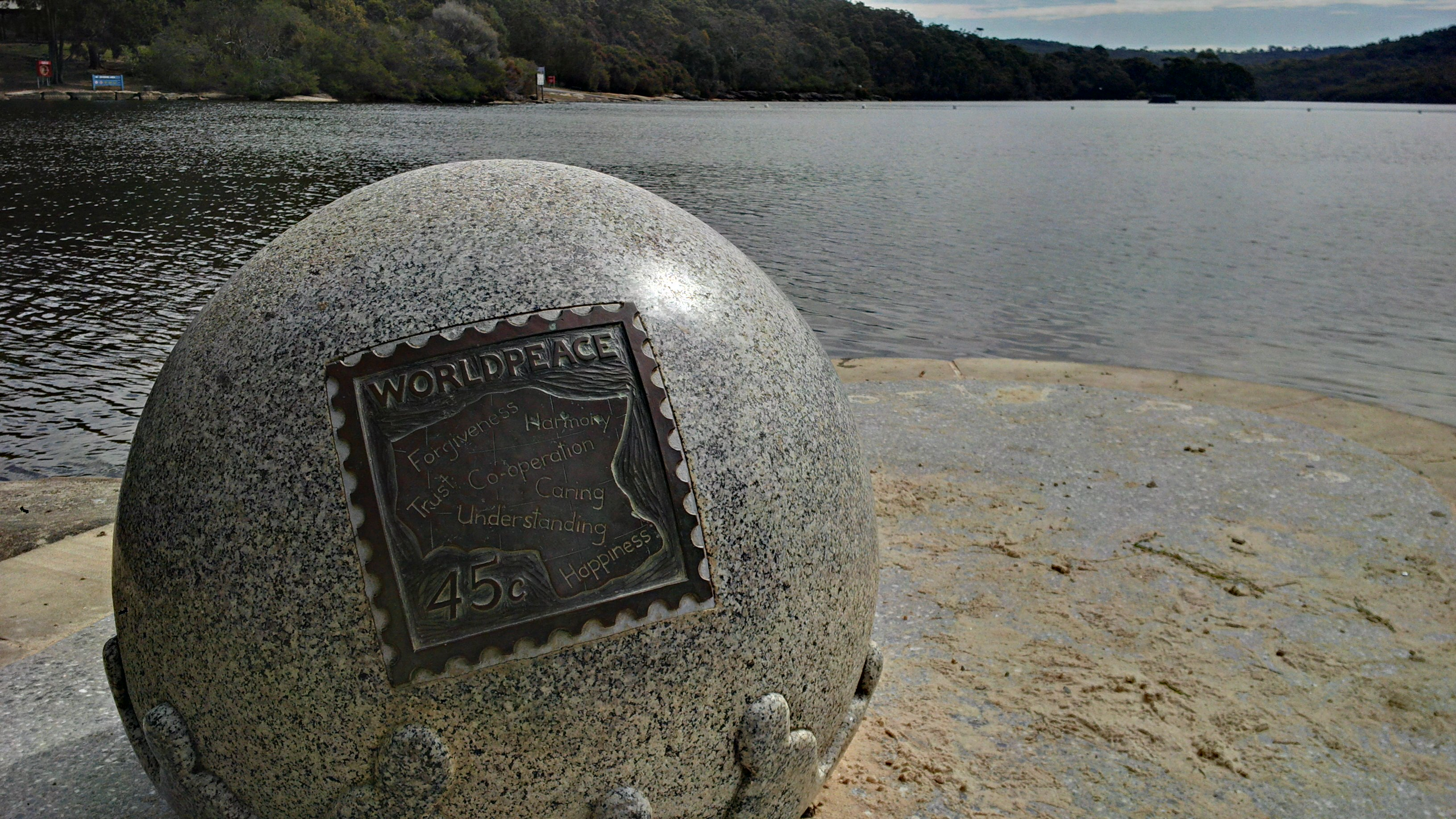
Manly Dam Memorial World Peace

Manly Dam was established as a War Memorial Park after World War I. A committee of ex-servicemen were given the responsibility of managing the bushland catchment of Manly Dam around 1920. The Manly Warringah War Memorial Park holds particular significance in remembering fallen service personnel from the First and Second World Wars, as well as being of significance to past and present day members of the Defence forces. The 1998 Plan of Management allowed for the development of a war memorial, sculptures and flagpole located in the Park's picnic areas. These became the focus of events on these special days each year. In 1995 the area was re-dedicated to the memory of service personnel as part of the “Australia Remembers” celebrations. The venue is valued by the community for these memorial services; the peaceful nature of the Park adding to its commemorative roles.

== Vegetation communities ==
The flora of the park is dominated by Hawkesbury sandstone vegetation and the endangered Duffy's Forest Ecological Community. Manly Dam Reserve has more than 300 native plant species recorded, including 18 different species of native orchids.

== Wildlife ==
The diverse range of plant communities in the Manly Dam Reserve provide a home to a wide variety of native wildlife.

The parks mammal population includes the commonly seen brushtailed possums, ringtail possums, swamp wallabies, brown antechinus, bush rats, long-nosed bandicoots and short-beaked echidnas. More secretive and less commonly seen species include a range of microbats including the threatened eastern bent-wing bat; the threatened eastern pygmy possum and grey-headed fruit bat. There are also records of koalas and spotted-tailed quolls being seen within the reserve.

More than 80 species of birds have been recorded from the Park, including a variety of waterbirds and migratory species. The Park also provides an important refuge for many species such as wrens and thornbills which are becoming increasingly rare in urban bushland areas. Large predatory birds such as Powerful Owls are also regularly sighted in the reserve.

Reptiles are commonly encountered by visitors to the park with eastern water dragons, water skinks and lace monitors and a variety of smaller skinks and geckos often seen near picnic areas and along walking tracks. The much rarer Rosenbergs or heath monitor can sometimes be seen by keen observers in more remote areas of the Park. Although red-bellied black snake and common brown snakes are also often sighted along tracks, the park is home to a range of less often seen snakes such as yellow-faced whipsnakes, marsh snakes, golden-crowned snakes, diamond pythons, blind snakes and tiger snakes. Eastern long-necked turtles also occur at the dam but are rarely seen by visitors.

Ten species of frogs have been recorded from the park including the common eastern froglet, eastern dwarf tree frog, striped marsh frogs, and Peron's tree frogs. Manly Dam Reserve is also home to the threatened red-crowned toadlet which is associated with the rocky ridges and drainages of the Hawkesbury Sandstone formation.

There are a variety of native and introduced fish in the waters of the reserve. Native fish include species such as climbing galaxias, Fire-tail gudgeon, and short-finned and long-finned eels. The climbing galaxias inhabits some of the less disturbed creeks and is able to climb up wet rock faces and cliffs with the aid of ridges on its fins, can breathe through its skin, and has lived in this once remote area, for an estimated 60 million years. Australian bass once occurred naturally in Curl Curl Creek but were unable to recolonise upstream areas once the dam wall was built in 1892 and blocked their access. Young Bass fingerlings are now regularly stocked into the dam by the NSW Department of Primary Industries to cater for recreational fishermen. A lone stocking of silver perch occurred in the early 1990s but these have not been stocked since as they are not native to the catchment area. Some of the introduced species include European carp, goldfish and the pest fish gambusia and redfin.

Manly Dam Reserve is also home to a wide variety of terrestrial and aquatic invertebrates and provides an ideal location for school, university and community groups to study them.

== Threats to conservation ==
In 1999 the local community mounted a vigil and blockade to try and stop the contentious "Ardel" housing development from proceeding at Allambie Heights in the upper catchment (now called Maddison Way). Over 1,000 people attended a demonstration near the site, the "Jam for the Dam" march and music event was organised in Manly, attended by over 4,000 people. There were also rallies at NSW parliament and Warringah Council. A golf tournament Save Manly Dam Golf Classic was held at Wakehurst Golf Club. The attendees included Peter Garrett, Tony Abbott, Cliff Lyons, Craig Riddington and Guy Leech. Ultimately the battle was lost and the development proceeded.

In 2014 the integrity of the Manly Dam Reserve was again threatened when the NSW Education Department lodged a development application with Warringah Shire Council (now known as the Northern Beaches Council) for the redevelopment and expansion of the Manly Vale Public School. The development would significantly increase the size of the school and would result in 4.37 hectares of significant native bushland being cleared from the Manly Dam Reserve for Fire Asset Protection Zones.

Concerned residents and members of the wider community objected to the proposal on several grounds: namely there being a significant fire and evacuation risk for the proposed increase in student numbers; parking and traffic issues in small residential streets; and the loss of significant areas of native bushland belonging to the Manly Dam Reserve and adjacent Council Land – home to a variety of protected and threatened native fauna and flora. Several threatened Species including the eastern pygmy possum, red-crowned toadlet, powerful owl, eastern bent-wing bat and the grey-headed fruit bat are known to occur in the area. Although a species impact statement was presented by the Education Department with the development application, a large number of wildlife species that are known to utilise the site were not recorded due to the limited survey period and time constraints.

The redevelopment of the Manly Vale Public School attracted media attention both in the local media and interstate.

On 20 December 2016 the school development was approved by the Sydney North Planning Panel. The administrator of the Northern Beaches Council Dick Persson said that the decision was not the council's position and maintained that “Council is strongly opposed in its current form as was the previously elected Council in Warringah.” He said his and the council's major concerns were the sprawl of the site, building over bushland instead of building up, bushfire risks and traffic congestion.

== Tracks ==
Manly Dam has a variety of walking tracks and mountain bike circuit of 9.72 kilometres (6.04 mi). The mountain bike circuit is very popular destination for mountain bike riders.

== Sports ==
There is a signposted swimming area marked out by buoys near the main car park and picnic area 1. The section of water between picnic areas 2 and 3 is a dedicated water skiing area and is prohibited for swimming and non-motorised water activities.

== Hydraulics Laboratories ==
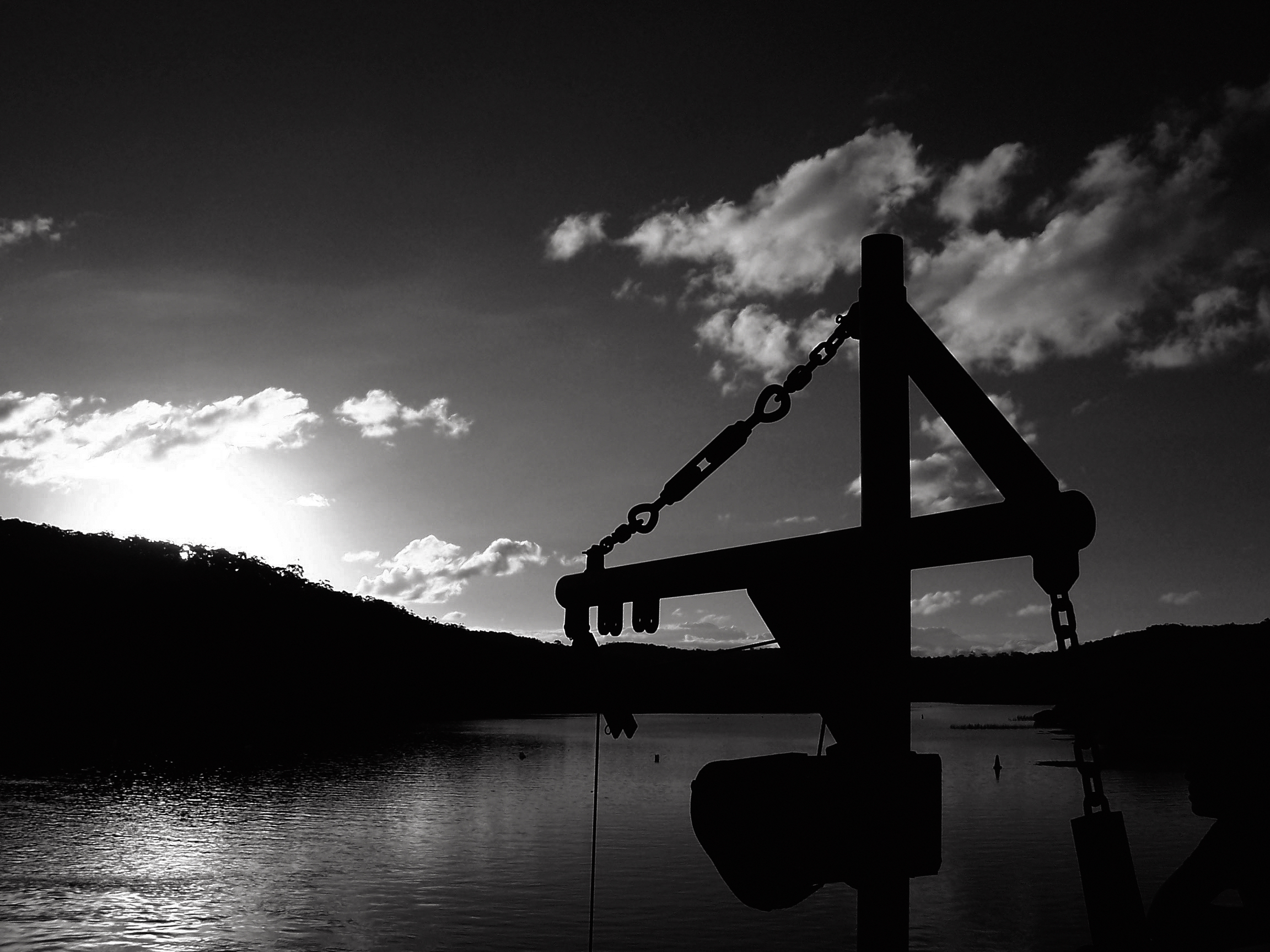
A view from the dam

Manly Hydraulics Laboratory is run by the NSW Government Department of Finance, Services and Innovation. The Water Research Laboratory is operated by the University of New South Wales. Both laboratories are located below the dam wall adjacent to Manly Dam Reserve.
