= Freshwater, New South Wales =

Freshwater
- Suburb
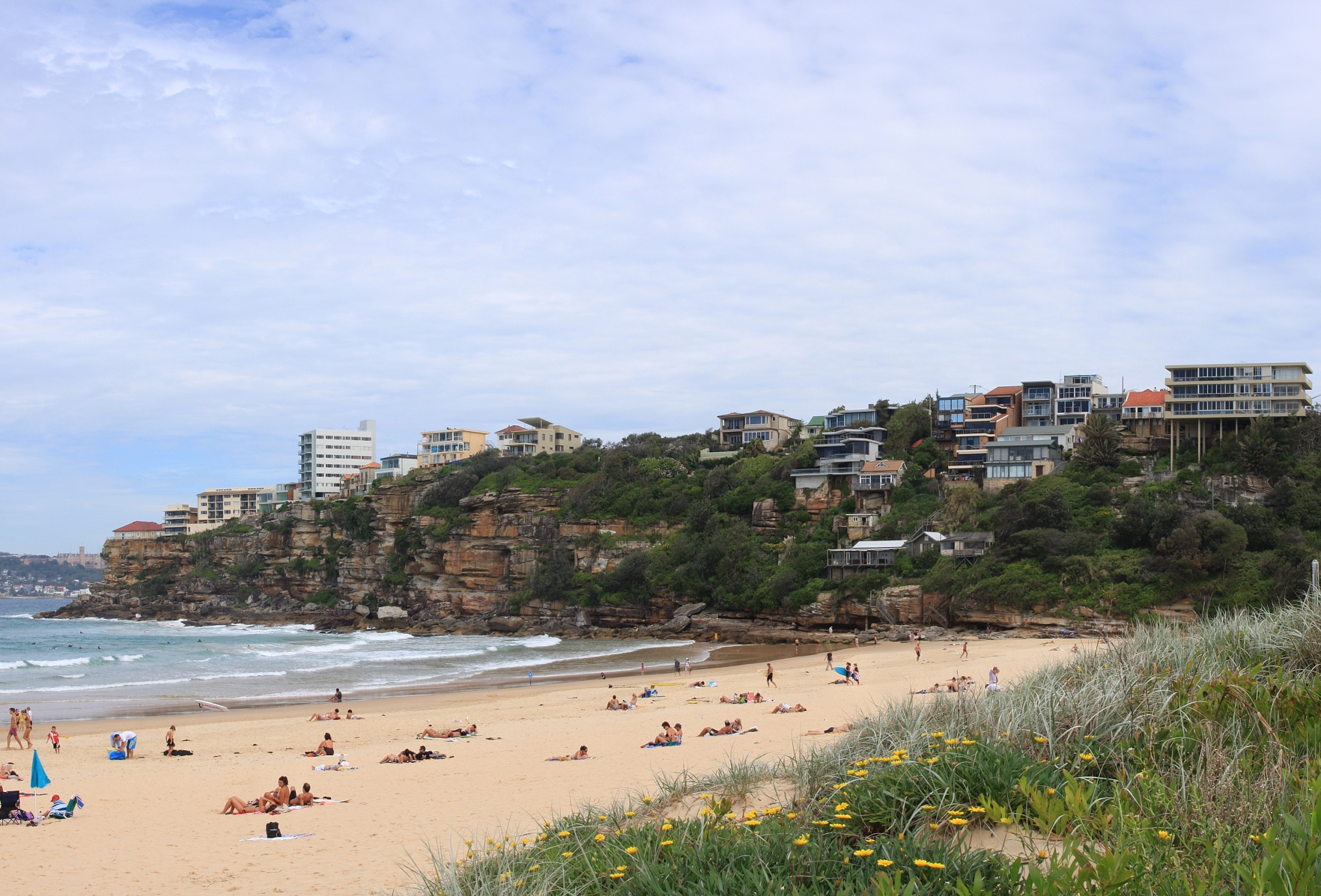
- Freshwater Beach

- Interactive map of Freshwater
- Country: Australia
- State: New South Wales
- City: Sydney
- LGA: Northern Beaches Council
- Location: 17 km (11 mi) north-east of Sydney CBD

Government
  - State electorate: Manly
  - Federal division: Warringah

Area
  - Total: 1.8 km^{2} (0.69 sq mi)
- Elevation: 9 m (30 ft)

Population
  - Total: 9,186 (2021 census)
  - Density: 5,100/km^{2} (13,200/sq mi)
- Postcode: 2096
Suburbs around Freshwater
Brookvale	Curl Curl
North Manly	Freshwater	Tasman Sea
Manly	Queenscliff

Freshwater is a suburb of northern Sydney, in the state of New South Wales, Australia. Freshwater is located 17 kilometres (11 mi) north-east of the Sydney central business district, in the local government area of Northern Beaches Council and is part of the Northern Beaches region.

== History ==
=== Aboriginal culture ===
The area was once fished and utilised by overlapping clans of the Garigal people to the north and the Gayamaygal to the south, and evidence of their habitation remains today in the form of the indigenous Australian art such as rock engravings, open campsites, and rock shelters.

== European settlement ==
The first Crown grant of land in the area was to Thomas Bruin on 27 September 1815, and consisted of 50 acres (20 ha) directly opposite the beach. The Manly Land Company subdivided and named the property Freshwater Estate in December 1884.

In 1886 W M Gordon surveyed the subdivision named Harbord Estate. The land, divided into two sections, north and south of Curl Curl Lagoon (now named Manly Lagoon) was offered for sale in August 1886.

== History of the suburb name ==
The Harbord Estate was named to honor the wife of New South Wales Governor Lord Carrington (gov. 1885–90). Before her marriage, Lady Carrington was the Honorable Cecilia Margaret Harbord.

For many years, the beach and the district behind it was known as Freshwater which was probably named after the stream of fresh water that ran down to the beach (now Kooloora Ave). However, some time after the naming of Harbord Estate, a number of residents began to believe that the holiday image of Freshwater should be upgraded by a name change to Harbord. The change of name attracted much controversy and debate and occasionally became quite heated. When the first local district school was built in 1912, a petition was sent to the Minister of Education requesting it should be called Harbord Public School. The Minister declined and officially opened the school as Freshwater Public School. Pressure was then directed towards renaming the post office. The Postmaster-General finally accepted the views of those who wanted a residential image and Freshwater officially became Harbord on 1 September 1923.

Freshwater Bay Post Office opened on 20 April 1909 and was renamed Freshwater in 1912.

In 2003 the Harbord Chamber of Commerce submitted a request to Warringah Council to support an application to the Geographical Names Board of New South Wales to rename the suburb of Harbord to Freshwater. In public consultation 774 voted in favour and 161 voted against with the results recorded in council minutes on 8 March 2005. The suburb of Harbord was officially named Freshwater on 12 January 2008.

== Council ==
Along with all the suburbs of the Northern Beaches, Freshwater became part of the Northern Beaches Council on 12 May 2016. This followed the amalgamation of Manly, Pittwater and Warringah Councils.

== Australian home of surfing ==
In December 1914, Duke Kahanamoku, the world sprint swimming champion, was touring Australia. He selected timber from a Sydney firm to fashion a surfboard modelled on those used in his native Hawaii, and gave a demonstration to the press of surf board riding at Freshwater Beach on Thursday, 24 December. It was the second recorded time that anyone had surfed the clean waves beyond the break in Australian waters using the Hawaiian surfing technique. The first known surf board rider was Manly local, Tommy Walker, who rode a board at the 1912 Freshwater surf carnival.

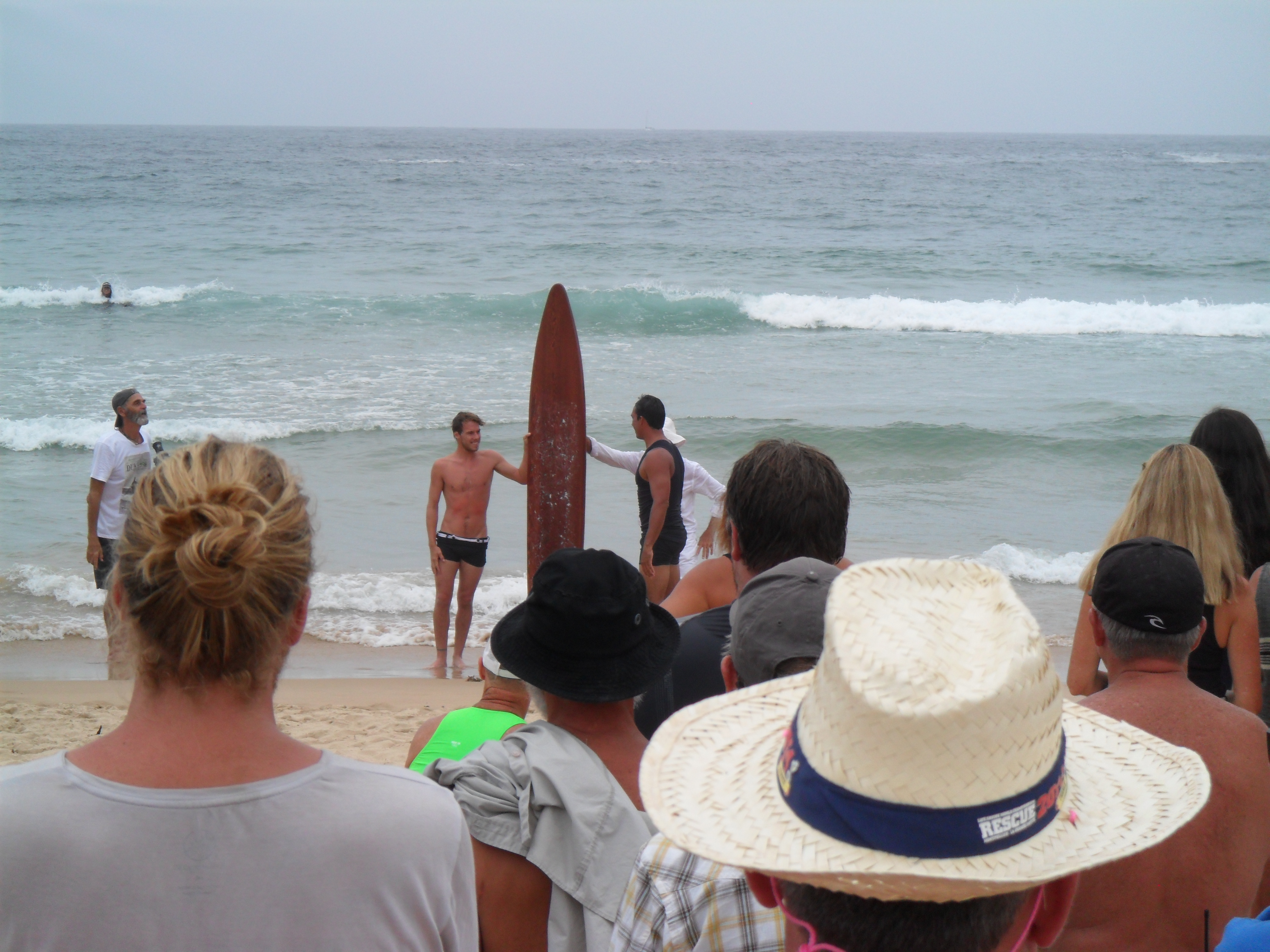
Re-enactment of Duke Kahanamoku visit and replica board, 2015

It was so popular that a second, spur-of-the-moment, demonstration was given on a Sunday in January 1915 at Dee Why beach. Kahanamoku topped the performance by taking a local young girl, Isabel Letham, on the board with him to surf the waves. Letham went on to become a pioneer of Australian surfing. The board has been on display in the Freshwater Surf Life Saving Club since 1952. There is now a statue of Duke Paoa Kahanamoku on the headland at Freshwater. The statue was sculpted by artist Barry Donohoo, one of the last works by the artist before his death.

In 2012, Warringah Council, in partnership with Freshwater Surf Life Saving Club, signed a Goodwill Beach City Agreement with the coastal community of Waikiki in Honolulu, Hawaii. The ceremony came as part of an annual celebration of the introduction of surfing to Australia by Duke Kahanamoku at Freshwater beach. The signing by Warringah Mayor, Michael Regan, and Honolulu Mayor, Peter Carlisle, was a celebration and strengthening of historic ties between the two regions.

== Population ==
At the 2021 census, there were 9,186 residents in Freshwater. 67.6% of people were born in Australia. The most common other countries of birth were England 9.1%, New Zealand 2.2%, United States of America 1.7%, Brazil 1.4% and South Africa 1.2%. 84.5% of people only spoke English at home. Other languages spoken at home included Spanish 1.8%, Portuguese 1.6%, Italian 1.1%, German 1.0% and French 1.0%. The most common responses for religion were No Religion 50.3%, Catholic 22.8% and Anglican 12.5%.

The median weekly household income of $2,726 was higher than the national median of $1,746. 53.1% of occupied private dwellings were flats or apartments, 41.7% were separate houses and 4.7% were semi-detached. The median monthly mortgage payment was $3,055.

== Notable people ==
- Tom Iredale (1880–1972), ornithologist and malacologist

== Schools ==
Freshwater is home to 2 primary education schools. Harbord Public School caters for students from years K-6 was established in 1912 and St John the Baptist Catholic School.

In neighbouring suburb Curl Curl, Freshwater Senior Campus which is part of Northern Beaches Secondary College, caters for year 11 and 12 students.

== Landmarks ==
Freshwater Beach is between Curl Curl and Queenscliff and lies on the Manly to Curl Curl Beach walk.

The Harbord Beach Hotel, which opened in 1928, is 200 metres (660 ft) from the beach and is known to locals as the "Harbord Hilton", due to its previous state of disrepair prior to renovations. Harbord Diggers, an RSL club, used to have bowling greens and views of the ocean, although recently was re-developed by the Mounties Group into a largely expensive over-55s seniors living complex with an RSL club underneath with limited views.

== Twin/sister cities ==
Waikiki Honolulu, Hawaii, United States
