= Division of Warringah =

Australian federal electoral division

Coordinates: 33.793°S 151.254°E

Warringah Australian House of Representatives Division
- Interactive map of electorate boundaries from the 2025 federal election
- Created: 1922
- MP: Zali Steggall
- Party: Community Strong
- Namesake: Warringah
- Electors: 126,914 (2025)
- Area: 51 km^{2} (19.7 sq mi)
- Demographic: Inner metropolitan
Electorates around Warringah:
Bradfield	Mackellar	Tasman Sea
Bennelong	Warringah	Tasman Sea
Sydney	Wentworth	Wentworth

Footnotes

The Division of Warringah (/wərɪŋɡə/ wə-RING-gə) is an Australian electoral division in the state of New South Wales. It is on the north shore of Port Jackson and the Tasman Sea coast, stretching from Wollstonecraft to Curl Curl, comprising North Sydney and Manly.

Since 2019 its MP has been Zali Steggall, representing Community Strong. From 1994 to 2019, the seat was held by Tony Abbott, who served as Prime Minister of Australia from 2013 to 2015.

== Geography ==
Centred on Mosman and the Northern Beaches region of Sydney, it covers most of the land between Middle Harbour and the Tasman Sea. It extends from Port Jackson in the south to the suburb of Curl Curl in the north.

Warringah includes the suburbs of Allambie, Allambie Heights, Balgowlah, Balgowlah Heights, Balmoral, Beauty Point, Brookvale, Cammeray, Clifton Gardens, Clontarf, Cremorne, Cremorne Point, Crows Nest, Curl Curl, Fairlight, Freshwater, Kirribilli, Kurraba Point, Lavender Bay, Manly, Manly Vale, McMahons Point, Milsons Point, Mosman, Neutral Bay, North Balgowlah, North Head, North Manly, North Sydney, Queenscliff, Seaforth, Wingala, Waverton and Wollstonecraft, as well as parts of Beacon Hill, Frenchs Forest and Narraweena.

Since 1984, federal electoral division boundaries in Australia have been determined at redistributions by a redistribution committee appointed by the Australian Electoral Commission. Redistributions occur for the boundaries of divisions in a particular state, and they occur every seven years, or sooner if a state's representation entitlement changes or when divisions of a state are malapportioned.

== History ==
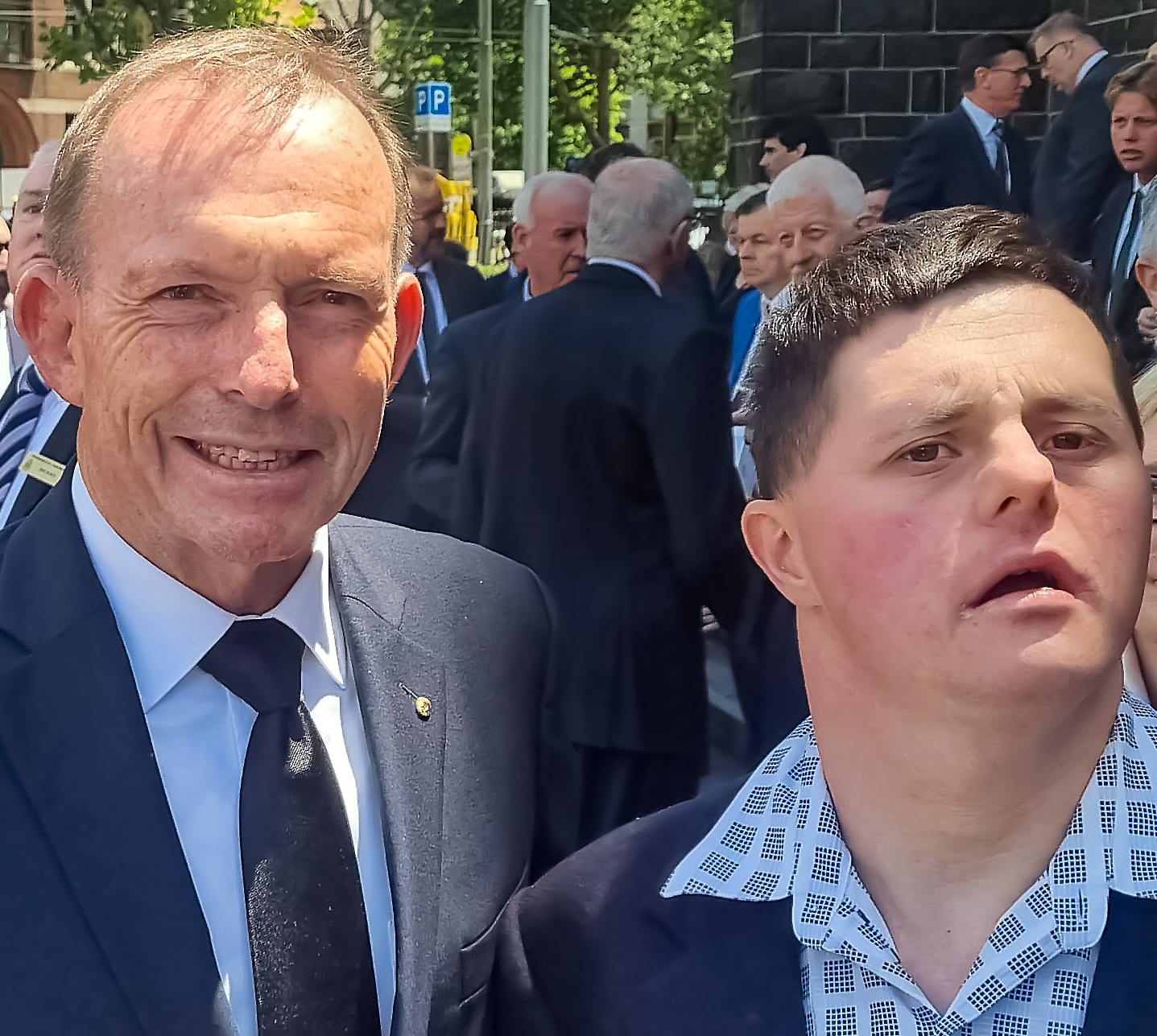
Abbott in 2024 with a man with down syndrome

The division is named after the Warringah area of Sydney, which itself is named by an Aboriginal Australian word which translates into English as "rain", "waves" or "sea". The Division was proclaimed at the redistribution of 13 September 1922, and was first contested at the 1922 federal election. Most of its territory had been part of North Sydney from 1901 to 1922. The word "Warrin ga" was recorded as the local name for Middle Harbour in 1832.

The electorate originally extended from Mosman to Pittwater. In 1949, it lost most of its territory in the north to the new Division of Mackellar. In 2025, it acquired an area around North Sydney from the abolished division of North Sydney.

Before 2019, the area covered by Warringah had been held by a conservative party without interruption since Federation. The Liberal Party of Australia and their predecessors held the seat without interruption from its creation until the 2019 federal election when Zali Steggall won the seat as an Independent. Even by northern Sydney standards, Warringah has been especially unfriendly territory for Labor. For example, even in its 1943 landslide, Labor was only able to garner 39 percent of the two-party vote in Warringah.

The seat's most notable member was Tony Abbott, who won the seat at a 1994 by-election and served as Prime Minister of Australia from 2013 to 2015. He retained Warringah until being defeated by Steggall in 2019. That election also saw Warringah become a notional marginal seat in a "traditional" two-party contest against Labor for the first time; Abbott would have held the seat on 52.1 percent against Labor, down from 61 percent in 2016. At the 2025 landslide, Labor won the two-party vote in Warringah.

== Members ==
Image	Member	Party	Term	Notes
	Sir Granville Ryrie (1865–1937)	Nationalist	16 December 1922 – 13 April 1927	Previously held the Division of North Sydney. Resigned to become the High Commissioner to the United Kingdom
	Sir Archdale Parkhill (1878–1947)	Nationalist	21 May 1927 – 7 May 1931	Served as minister under Lyons. Lost seat
	Sir Archdale Parkhill (1878–1947)	United Australia	7 May 1931 – 23 October 1937	Served as minister under Lyons. Lost seat
	Percy Spender (1897–1985)	Independent United Australia	23 October 1937 – 20 October 1938	Served as minister under Menzies and Fadden. Retired
	Percy Spender (1897–1985)	United Australia	20 October 1938 – 23 February 1944	Served as minister under Menzies and Fadden. Retired
	Percy Spender (1897–1985)	Independent	23 February 1944 – 13 September 1945	Served as minister under Menzies and Fadden. Retired
	Percy Spender (1897–1985)	Liberal	13 September 1945 – 28 April 1951	Served as minister under Menzies and Fadden. Retired
	Francis Bland (1882–1967)	Liberal	28 April 1951 – 2 November 1961	Retired
	John Cockle (1908–1966)	Liberal	9 December 1961 – 3 August 1966	Died in office
	Edward St John (1916–1994)	Liberal	26 November 1966 – 28 March 1969	Lost seat
	Edward St John (1916–1994)	Independent	28 March 1969 – 25 October 1969	Lost seat
	Michael MacKellar (1938–2015)	Liberal	25 October 1969 – 18 February 1994	Served as minister under Fraser. Resigned to retire from politics
	Tony Abbott (1957–)	Liberal	26 March 1994 – 18 May 2019	Served as minister under Howard. Served as Opposition Leader from 2009 to 2013. Served as Prime Minister from 2013 to 2015. Lost seat
	Zali Steggall (1974–)	Independent	18 May 2019 – 25 June 2026	Incumbent
	Zali Steggall (1974–)	Community Strong	25 June 2026 – present	Incumbent

== Election results ==
2025 Australian federal election: Warringah
Party	Candidate	Votes	%	±%
Independent	Zali Steggall	45,590	39.68	+7.16
Liberal	Jaimee Rogers	36,446	31.72	−2.55
Labor	Celine Varghese-Fell	16,738	14.57	+2.60
Greens	Bonnie Harvey	10,051	8.75	+0.87
One Nation	Gavin Wright	1,978	1.72	−0.06
Libertarian	Sean McLeod	1,504	1.31	+0.98
Trumpet of Patriots	Anthony Rose	1,417	1.23	+1.23
Independent	David Spratt	1,171	1.02	+1.02
Total formal votes		114,895	95.42	−1.15
Informal votes		5,520	4.58	+1.15
Turnout		120,415	92.09	+1.81
Notional two-party-preferred count
Labor	Celine Varghese-Fell	62,634	54.51	+5.25
Liberal	Jaimee Rogers	52,261	45.49	−5.25
Two-candidate-preferred result
Independent	Zali Steggall	70,318	61.20	+0.67
Liberal	Jaimee Rogers	44,577	38.80	−0.67
Independent hold		Swing	+0.67	
