= Matthew Myers (judge) =

Australian judge

His Honour Matthew Myers AM

Personal details
- Born: 1970 (age 55–56) Sydney, New South Wales, Australia
- Education: University of New South Wales, The College of Law Australia, Bond University
- Occupation: Judge; Judicial officer
- Known for: Commissioner Australian Law Reform Commission, ADJ Professor of Law UNSW., Australian Reconciliation

Matthew David Myers AM (born 10 November 1970) is a judge of the Federal Circuit and Family Court of Australia and an adjunct professor at the Faculty of Law, University of New South Wales. He is the first Aboriginal Australian to have been appointed as a federal court judge.

== Early life and education ==
Myers was born on 10 November 1970. He grew up in La Perouse located in Sydney's south and later moved with his family to Frenchs Forest, where he attended Forest High School (Sydney). Myers developed an interest in law at an early age after witnessing an event in which a lawyer intervened between citizens of Eveleigh Street and the police.

== Career ==
In 2015, Myers was criticised in the press for performing his own research and imposing his personal views in a decision. In February 2017 he was appointed as an Australian Law Reform Commission Commissioner to lead the inquiry into Incarceration rates of Aboriginal and Torres Strait Islander peoples. Myers is a Fellow of the Australian Academy of Law.

== See also ==
- Law Council of Australia
- Law Society of New South Wales
