= Brookvale, New South Wales =

Brookvale
- Suburb
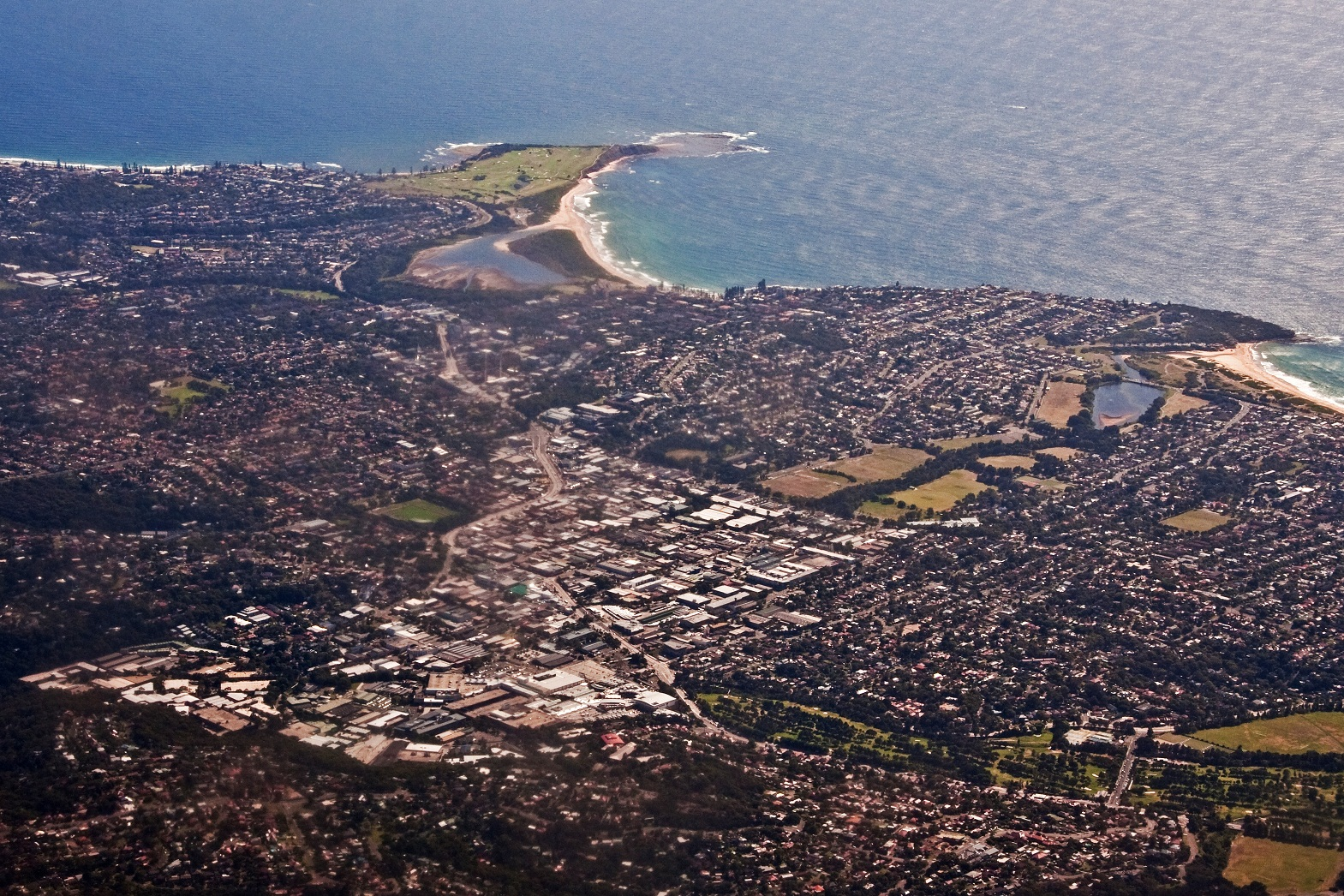

- Interactive map of Brookvale
- Country: Australia
- State: New South Wales
- City: Sydney
- LGA: Northern Beaches Council
- Location: 16 km (9.9 mi) north-east of Sydney CBD

Government
  - State electorates: Manly; Willoughby
  - Federal division: Warringah
- Elevation: 21 m (69 ft)

Population
  - Total: 3,389 (2021 census)
- Postcode: 2100
Suburbs around Brookvale
Beacon Hill	Narraweena	Dee Why
Alambie Heights	Brookvale	North Curl Curl
Manly Dam	North Manly	Curl Curl

Brookvale is a suburb of northern Sydney, in the state of New South Wales, Australia. Brookvale is 16 kilometres north-east of the Sydney central business district, in the local government area of Northern Beaches Council. It is part of the Northern Beaches region.

== History ==
The first development in the area was in 1836 when 64 hectares of farmland was granted to William Frederick Parker. In this period further land was sold to the Malcolm, Burns and Miles families. In 1883, Sydney Alexander Malcolm built what became known as 'Brookvale House'. It eventually was sold in 1961 to the Hooker Investment Corporation paving the way for the construction of Warringah Mall, which is the largest shopping complex in the area.

Brookvale had two post offices. Brookvale Post Office opened on 1 June 1888 and closed on 1 November 2013. The post office included a mail & parcel delivery & a collection service operated by Mailplus operated in that post office. Warringah Mall Post Office opened on 3 April 1963 as a second post office for Brookvale.

After World War II, much of the surrounding land was bought by immigrants, many of whom were Italian. The Curulli, Caputo and Bombardieri families own a large percentage of the land in Brookvale. Brookvale developed from farmland to manufacturing, warehousing, and in recent years there has been significant office space development. Because of the large presence of Pazzano immigrants, a little village of southern Italy, Brookvale is called by them "Pazzaniedu": Little Pazzano in the Calabrian dialect. Built in 1999, the Southern Cross Cable has a landing station in the suburb, which was commissioned in 2000.

== Demographics ==
According to the 2021 census, there were 3,389 residents in Brookvale. 55.0% of people were born in Australia. The most common countries of birth were England 5.9%, China 3.3% and Philippines 2.6%. 65.2% of people only spoke English at home. Other languages spoken at home included Spanish 2.9% and Italian 2.7%. The most common responses for religion in Brookvale were No Religion 41.7%, Catholic 23.6% and Anglican 7.9%.

== Commercial areas ==
Brookvale has a fast-growing business community, and is a major industrial area.

Westfield Warringah Mall is a large indoor/outdoor shopping centre in the southern part of the suburb.

A number of car dealerships and related vehicle services are located in Brookvale. Many printing and signage businesses are also located in Brookvale. Keolis Northern Beaches's Brookvale Bus Depot is located on Pittwater Road.

== Sport and recreation ==
Brookvale Oval is the home ground of the Manly-Warringah Sea Eagles National Rugby League team. Manly Leagues Club is located nearby. The land for Brookvale Oval was given to the people of Warringah for their recreational use in 1911 by Jane Try of Brookvale House. Known as "Fortress Brookvale" to Sea Eagles fans, the ground has a spectator capacity of 23,000 and includes the Jane Try Stand on the western side (this is where the change rooms and media facilities are located), the Fulton-Menzies stand at the southern end with "The Hill" on the east and north. Brookvale also has four television standard light towers to allow for night games.

In 2014, the North Harbour Rays announced Brookvale Oval as their home ground for the inaugural National Rugby Championship season.

1st Brookvale Scout group, formed in 1947, still meets at the scout hall in Winbourne Road. The group merged with 1st North Curl Curl in the early 2000s and is now known as Brookvale Curl Curl Scout Group.

== Education ==
Brookvale has two schools – Brookvale Public School and St Augustine's College.

Brookvale also has a TAFE NSW college located on Old Pittwatter Road.
