= Allambie Heights =

- Suburb
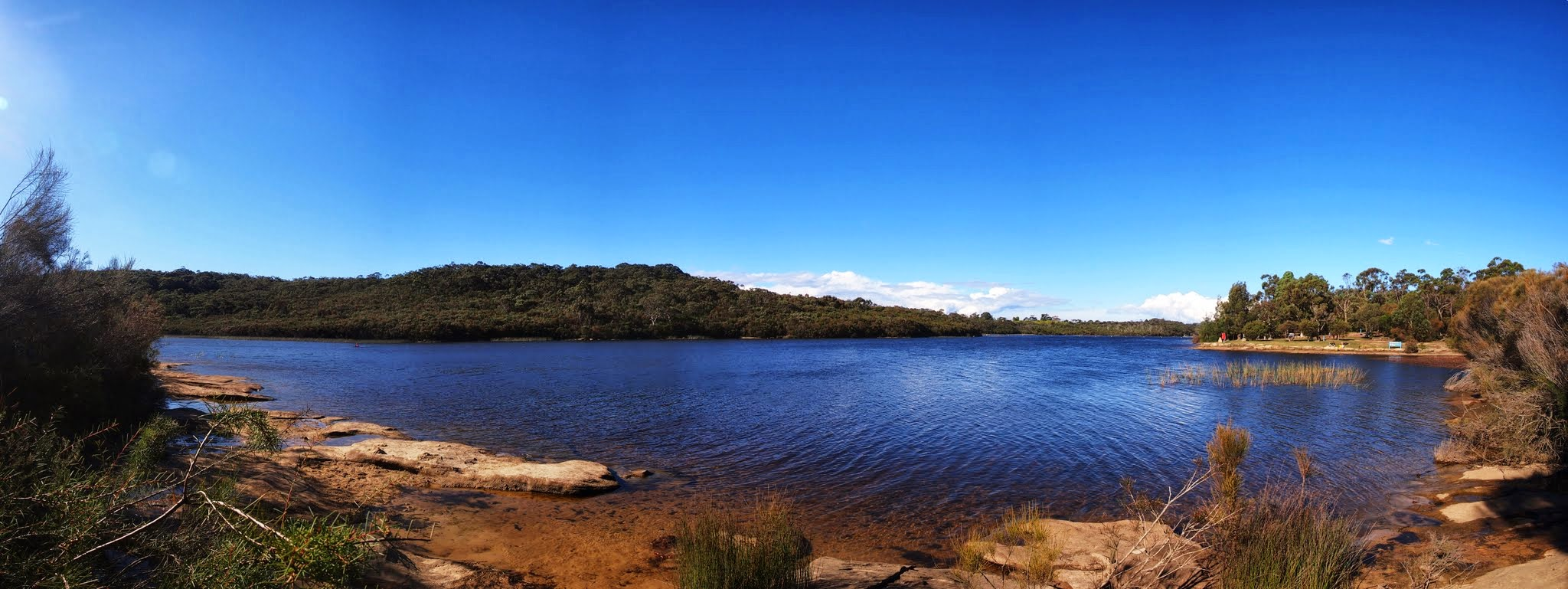
- Manly Dam

- Interactive map of Allambie Heights
- Country: Australia
- State: New South Wales
- City: Sydney
- LGA: Northern Beaches Council
- Location: 18 km (11 mi) north-east of Sydney CBD

Government
  - State electorate: Wakehurst
  - Federal division: Warringah
- Elevation: 118 m (387 ft)

Population
  - Total: 7,317 (2021 census)
- Postcode: 2100
Suburbs around Allambie Heights
Forestville	Frenchs Forest	Beacon Hill Brookvale
Killarney Heights	Allambie Heights	North Manly
Seaforth	North Balgowlah	Manly Vale

Allambie Heights is a suburb on the Northern Beaches of Sydney, 17.5 kilometres north-east of the Sydney central business district.

== History ==
Allambie is an Aboriginal word that means "peaceful place". An estate by that name was subdivided and auctioned in 1918. It is likely that a "goat track" that roughly follows the existing Allambie Road today was used by the Aboriginal people to access the ocean beaches at nearby Manly. The suburb was developed in the late 1940s and early 1950s. Allambie Heights Post Office opened on 1 February 1961.

Many of the streets in Allambie Heights are named after notable battles (particularly where Australian Troops served), and prominent allied political leaders of World War II. These include Moresby Place, Owen Stanley Avenue, Wewak Place, Kirra Road, Libya Crescent, Derna Crescent, Tobruk Avenue, Anzio Avenue, Roosevelt Avenue and Churchill Crescent. Darmour Ave is probably named after the Battle of Damour and simply a misspelling.

== Demographics ==
According to the 2021 census of Population, there were 7,317 residents in Allambie Heights. 70.2% of people were born in Australia. The most common countries of birth were England 8.0%, New Zealand 1.9%, Italy 1.7% and China 1.5%. 84.8% of people only spoke English at home. Other languages spoken at home included Italian 1.7% and Mandarin 1.4%. The most common responses for religious affiliation were No Religion 41.5%, Catholic 26.0%, and Anglican 15.1%.

== Commercial area ==
The main business area in Allambie Heights is located next to the local community centre and the local primary school. The suburb is also home to a range of retirement villages including Scalabrini Village, Fred Hutley Village and The Allambie Heights Village. There are also a number of care centres for the disabled including Sunnyfield Disability Services, The Cerebral Palsy Alliance and The Beach School.

== Education ==
Allambie Heights is home to three schools:

- Allambie Heights Public School
- Arranounbai School
- The Beach School

== Parks ==
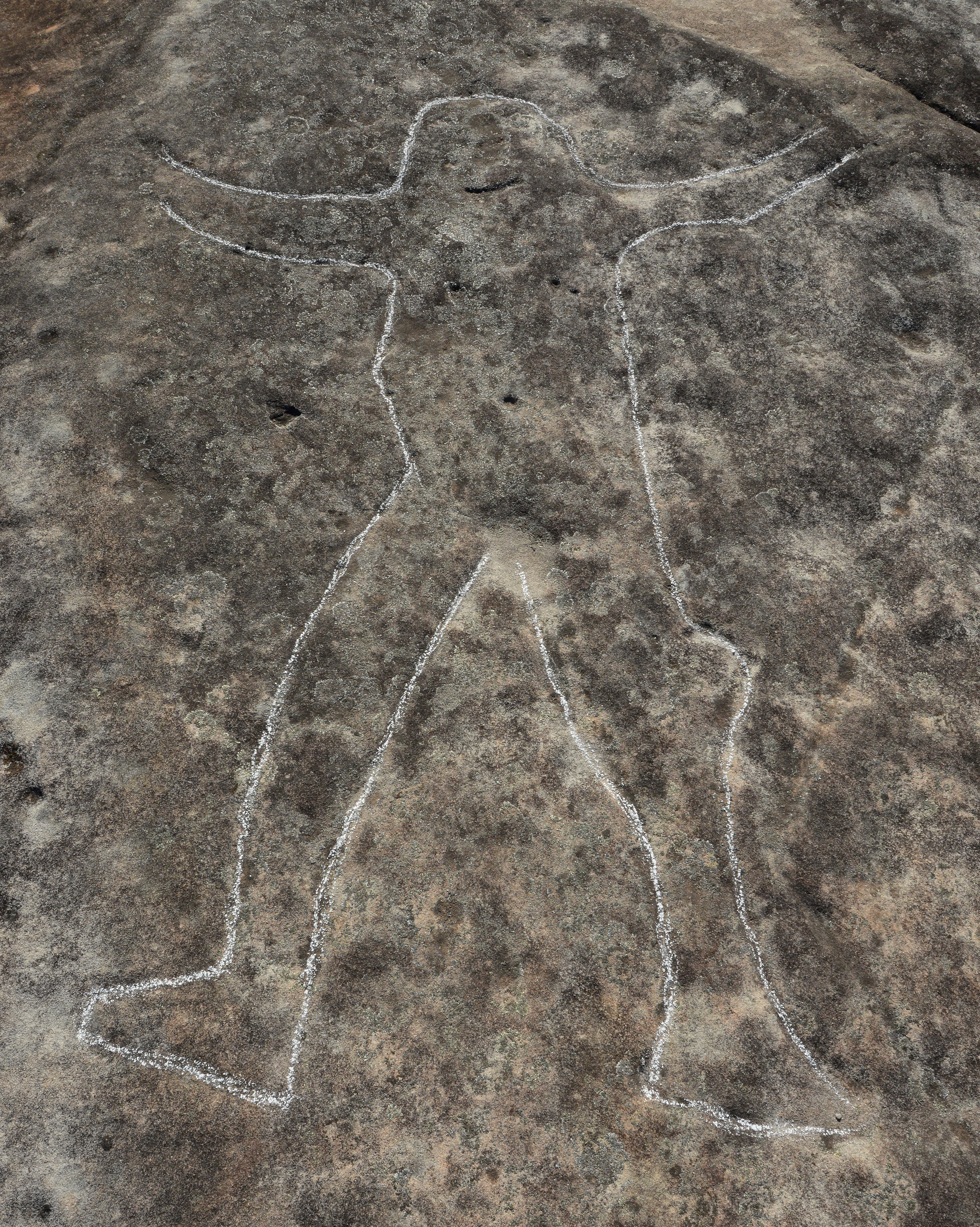
Aboriginal rock carving in Gumbooya Reserve

Allambie Heights is bordered to the south by Manly Dam Reserve (also known as War Memorial Reserve), which is the habitat for a number of species of plants and animals. The area is also home to a number of Australian Aboriginal rock carvings, one of the outstanding examples being the group in Gumbooya Reserve. Garigal National Park sits on the western border.

To the north, Allambie Heights is bordered by Allenby Park, which includes small patches of rainforest and is bisected by small creeks and waterfalls. Bushfires have destroyed much of the bushland area in recent years, however this is part of the Australian ecology cycle and the forests regenerate fairly quickly.
