= Manly Vale =

- Suburb
- Interactive map of Manly Vale
- Country: Australia
- State: New South Wales
- City: Sydney
- LGA: Northern Beaches Council
- Location: 17 km (11 mi) north-east of Sydney CBD

Government
  - State electorate: Manly
  - Federal division: Warringah
- Elevation: 13 m (43 ft)

Population
  - Total: 6,389 (2021 census)
- Postcode: 2093
Suburbs around Manly Vale
North Manly	North Manly	Queenscliff
Allambie Heights	Manly Vale	Manly
North Balgowlah	Balgowlah	Fairlight

Manly Vale is a suburb of northern Sydney, in the state of New South Wales, Australia 17 kilometres north-east of the Sydney central business district in the local government area of Northern Beaches Council, in the Northern Beaches region.

Manly Vale is predominantly a residential suburb with commercial land use on Condamine Street, containing small patches of light industrial. It also contains multiple Retirement Villages and Aged Care facilities.

== History ==
Manly Vale Post Office opened on 3 April 1950 and closed in 1994.

== Heritage listings ==
Manly Vale has 1 heritage-listed site:

- near King Street: Manly Dam

== Population ==
In the 2021 Census, there were 6,389 people in Manly Vale. 60.7% of people were born in Australia. The most common countries of birth were England 8.4%, New Zealand 2.4%, China 2.1%, Brazil 1.7% and South Africa 1.5%. 74.5% of people only spoke English at home. Other languages spoken at home included Mandarin 2.4%, Spanish 1.9%, Portuguese 1.8%, Italian 1.5% and Japanese 0.9%. The most common responses for religion were No Religion 47.6%, Catholic 21.1% and Anglican 10.7%.

== Parks and recreation ==
The suburb contains many recreational facilities including parks such as Passmore Reserve and playing fields at Millers Reserve and David Thomas Reserve. Manly Dam is on the western edge of Manly Vale. There are also a number of small reserves, for example King Street Reserve. Manly Vale FC (soccer) are based at David Thomas Reserve.

== Landcare activities ==
Landcare activities became important in Manly Vale with the creation of the "Return of the Mermaids" Project. The project consists of regularly involving volunteers to collect rubbish, remove weeds and plant local native species in the Mermaid Pool on Manly Creek.

The Pool was originally an intact sandy beach with a sparkling waterfall. It became polluted due to illegal dumping and urban development. Invasive and noxious weeds started to take over the area.

This project was convened under the auspices of the Save Manly Dam Catchment Committee. The SMDCC was established to fight a controversial development in the head waters of Manly Dam by British Motorway constructor Wimpey in conjunction with local firm, Ardel. When bushland was lost to this housing development, the Mermaid Pool Project was initiated to compensate for the destruction.

The "Return of the Mermaids" project aims at rehabilitating the Mermaid Pool as much as possible to its pristine state. The project won the People's Choice Award for the 2011 NSW Landcare Awards. It was also a winner of the 2011 SMCMA Community Group Environment Award.

== Schools ==
The suburb contains three schools, Manly Vale Public School, St Kieran's Primary School and Mackellar Girls Campus, as well as a child care centre operated by the Child Care Group.

== Avenue of Honour ==
King St, Manly Vale has been planted with endemic native trees and shrubs by the local community under the direction of the Save Manly Dam Catchment Committee. The avenue, leading to the entrance of Manly Warringah War Memorial Park, pays tribute to the service of Merchant Seamen in Worlds War 1 and World War 2. It has been officially declared an "Avenue of Honour". A stone memorial has additionally been placed in King Reserve.

== Notable residents ==
- Jack Vidgen, a teenage singer and season 5 winner of Australia's Got Talent.
- Katherine Deves, Liberal Party candidate for Warringah and lawyer.
- Doris Fish, drag queen, artist, actor and writer who wrote and starred in the cult movie classic Vegas in Space.
