= Beacon Hill, New South Wales =

Beacon Hill
- Suburb
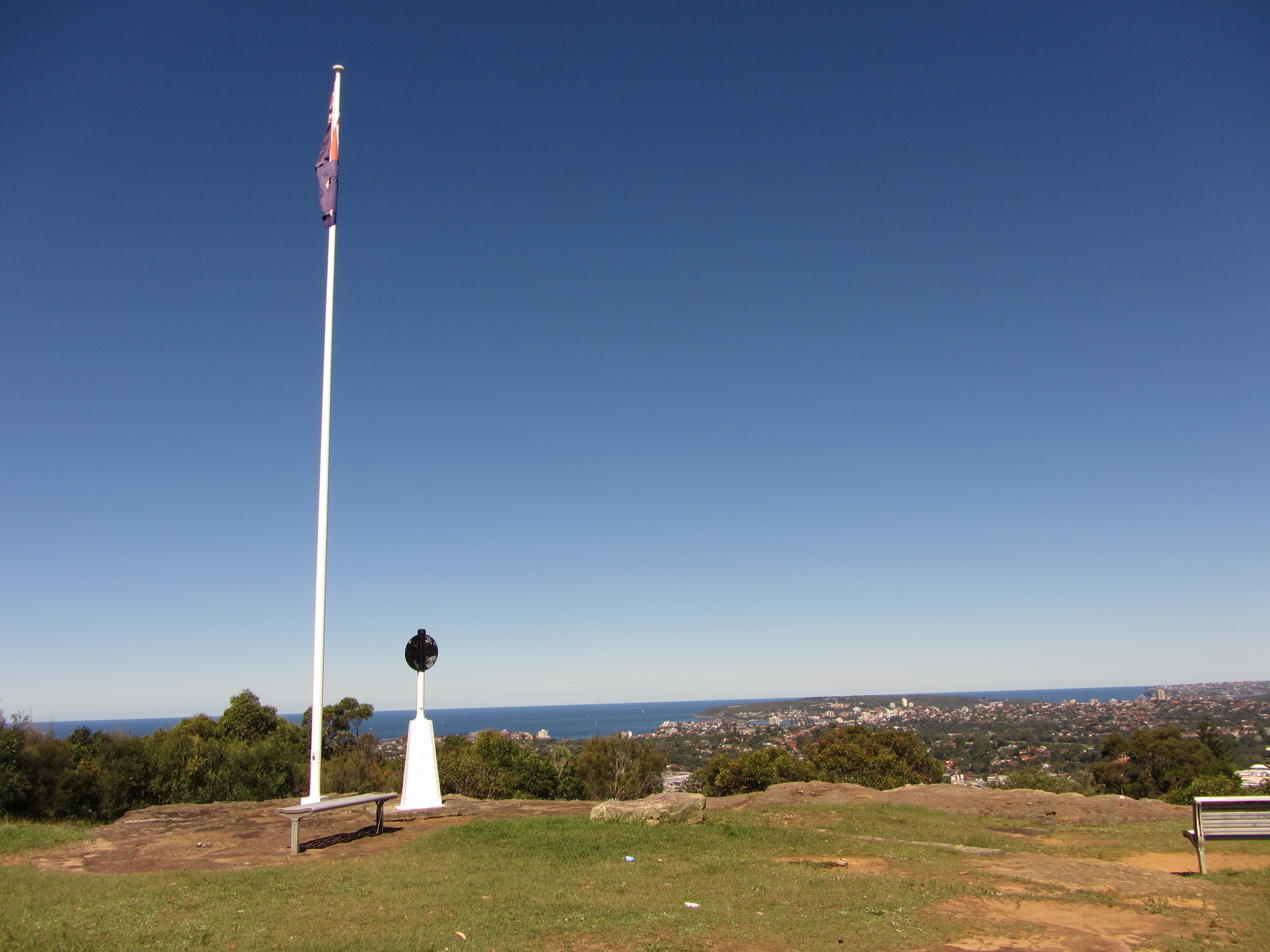
- The outlook from the summit of Governor Phillip Lookout

- Interactive map of Beacon Hill
- Country: Australia
- State: New South Wales
- City: Sydney
- LGA: Northern Beaches Council
- Location: 17 km (11 mi) north-east of Sydney CBD

Government
  - State electorate: Wakehurst
  - Federal divisions: Mackellar; Warringah
- Elevation: 123 m (404 ft)

Population
  - Total: 7,814 (2021 census)
- Postcode: 2100
Suburbs around Beacon Hill
Oxford Falls	Oxford Falls	Cromer
Frenchs Forest	Beacon Hill	Narraweena
Allambie Heights	Allambie Heights	Brookvale

Beacon Hill is a suburb of northern Sydney, in the state of New South Wales, Australia 17 kilometres north-east of the Sydney central business district, in the local government area of Northern Beaches Council. It is part of the Northern Beaches region.

== History ==
Beacon Hill was given the title when the Department of Lands built a trigonometric beacon there in 1881.

=== Aboriginal culture ===
Little is known of local aboriginal culture in the Beacon Hill area but other local areas towards the sea have a rich and diverse aboriginal background. There are some aboriginal carvings in rocks to the north of Red Hill.

=== European settlement ===
Daniel Egan, a member of the NSW Parliament, purchased two 40-acre (16 ha) parcels of land on 5 October 1857.

Most of the houses in the suburb were built in the boom days after World War II, in the 1950s and 1960s. Many of the streets in Beacon Hill are named after notable battles, military men or places where Australian troops served in World War II. These include Owen Stanley Avenue, Kokoda Crescent, Goroka Place and Lae Place.

Beacon Hill Post Office opened on 1 August 1949 and closed in 1986. Beacon Hill High School was established in 1964 and closed in 2002.

== Demographics ==
According to the 2021 census, there were 7,814 people in Beacon Hill. 68.2% of people were born in Australia. The most common countries of birth were England 5.5%, China 2.6%, Italy 2.3% and New Zealand 2.0%. 77.1% of people only spoke English at home. Other languages spoken at home included Italian 3.2%, Mandarin 2.4% and Cantonese 1.3%. The most common responses for religious affiliation were No Religion 36.4%, Catholic 29.3% and Anglican 13.3%.

== Transport ==
Beacon Hill is serviced by Keolis Northern Beaches bus services. Warringah Road (A38) runs east/west through the suburb and provides access to Dee Why in the east and Roseville in the west.

== Landmarks ==
=== Governor Phillip Lookout ===
This lookout is located atop Beacon Hill itself. Views of almost the entire eastern half of the Sydney region may be had from the summit which is approximately 152 metres (500 ft) above sea level.

Views extend from the southern outskirts of Sydney, west to the Blue Mountains and north to Gosford and the Central Coast. The skyline of the city is to the south. Ships, pleasure craft and occasional migratory whales can be seen out to sea in the east.

The lookout is popular with locals on New Year's Eve when the firework displays across Sydney Harbour are clearly visible, approximately 11 kilometres (7 mi) to the south.

The lookout may be reached via Warringah Road. There is a small parking area adjacent to the road with stairs leading to a pathway and the summit.

=== Red Hill ===
Red Hill, not to be confused with Beacon Hill, is located at the northern end of the suburb behind the former Beacon Hill High School site. From here there are views across to the Governor Phillip Lookout, and onwards to the city. The views to the north are over the eastern sections of the Garigal National Park, to Cromer and beyond into the suburbs of Elanora, Narrabeen and Ingleside.

The Red Hill Preservation Society attempted to prevent a state government development of Red Hill in the early 1990s.

== Community services and organizations ==
The Governor Phillip Lookout Trust was gazetted on 9 December 1966 and was charged with the responsibility not only of protecting and developing the area as an historical feature of the district, but also for the preservation and propagation of the native flora and fauna that surrounds the lookout. The first meeting took place on 10 April 1966.

On 13 October 2017, Paul Toole, Minister for Lands and Forestry transferred responsibility for the Trust to Northern Beaches Council.

== Notable residents ==
- Angry Anderson – rock singer
- Brian Carlton – radio announcer
- Ivan Cleary – rugby league coach
- Gerry Duggan – actor
- Bill Leak – cartoonist
- Freddy Lussick – rugby league player
