= Northern Beaches =

Region of Sydney, New South Wales, Australia

Coordinates: 33.609°S 151.328°E

- Region
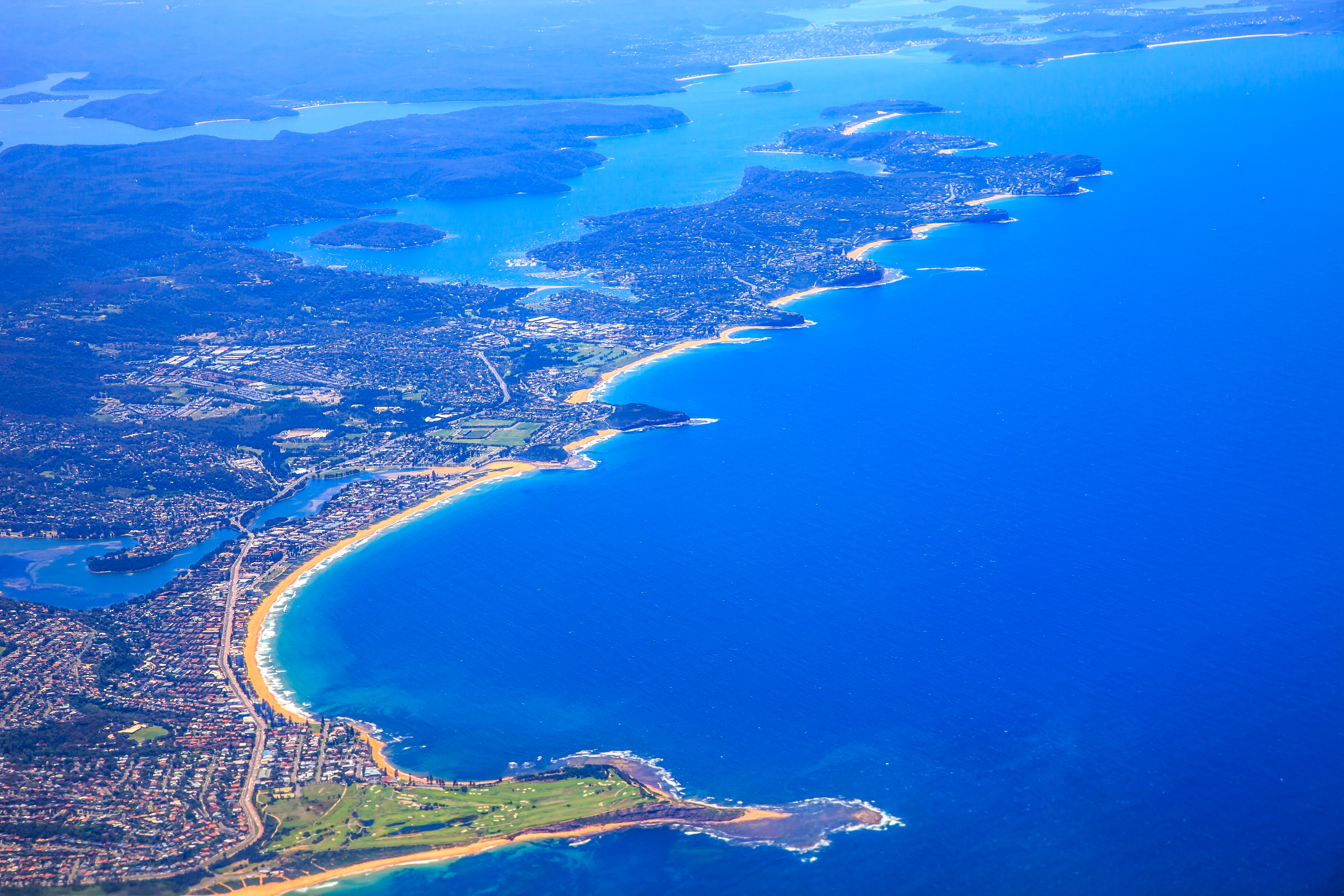
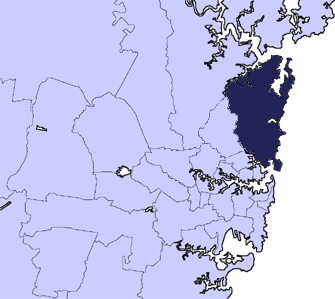
- Long Reef (bottom), to Palm Beach, the northern half of Sydney's Northern Beaches Map of Northern Beaches region
- Country: Australia
- State: New South Wales
- LGA: Northern Beaches Council

Government
  - State electorates: Davidson; Manly; Pittwater; Wakehurst
  - Federal divisions: Mackellar; Warringah

Population
  - Total: 263,554 (2021 census)
Regions around Northern Beaches
Central Coast	Central Coast	Tasman Sea
Forest District Northern Sydney	Northern Beaches	Tasman Sea
North Shore	North Shore	Tasman Sea

The Northern Beaches is a region within Northern Sydney, in the state of New South Wales, Australia, near the Pacific coast. This area extends south to the entrance of Port Jackson (Sydney Harbour), west to Middle Harbour and north to the entrance of Broken Bay. The area was formerly inhabited by the Garigal or Caregal people in a region known as Guringai country.

The Northern Beaches district is governed on a local level by the Northern Beaches Council, which was formed in May 2016 from Warringah Council (est. 1906), Manly Council (est. 1877), and Pittwater Council (est. 1992).

== History ==
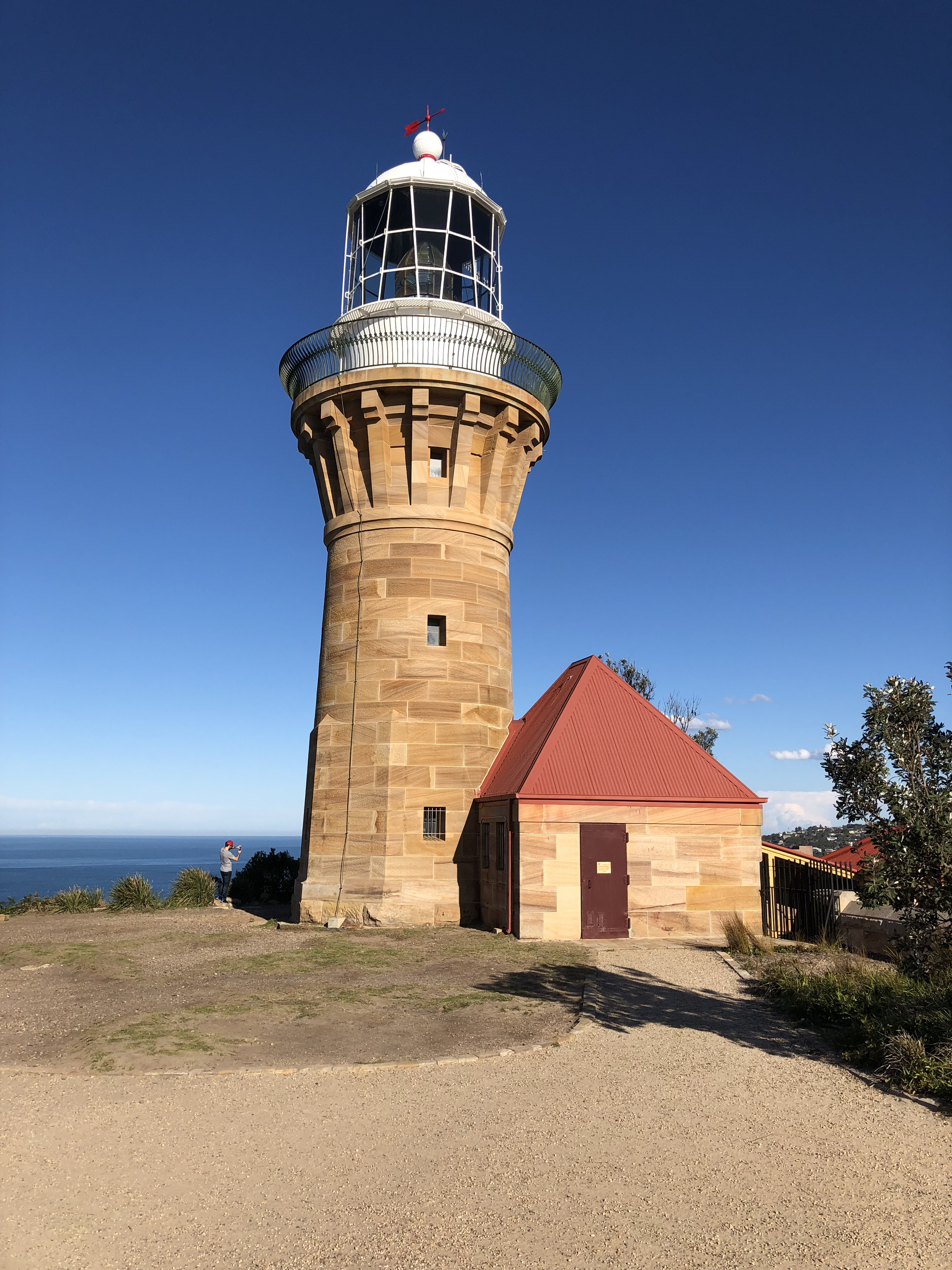
Barrenjoey Head Lighthouse, Palm Beach, New South Wales, Australia

The traditional Aboriginal inhabitants of the land now known as the Northern Beaches were the Garigal people of the Eora nation. Within a few years of European settlement, the Garigal had mostly disappeared from this area mainly due to an outbreak of smallpox in 1789. Much evidence of their habitation remains especially their rock etchings in Ku-ring-gai Chase National Park which borders northern beaches's north-western side. The northern beaches region was explored early on in the settlement of Sydney, only a few weeks after the arrival of the First Fleet. However, it remained a rural area for most of the 19th and early 20th centuries, with only small settlements in the valleys between headlands. While it was geographically close to the city centre, to reach the area over land from Sydney via Mona Vale Road was a trip of more than 100 kilometres (62 mi).

Since those days, urban growth proceeded slowly until the 1960s when development accelerated because of improved roads and a general increase in living standards in the regions.

In 1906, the Warringah Shire council was formed the NSW Government Gazette, along with 132 other new Shires within New South Wales. It ran roughly from Broken Bay in the north to Manly Lagoon to the south, and by Middle Harbour Creek and Cowan Creek in the west. Pittwater was incorporated as the "A Riding" of Warringah Shire, however for many years there existed a sentiment held by some in A Riding, the northern Riding and the largest in Warringah, taking up more than 40% of Warringah's land area, that they were being increasingly ignored and subject to what they considered inappropriate development and policies for their area. This culminated in 1991 when a non-compulsory postal poll of the residents of A Riding was taken over the question of a possible secession. This resulted in a 73.5% vote in favour of secession, however only 48.18% of residents took part in this vote. This vote was, however, 600 short of the total majority required. Over time, the Northern Beaches was often divided by the "Lower Northern Beaches", referring to the southern end of the region, and the "Upper Northern Beaches", referring to the northern end of the region (North Narrabeen to Palm Beach).

In 2016, the Local Government (Council Amalgamations) Proclamation 2016 insisted that the Northern Beaches region councils of Manly, Warringah and Pittwater become the Northern Beaches Council. This was effective from 12 May 2016.

Today, the Northern Beaches is very well part of the Sydney metropolis, however maintains an isolated environment from the other regions of Sydney including the neighbouring North Shore region. The "Forest District" became an unofficial district within the Northern Beaches region to describe the suburbs between Ingleside and the Upper North Shore.

== Suburbs and localities ==
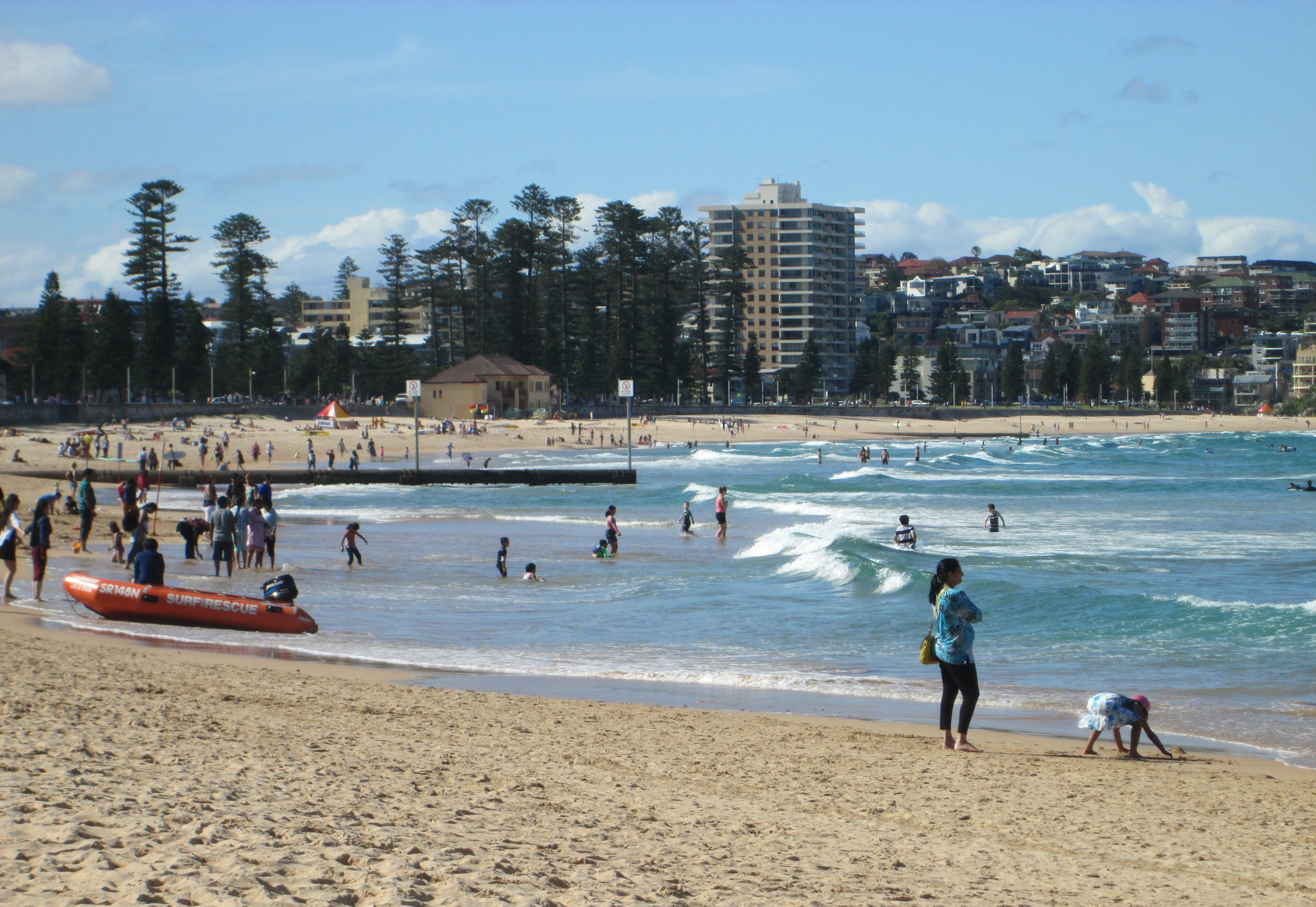
Manly beach

Suburbs

The suburbs of the Northern Beaches district are:

- Allambie Heights
- Avalon Beach
- Balgowlah Heights
- Balgowlah
- Bayview
- Beacon Hill
- Belrose
- Bilgola Beach
- Bilgola Plateau
- Brookvale
- Church Point
- Clareville
- Clontarf
- Coasters Retreat
- Collaroy Plateau
- Collaroy
- Cottage Point
- Cromer
- Curl Curl
- Davidson
- Dee Why
- Duffys Forest
- Elanora Heights
- Elvina Bay
- Fairlight
- Forestville
- Frenchs Forest
- Freshwater
- Great Mackerel Beach
- Ingleside
- Killarney Heights
- Lovett Bay
- Manly Vale
- Manly
- Mona Vale
- Morning Bay
- Narrabeen
- Narraweena
- Newport
- North Balgowlah
- North Curl Curl
- North Manly
- North Narrabeen
- Oxford Falls
- Palm Beach
- Queenscliff
- Scotland Island
- Seaforth
- Terrey Hills
- Warriewood
- Whale Beach
- Wheeler Heights

Localities

The localities of the Northern Beaches district are:

- Bantry Bay
- Careel Bay
- Wingala

== Schools ==
The following primary, high and K–12 schools are located on the Northern Beaches:

Primary

- AGBU Alexander Primary School
- Allambie Heights Public School
- Avalon Public School
- Balgowlah North Public School
- Balgowlah Heights Public School
- Beacon Hill Public School
- Belrose Public School
- Bilgola Plateau Public School
- Collaroy Plateau Public School
- Cromer Public School
- Curl Curl North Public School
- Dee Why Public School
- Elanora Heights Public School
- Farmhouse Montessori Primary School
- Forestville Montessori School
- Forestville Public School
- Frenchs Forest Public School
- Harbord Public School
- John Colet School
- Kamaroi Rudolf Steiner School
- Kambora Public School
- Killarney Heights Public School
- Kinma School
- Manly Village Public School
- Manly Vale Public School
- Manly West Public School
- Maria Regina Catholic Primary School
- Mimosa Public School
- Mona Vale Public School
- Narrabeen Lakes Public School
- Narrabeen North Public School
- Narraweena Public School
- Newport Public School
- Our Lady of Good Counsel Catholic Primary School
- Sacred Heart Catholic Primary School
- Seaforth Public School
- St Cecilia's Catholic Primary School
- St John's Catholic Primary School
- St John The Baptist Catholic Primary School
- St Joseph's Catholic Primary School
- St Kevin's Catholic Primary School
- St Kieran's Catholic Primary School
- St Luke's Grammar School (Bayview Campus)
- St Martin De Porres Catholic Primary School
- St Rose Catholic Primary School
- Terrey Hills Public School
- Wakehurst Public School
- Wheeler Heights Public School
- Yanginanook School

High

- Barrenjoey High School
- Balgowlah Boys Campus
- Cromer Campus
- Davidson High School
- Forest High School
- Freshwater Senior Campus
- Killarney Heights High School
- Mackellar Girls Campus
- Manly Selective Campus
- Mater Maria Catholic College
- Narrabeen Sports High School
- Pittwater High School
- Stella Maris College
- St Augustine's College (Years 5 to 12)
- St Paul's Catholic College

K–12

- Covenant Christian School
- Fisher Road School
- Galstaun College
- Northern Beaches Christian School
- Oxford Falls Grammar School
- The Pittwater House Schools
- St Luke's Grammar School (Dee Why Campus)

International Schools

- German International School Sydney
- Sydney Japanese International School

Closed schools

- Beacon Hill High School
- Forestville Montessori High School
- Oxford Falls Public School

== Transport ==
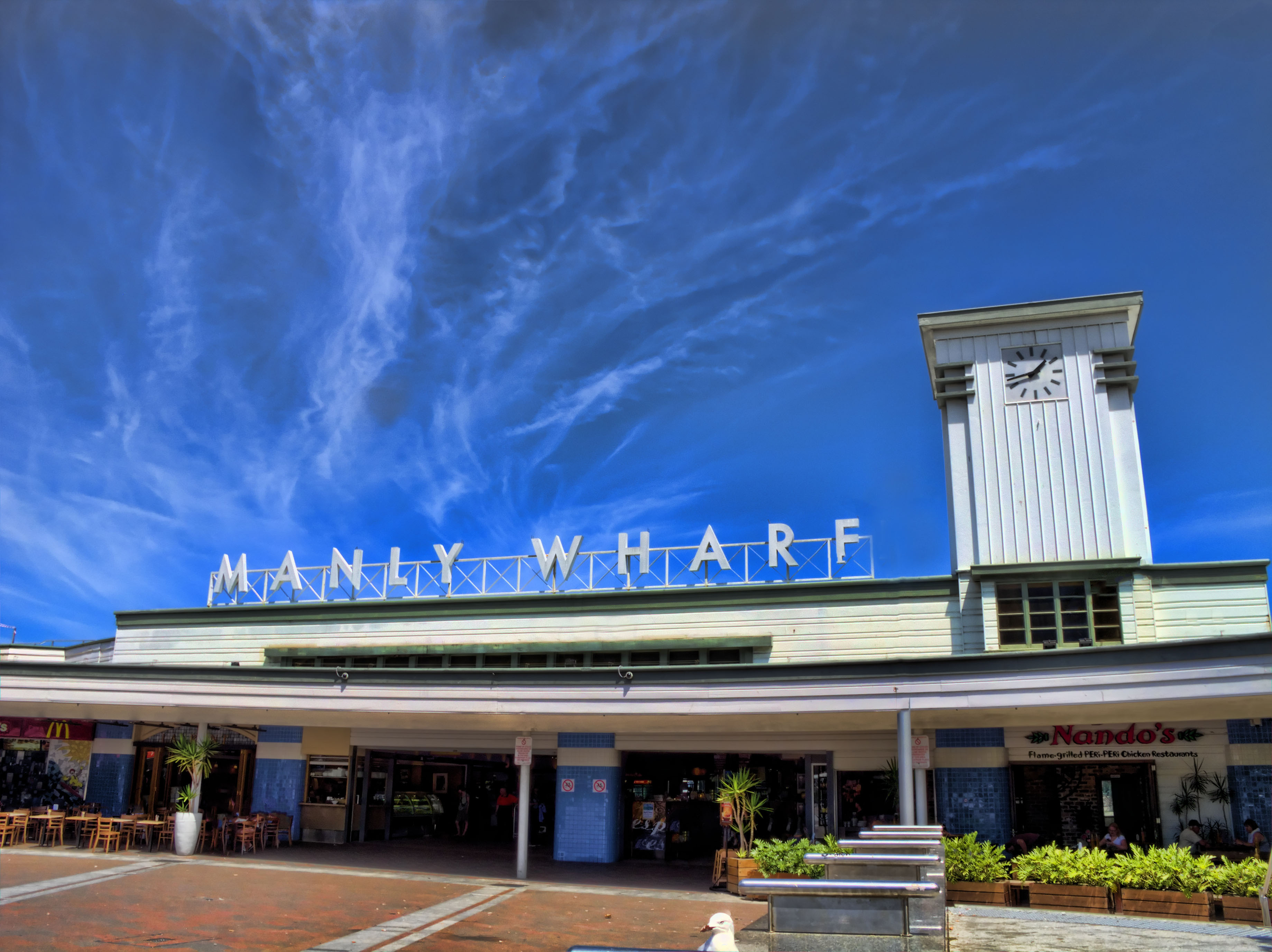
Manly ferry wharf

Public transport in the Northern Beaches is primarily provided by buses. Major bus interchanges are at Pittwater Road at Brookvale, Dee Why, Mona Vale and Manly Wharf. Buses connect to Gordon, Chatswood and North Sydney stations on the North Shore line, served by Sydney Trains North Shore & Western and Northern services, as well as stations in the CBD.

B-Line buses travel from Mona Vale to Wynyard, stopping at Warriewood, Narrabeen, Collaroy, Dee Why, Brookvale, Manly Vale, Spit Junction and Neutral Bay.

Manly ferry services operated by Sydney Ferries run from Manly to Circular Quay. The privately operated Manly Fast Ferry also runs to Circular Quay.

Palm Beach Water Airport is located in Palm Beach.

=== Northern Beaches Network Review ===
In 2026, the Northern Beaches Network Review was released. It was a major review of road corridors for the area.

== Arts and Culture ==
The Northern Beaches has a public library system, Northern Beaches Libraries and the Manly Art Gallery and Museum.

== Sports ==
Notable sports teams include the Manly-Warringah Sea Eagles (rugby league), North Harbour Rays, Manly RUFC, Warringah Rugby Club (rugby union), Manly Warringah District Cricket Club (cricket) and Manly United FC (soccer). The Sea Eagles play in the National Rugby League, and play their home games at Brookvale Oval.

== See also ==
- Manly Beach
- Curl Curl Beach
- Barrenjoey
- Palm Beach
- McKay Reserve
