= North Manly, New South Wales =

North Manly
- Suburb
- Interactive map of North Manly
- Country: Australia
- State: New South Wales
- City: Sydney
- LGA: Northern Beaches Council
- Location: 17 km (11 mi) north-east of Sydney CBD

Government
  - State electorate: Manly
  - Federal division: Warringah
- Elevation: 8 m (26 ft)

Population
  - Total: 3,396 (2021 census)
- Postcode: 2100
Suburbs around North Manly
Brookvale	Brookvale	North Curl Curl
Allambie Heights	North Manly	Freshwater Queenscliff
North Balgowlah	Manly Vale	Manly

North Manly is a suburb of northern Sydney, in the state of New South Wales, Australia 17 kilometres north-east of the Sydney central business district in the local government area of Northern Beaches Council. It is part of the Northern Beaches region.

== History ==
Corrie Road Post Office opened on 1 August 1916, was renamed North Manly in 1926 and closed in 1978.

== Parks ==
Manly District Park, Nolan Reserve, Warringah Golf Course.
