= Queenscliff, New South Wales =

Queenscliff
- Suburb
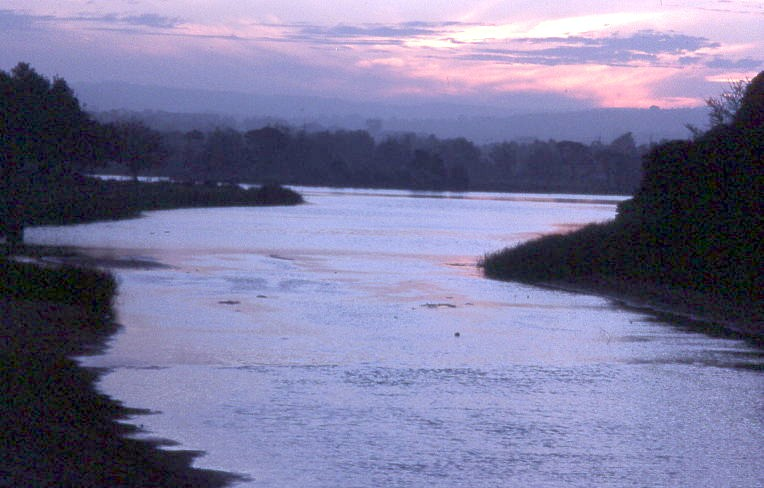
- Manly Lagoon, dusk

- Interactive map of Queenscliff
- Country: Australia
- State: New South Wales
- City: Sydney
- LGA: Northern Beaches Council
- Location: 16 km (9.9 mi) north-east of Sydney CBD

Government
  - State electorate: Manly
  - Federal division: Warringah
- Elevation: 7 m (23 ft)

Population
  - Total: 3,407 (2021 census)
- Postcode: 2096
Suburbs around Queenscliff
North Manly	Freshwater
North Manly	Queenscliff	Tasman Sea
Manly	Manly

Queenscliff is a suburb of northern Sydney, in the state of New South Wales, Australia. Queenscliff is located 16 kilometres north-east of the Sydney central business district, in the local government area of Northern Beaches Council and is part of the Northern Beaches region.

== History ==
Queenscliff was named in honour of Queen Victoria. The area was popular with holiday-makers from the early 1900s to World War I, who stayed in holiday shacks on the headland.

Queenscliff is famous amongst the Australian surf beaches for its "heavy" waves (bomboras) that break out at sea. The stories recounting how Dave Jackman dared to ride one in 1961 gave rise to big wave surfing in Australia.

== Population ==
In the 2021 Census, there were 3,407 people resident in Queenscliff. 58.7% of people were born in Australia. The most common other countries of birth were England 11.2% and New Zealand 2.9%. 80.9% of people only spoke English at home. The most common responses for religion were No Religion 56.0%, Catholic 20.1%, and Anglican 9.8%.

== Geography ==
Queenscliff Beach is situated at the northern end of a long stretch of beach at Manly that includes North Steyne Beach and Manly Beach.

Manly Lagoon was originally called Curl Curl Lagoon and the name Curl Curl appears to be the original Aboriginal name for the Queenscliff and Manly Vale area. Manly Creek was originally Curl Curl Creek and Queenscliff Headland was originally Curl Curl Headland.

== Aboriginal People ==
Pittwater and the Northern Beaches area was formerly known as Guringai country, the land of the Garigal or Caregal people. The Aboriginal Heritage Office issued a report in 2015 titled “Filling a void. A Review of the Historical context for the use of the word ‘Guringai’. The report states “It is unfortunate that the term Guringai has become widely known in northern Sydney and it is understandable that people wish to use it as it is convenient to have a single word to cover the language, tribe/nation, identity and culture of a region. However, it is based on a nineteenth century fiction and the AHO would argue that the use of the term Guringai or any of its various spellings such as Kuringai is not warranted given its origin and previous use.” In reference to the clan name Garigal or Caregal the report goes on to say “In the absence of a convenient single term for the whole of northern Sydney, the AHO would recommend the use of clan names for local areas, with the understanding that these too have their limitations and problems, and the acceptance of the truth of the lack of certainty as a feature of how Aboriginal history and heritage is portrayed here.”
