= Forestville, New South Wales =

Forestville
- Suburb
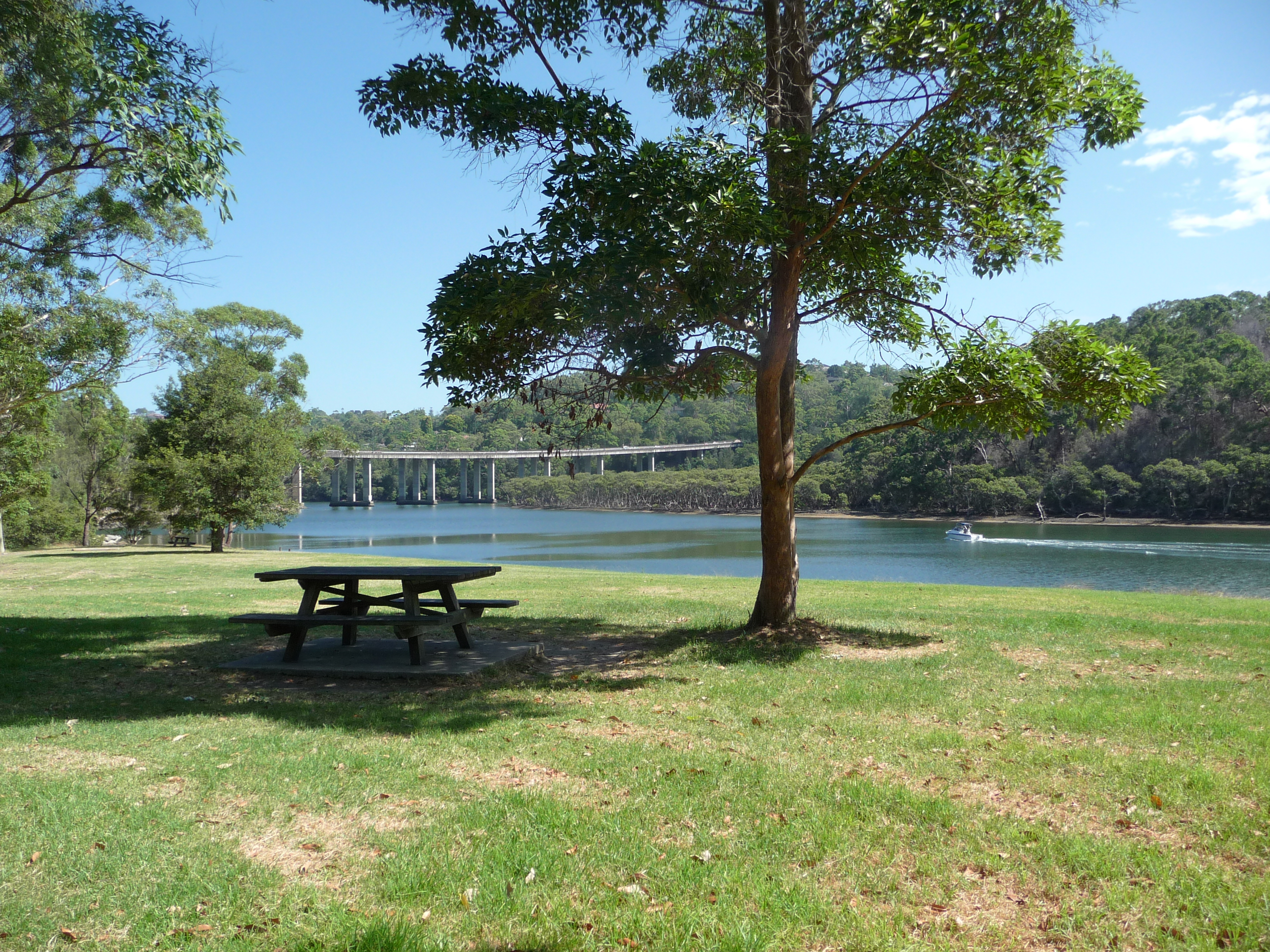
- Davidson Park

- Interactive map of Forestville
- Country: Australia
- State: New South Wales
- City: Sydney
- LGA: Northern Beaches Council
- Location: 12 km (7.5 mi) north-east of Sydney CBD
- Established: 1856

Government
  - State electorate: Wakehurst
  - Federal division: Mackellar
- Elevation: 127 m (417 ft)

Population
  - Total: 8,659 (2021 census)
- Postcode: 2087
Suburbs around Forestville
East Killara	Davidson Belrose	Frenchs Forest
East Lindfield	Forestville	Frenchs Forest
Roseville Chase	Killarney Heights	Allambie Heights

Forestville is a suburb of Northern Sydney, in the state of New South Wales, Australia. Forestville is 12 kilometres north of the Sydney central business district in the local government area of Northern Beaches Council. Forestville is part of the Forest District.

== Location ==
Forestville's location is at a junction between Sydney's North Shore and Northern Beaches and is often considered to be part of both, with Middle Harbour forming the boundary of this distinction. The suburb is bound to the east and west by bushland of the Garigal National Park and to the south by Middle Harbour.

Flora and fauna thrive in Garigal National Park and nearby Davidson National Park, with the area, along with Frenchs Forest, Belrose and Terrey Hills, receiving some of the highest rainfall in Sydney.

== History ==
Forestville means town in the forest. This area was originally thick wooded forest until James French settled here and began felling timber in 1856 and eventually built a small wharf on Bantry Bay to ship timber to Sydney. French later acquired more land in the adjacent suburb which bears his name, Frenchs Forest. The area was used for so called "soldier settlement" farms after the 1st world war with very mixed success. Much of the land, particularly toward Killarney Heights was totally unsuitable for any type of farming and was developed as housing land in the early 1960s.

French's Forest Settlement Post Office opened in 1920 and was renamed Forestville in 1947.

== Commercial areas ==
Forestville Village Shops – or The Centre – is the suburb's main shopping centre located on Darley and Starkey Streets with a Coles supermarket and a variety of specialty shops, services and food options.

A few shops are located along Arthur Street, including a cafe, physiotherapist and chiropractor.

Forestville is also formerly the home to the office and call centre of the NSW Wildlife Information and Rescue Service (WIRES), which has since relocated to nearby Brookvale. Cook Street is also home to many DIY shops such as a Mitre 10 (also known by its original name "Eatons") and multiple car service centres and other industries.

== Housing ==
Dotted with many parks and reserves and almost completely surrounded by bushland with much native flora and fauna, Forestville is a low density housing area consisting of mostly family homes with medium-sized backyards. The housing style is mixed.

Many of the timber Soldiers Cottages that were originally built in the 1950s and early 1960s have gradually been replaced by large project homes and smaller townhouse villas. However, there is increasingly a trend towards renovating and preserving the original cottages or building architect-designed houses which sit well in the bushland setting. It's this organic approach to housing development by Warringah council and the wider Forestville community that has allowed Forestville and the surrounding neighbourhoods like Killarney Heights and Frenchs Forest to grow and expand yet still maintain their unique bushland identity and local character.

== Schools ==
There are three primary schools in Forestville, Our Lady of Good Counsel, Forestville Montessori School and Forestville Public School. The nearest high school is Killarney Heights High School and other high schools nearby are The Forest High School in Allambie Heights and Davidson High School in Frenchs Forest. There is also the Aspect Vern Barnett School for children with autism spectrum disorder.

== Churches ==
There are a number of churches in Forestville:

- St David's Anglican Church
- Cityview Church
- Forestville Uniting Church
- Our Lady of Good Counsel Catholic Church
- Rest Church
- Ruach Ministries (a network of house churches)

== Sport and recreation ==
Sporting facilities in Forestville include sporting fields, tennis and netball courts which local teams such as Forest Killarney Soccer Club, Forest Netball Club, Forest Rugby Club and the Forestville Ferrets Junior Rugby League Football Club call home ground. There is a Returned Services League Centre (RSL) nearby called The Forest Club.

== Population ==
At the 2021 census, there were 8,659 residents in Forestville. The median age of 43 was higher than the national median of 38, and 20.4% of the population were aged 65 years and over. The most common ancestries in Forestville were English 34.8%, Australian 29.9%, Irish 10.2%, Scottish 9.0% and Chinese 8.8%.

64.3% of people were born in Australia. The most common countries of birth were England 5.3%, China 3.0%, New Zealand 2.0%, Hong Kong 1.5% and South Africa 1.5%. 71.7% of people only spoke English at home. Other languages spoken at home included Armenian 3.6%, Cantonese 3.2%, Mandarin 2.8%, French 2.2% and Japanese 1.6%. The most common responses for religion in Forestville were No Religion 38.5%, Catholic 21.7% and Anglican 13.5%.

== Politics ==
Following a redistribution in December 2009, Forestville residents may be allocated to one of two Federal electorates. This could be either the Division of Warringah or the Division of Mackellar. Forestville is home to the former Federal MP for Warringah, and former Prime Minister Tony Abbott.

== Transport ==
Warringah Road is the main thoroughfare that connects Forestville to the adjacent suburbs of Roseville Chase and Frenchs Forest. Two different bus companies operate in Forestville. CDC NSW operates numerous routes through the suburb, with routes connecting Forestville to the Sydney CBD, Chatswood (many services terminate at the Chatswood Interchange, providing straight forward connections via train and metro services to Sydney and other destinations) plus Belrose and Terrey Hills as well as a Loop Service connecting Forestville Village Shops with Killarney Heights. Keolis Northern Beaches operates two bus routes, which runs from Chatswood to Dee Why or Westfield Warringah Mall and passes through Forestville.
