= Wakehurst Public School =

Location
- Belrose, New South Wales; Australia; 33°44′18.97″S 151°13′5.14″E

Information
- Type: Public, primary, co-educational, day school
- Motto: Friendship, Loyalty and Learning.
- Established: 1966
- Principal: Caroline Desmond
- Enrolment: ~400 (K–6)
- Campus: Glen Street
- Colours: Royal blue, sky blue and gold
- Website: Wakehurst Public School

Wakehurst Public School is a public co-educational primary school located in Belrose, Sydney, Australia. The school draws its students predominantly from the surrounding suburbs of Belrose, Davidson and Frenchs Forest. The school has approximately 400 enrolled pupils from Kindergarten to Year 6.

== History ==
Owing to the large growth in the Belrose and Frenchs Forest regions during the 1950s and 60s, in 1963 the decision was taken by the Minister for Education, The Hon. Ernest Wetherell, to have a third primary school built in the Forest district. At the time, the existing schools were deemed to be insufficient: Frenchs Forest Public School (1916) was at capacity with 1000 students and 29 rooms and Belrose Public School (1952) was too small and undeveloped with only 67 students and 3 rooms. For these reasons the decision was taken to build a new school on Glen Street.

The school was opened as Belrose South Public School in January 1966 but was later renamed as Wakehurst Public School in July 1966. It was named after Lord Wakehurst, who was a popular Governor of New South Wales between 1937 and 1946.

=== The fire ===
On Thursday 20 November 1980 at approximately 10:20pm a fire broke out in the School library. The fire completely destroyed the building along with almost all of its contents, including over 8000 books and a number of school records and historical items. The seat of the fire was under a cabinet in the library office.

The Department of Education gave the school the loan of a demountable classroom to act as a library until the new library was built. The new library was started in 1982 and officially opened on 16 November 1982. Among those present at the opening ceremony were: Paul Couvret (President of Warringah Shire Council), G. Conomy (Assistant Director General of Education), Terry Metherell (State Member for Davidson), C. Knibb, M. Blanch (NSW Inspector of Schools) and the Principal of the day, Neville Trotter.

== Principals ==
Years	Wakehurst Public School
1965−1971	Marjorie Stuart
1972−1974	Len Jack
Jun – Dec 1974	Richard Farrow (Acting)
1975−1977	John Rees
1978−1983	Neville Trotter
1984−1986	Belinda Myors
1986−2005	John Eagleton
Apr – Dec 2005	Anne Moody (Acting)
2006−2015	Wendy Phillips
Jun – Dec 2015	Amber Gorrell (Relieving)
Jan – Oct 2016	Trish Fox (Relieving)
2016−present	Caroline Desmond

== Houses ==
The current house system is named after four of the five early Governors of New South Wales: William Bligh (1806–1808), Lachlan Macquarie (1810–1821), John Hunter (1795–1800) and Arthur Phillip (1788–1792). The Wakehurst houses and their colours are as follows: Hunter (yellow), Bligh (blue), Phillip (green) and Macquarie (red). They then later changed this to Kingfisher(yellow) (Kookaburra) Blue lorikeet (green) and rosella (red)

The annual school swimming carnival is held early in Term 1. The annual athletics carnival is held mid-year at the State Sports Centre at Narrabeen. From these two carnivals, children are selected to represent Wakehurst at Zone level. A squad of long distance runners is also selected each year to represent the school in the Zone Cross-Country Carnival.

Students in Years 3-6 participate in intra-school sports programs as well as participating in the Primary School Sports Association (PSSA) inter-school competitions. Inter-school teams are selected for cricket, softball and T-ball in summer and soccer and netball in winter.

== School grounds ==
The school campus is located along Glen Street. The grounds include five main buildings: two K-2 classroom blocks, one incorporating the School's assembly hall and canteen; a classroom block incorporating the computer room; another Years 3-6 classroom block with the uniform shop at one end; and a main administration block which includes the School's library and audio-visual room.

There is a large playground which includes an oval, cricket nets, two adventure playgrounds, a netball/basketball court, a shaded sandpit, a number of handball courts marked on the asphalt section and a Covered Outdoor Learning Area (COLA) which provides a covered space for sport, social and daily school activities.

The school shares its grounds with two small remnants of the now endangered Duffy's Forest ecological community, where ecologists have identified 87 different plants.

== Notable alumni ==
- Cameron Davis (golfer) Pro PGA Golfer, 3 time winner of the Rocket Classic, he has also won the Nashville Golf Open and the Australian Open (golf)
- Lucas Neill – footballer and former captain of the Australian national team.
- Jim McKay – former assistant coach Wallabies Australian Rugby Union Team, current attack coach Queensland Rugby Union Team, Super Rugby premiers 2011, Australian conference champions 2021. Current head coach Brisbane City. Former consultant coach of Tonga Rugby Union team in Rugby World Cup 2019. former coach of Cornish Pirates UK and Kobelco Steelers Japan.
- Cornelia Rau – German citizen who was unlawfully detained as part of the Australian Government's mandatory detention program.

== See also ==
- List of Government schools in New South Wales
