= Davidson High School (New South Wales) =

Location
- Frenchs Forest, New South Wales; Australia; 33°44′42″S 151°12′18″E

Information
- Type: Public, secondary, co-educational, day school
- Motto: Wisely Sincerely
- Established: 1972
- Principal: David Rule
- Teaching staff: 56.6 FTE (2025)
- Grades: 7-12
- Enrolment: 790 (2025)
- Campus: Mimosa Street
- Colours: Red and navy blue
- Mascot: Davo Moose
- Newspaper: The Davidson Dispatch (term newsletter)
- Website: davidson-h.schools.nsw.gov.au

Davidson High School (DHS) is a school in Frenchs Forest, Sydney, New South Wales, Australia, on Mimosa Street. It is a co-educational high school operated by the New South Wales Department of Education with students from years 7 to 12. The school was established in 1972 as a result of the growing population in the Frenchs Forest and Belrose areas and is located on a site bounded by heritage-listed remnant bushland.

Davidson High has a prominent history of involvement in the performing arts, in Dance, Drama and Music, and annually produces the "Season of Performing Arts" at the local Glen Street Theatre. In 2004 and 2007, Davidson High entered the New South Wales Rock Eisteddfod Competition with pieces relating to the Iraq war. Both performances came under a lot of media scrutiny, with a similar result.

== History ==
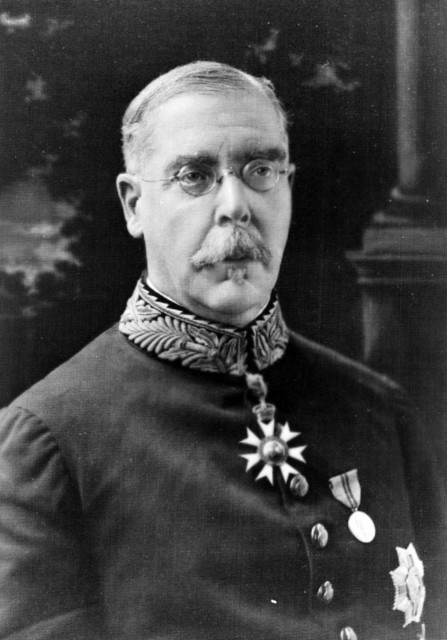
Sir Walter Davidson, Governor of New South Wales, namesake of the suburb and the school.

Davidson High School was originally to be called Sorlie High School after George Sorlie, an idealistic developer of land in the district. However, the residents of the area requested a change of name for the suburb, which was granted. The new suburb, and consequently the new high school, was named after Sir Walter Davidson, a popular Governor of New South Wales from 1918 until his death in 1923, and to whom the parklands of 2,500 acres (10 km^{2}) called Davidson Park were dedicated on 13 October 1923, which now lies within Garigal National Park. This forms the western boundary of Davidson. However, the site of the school lies not in Davidson but on the western edge of Frenchs Forest.

A meeting was called on 12 August 1971 at Wakehurst Public School. Representatives of the teaching staff and P.&C. Associations of Frenchs Forest, Wakehurst, Mimosa, and Belrose Public Schools, were advised by representatives of the Education Department of a proposed new school adjoining the grounds of Mimosa School. This new school would be known as Davidson High, with the anticipated completion date of January 1973. The design of the school, drafted by architects Ian McHutchison, Douglas Anderson and Ronald Powell under the administration of the New South Wales Government Architect Ted Farmer, was termed a "Study 3 School". The design was created to be the 'go-to plan' for the majority of constructions in NSW state schools from 1971. Thus, Davidson High School was one of many created in this Brutalist style in the period, including Evans High School (1971, Blacktown), Mulwaree High School (1971, Goulburn), Galston High School (1972, Galston), Lake Illawarra High School (1972, Lake Illawarra), Kooringal High School (1973, Wagga Wagga), Casula High School (1973, Casula) and Macintyre High School (1974, Inverell).

The design reflected the change in the NSW Education system since the landmark Wyndham Report and the Public Education Act 1961 that emphasised a subject-based structure of students, rather than strictly Form-based. Thus each "Study 3 School" was designed with its classrooms organised around each subject department, requiring pupils, rather than staff, to move between lessons, and allowed specialist facilities for each subject. The Brutalist design of the school was one very consciously chosen by the Government Architect's Branch who in one report noted that the school design was "...the largest and most expansive and in terms of the 'heavy' style of architecture, the most handsome yet evolved." Prominent Sydney architect Russell Jack (of Allen Jack+Cottier), in his evaluation of Davidson High's design, agreed, noting that

The various blocks are well grouped – less formally than the doughnut layouts [of the Form-based school designs] – and they consequently create a more human atmosphere. There are some lapses in scale from that which would seem appropriate for children. For instance, the use of deep window reveals in the brick walls is almost monumental. Generally there is a friendliness apt for its purpose, enhanced by the restrained use of primary colour on columns, balustrades and doors. These elements provide enlivening contrast in the face brickwork and off-form concrete surfaces.

The school's earliest students were housed between Killarney Heights High School and The Forest High School from 1972 to 1973. On 3 September 1971, the "Davidson High School" name was gazetted by the Geographical Names Board, and the formal establishment of the school was announced by the Minister for Education, Eric Willis, on 19 January 1973. In early 1973, Year 7 classes were situated in Mimosa Public School and Year 8 classes at Killarney Heights Public School, requiring students, teachers and parents to travel in between schools. The buildings on the present site were first completed and occupied in September 1973.

The first school badge 1972–1983

Despite the library not being completed until 1976, the school was officially opened in January 1974. The ceremony was attended by the inaugural principal, William Lambert, who said to the students: "...Davidson High is yours, continue the effort that has been made by so many to develop it. Keep building it, with pride and earnest endeavour." Like the neighbouring Mimosa Public School, Davidson High was built on a site bounded by forested native bushland remnants of the Duffys Forest Ecological Community, which was first listed as local heritage item under the Warringah Local Environmental Plan in 2000.

In December 1995, the Head Teacher of Legal Studies, Jan Jones, was awarded the NSW Award at the 1995 National Excellence in Teaching Awards, presented by the Australian Scholarships Foundation. Jones was the Teacher of Legal Studies at Davidson from 1989 until her death in 2000, and the school function room was dedicated as the Jan Jones Room in her memory not long after. Teacher of Music from 1989 to 2014, Helen Oberg, was also awarded the NSW Minister's Award for Excellence in Teaching in 1995. In October 1997 Davidson High School made a sister School agreement with Morioka Chuo High School in Morioka, Japan. In 1999 Davidson High School was awarded the Director-General's Award for School Achievement for "Achievements in Agenda Priority Areas".

In 2007, the Davidson Community of Schools was unveiled by the principal, Rod Cawsey, building closer ties with local primary schools, with the intention to enhance the learning of students in the Davidson community through joint educational programs, combined teacher development and the sharing of resources. The community also consists of Belrose, Kambora, Wakehurst, Mimosa and Terrey Hills Public Schools. In 2011, Davidson High signed a school partnership agreement with the Collège Sainte-Anne de Lachine in Lachine, Quebec, Canada.

=== Badge and motto ===
Davidson Clan Tartan, as used in the school uniform.

While at Killarney Heights High School in 1972, the parents of the first students were granted permission by the Lairds of the Clan Davidson to assume the crest badge, motto, and tartan of Clan Davidson of Tulloch in Scotland. The arms of Davidson of Tulloch were matriculated to Duncan Davidson (1865–1917) by grant of the Court of the Lord Lyon on 12 April 1906. The clan's distinctive tartan colours, motto, and the stag's head crest were incorporated in the school badge, which took the form of an ornate shield with the school name. The Davidson of Tulloch and original Davidson High motto (enclosed within a heraldic belt) – Latin: Sapienter si Sincere – means 'Wisely if Sincerely' or alternately, 'with wisdom if with sincerity'.

During the tenure of the third Principal, Roy Beauman (1983–1987), the motto was altered from the Latin 'Sapienter si Sincere' to English and the words transposed to read 'Sincerely if Wisely'. The ornate shield was replaced with a circlet badge surrounding the stag crest produced in green, white, navy, and brown. A further change occurred during the tenure of Principal John McManus (1988–1990), with the motto altered to 'Wisely Sincerely', and the stag crest enclosed by a simplified shield in red and navy.

== Principals ==
Years	Davidson High School
1972–1974	William Lambert, B.A.
1975–1979	Austin Hayes, B.A.
1980–1982	Betty Anderson, B.A.
1983–1987	Roy Beuman, A.S.T.C.
1988–1990	John McManus, B.A.
1991–1992	Grahame Roe, B.A. BEd Dip.Ed.
1992–1996	Roslynne Moxham, M.A.Ed. B.Mus.Ed. A.Mus.A. F.A.C.E.
1997–2001	Mark Anderson, AM MEd B.A. Dip.Ed.
2002–2005	Chris Bonnor, AM B.A. (Hons) Dip.Ed. Dip.Soc.Ed. F.A.C.E.
2006–2011	Rod Cawsey, MEd B.A. Dip.Teach
2011–2019	Jann Pattinson, B.A. Dip.Ed.
2019–present	David Rule, B.A. Dip.Ed.

== Senior staff ==
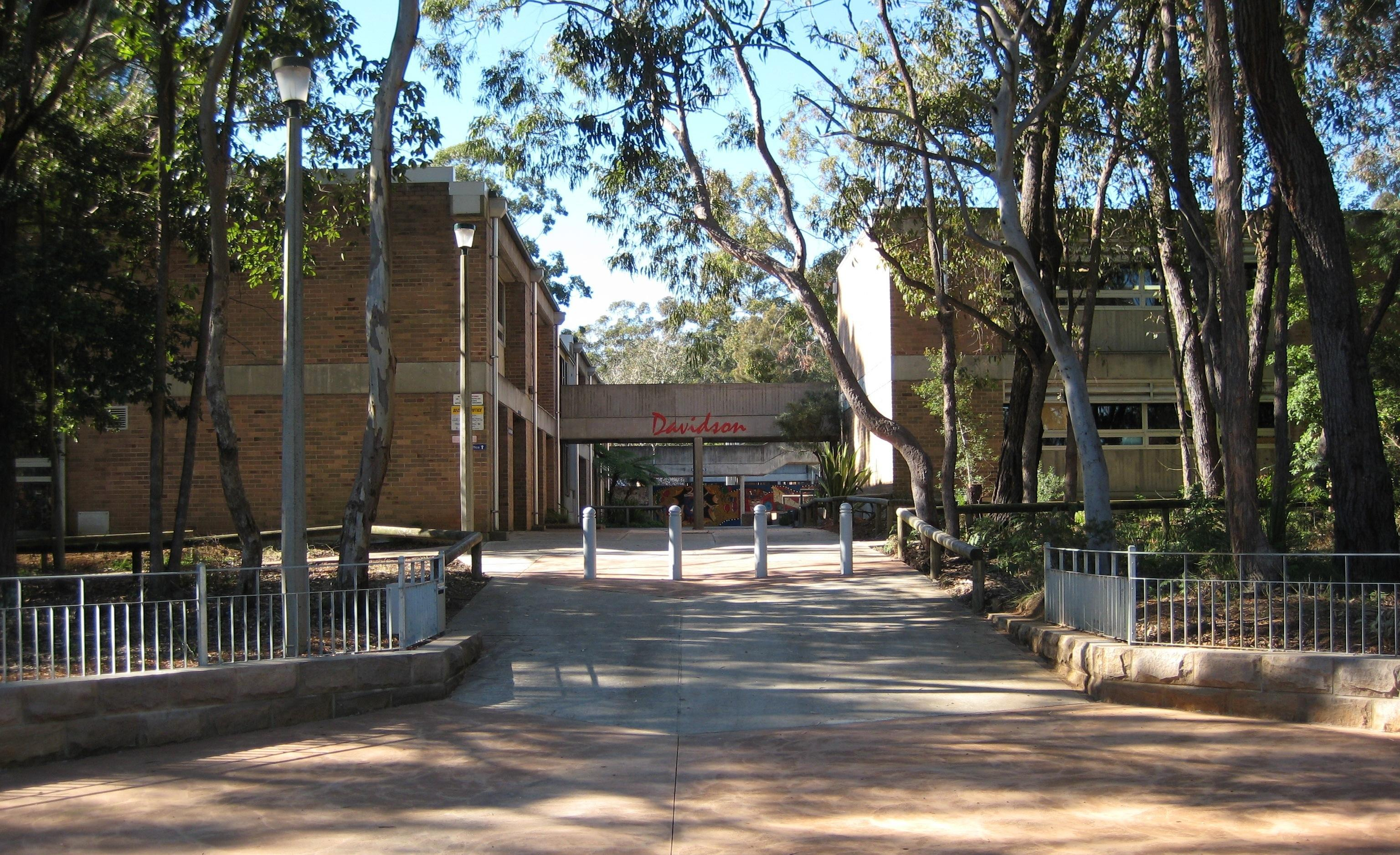
Mimosa Street entrance of school, 2009.

The Principal of DHS from 1992 to 1996 was Roslynne Moxham. In 2002, she was awarded a Fellowship of the Australian College of Educators (FACE) "For contributions through outstanding leadership in NSW high schools and to student learning and teaching practice, particularly in Gifted and Talented Education and Music Education". She was also Principal of Asquith Girls High School and Fort Street High School (2000–2018), before being appointed Director Educational Leadership in the Department of Education.

The principal from 1997 to 2001 was Mark Anderson. On his arrival in 1997 enrolments had dropped from 1145 to 484 in the previous ten years. Anderson introduced a gifted and talented program to target the specialist needs of certain student interests to combat this and by the time of his departure, enrolments stood at over 600. In January 2002 Anderson took up the appointment of the founding Principal of the Sydney Secondary College, which had been created through the amalgamation of three inner-city high schools. Serving until 2004, Anderson became School Education Director for the Western Sydney Region in 2005 and is now Director of People and Careers for the NSW Department of Education since 2014. In the 2018 Australia Day Honours list, Anderson was made a Member of the Order of Australia (AM) for "significant service to secondary education in New South Wales through administrative and executive roles, and to educational standards."

The principal of Davidson High from 2002 to 2005 was Chris Bonnor. During that time he was President of the NSW Secondary Principals Council from 2001 to 2006 and was also a Member of the Australian College of Educators (MACE). Previously he had also been Principal of Asquith Boys’ High School from 1991 to 2000. On 26 January 2007 he was appointed a Member of the Order of Australia (AM) in the General Division for "service to education through significant contributions to the development of educational policy and practice in New South Wales, the promotion of excellence in school leadership, and advocacy for public education." In 2013, he was awarded a Fellowship of the Australian College of Educators (FACE), with his citation noting that he "has demonstrated outstanding professional practice through significant contributions to student learning, teaching and leadership of the NSW Secondary Principals’ Council. Christopher has also made contributions to education policy development in NSW. All of his experience has been characterised by an unwavering commitment to equity of opportunity and outcomes for students."

The principal of Davidson High from 2006 until his retirement in August 2011 was Rod Cawsey, who, as Deputy Principal, took over as acting principal from Chris Bonnor in the third quarter of 2005, but did not become officially principal until 2006. Upon his retirement, Deputy Principal Sue Anderson became Acting Principal until Cawsey's successor was chosen. In October 2011, Jann Pattinson was appointed as the new Principal of Davidson High, effective from 17 November. Pattinson was the coordinator of the Pittwater Community of Schools and also the STEM Project Manager for Macquarie University. Pattinson had previously been the DHS Head Teacher for Teaching and Learning and briefly as acting Deputy Principal before leaving in 2006 to become the Deputy Principal at Moss Vale High School.

== Houses ==
A House system was formed by staff at Davidson in 1973. The four houses were originally named Mimosa, Blackbutt, Belrose and Waratah, after prominent local plant species. The present house system was introduced by the second Principal, Austin Hayes, and were named after the individual stars of the Southern Cross. The current houses of Davidson High School and their associated colours are Gamma, Alpha, Delta and Beta.

== Performing arts ==
Davidson High School has a prominent history in the performing arts, dating back to the school's establishment, with three distinct branches: Music, Dance and Drama. The music program at Davidson comprises several bands that annually perform at the Season of Performing Arts (SOPA) at the Glen Street Theatre, school functions, and at the Northern Beaches Eisteddfod. The vocal ensemble, originally formed in 1973, is the oldest musical group in the school and performs throughout the year, including the Season of Performing Arts and the Schools Spectacular. The school drama programme consists of ensembles of junior and senior students and of which concentrate on working up performances for the Season of Performing Arts, drama nights, and the regional and state drama festivals. In recent years the Drama ensemble has done a 'Drama Tour' to local Schools, performing workshops for young students.

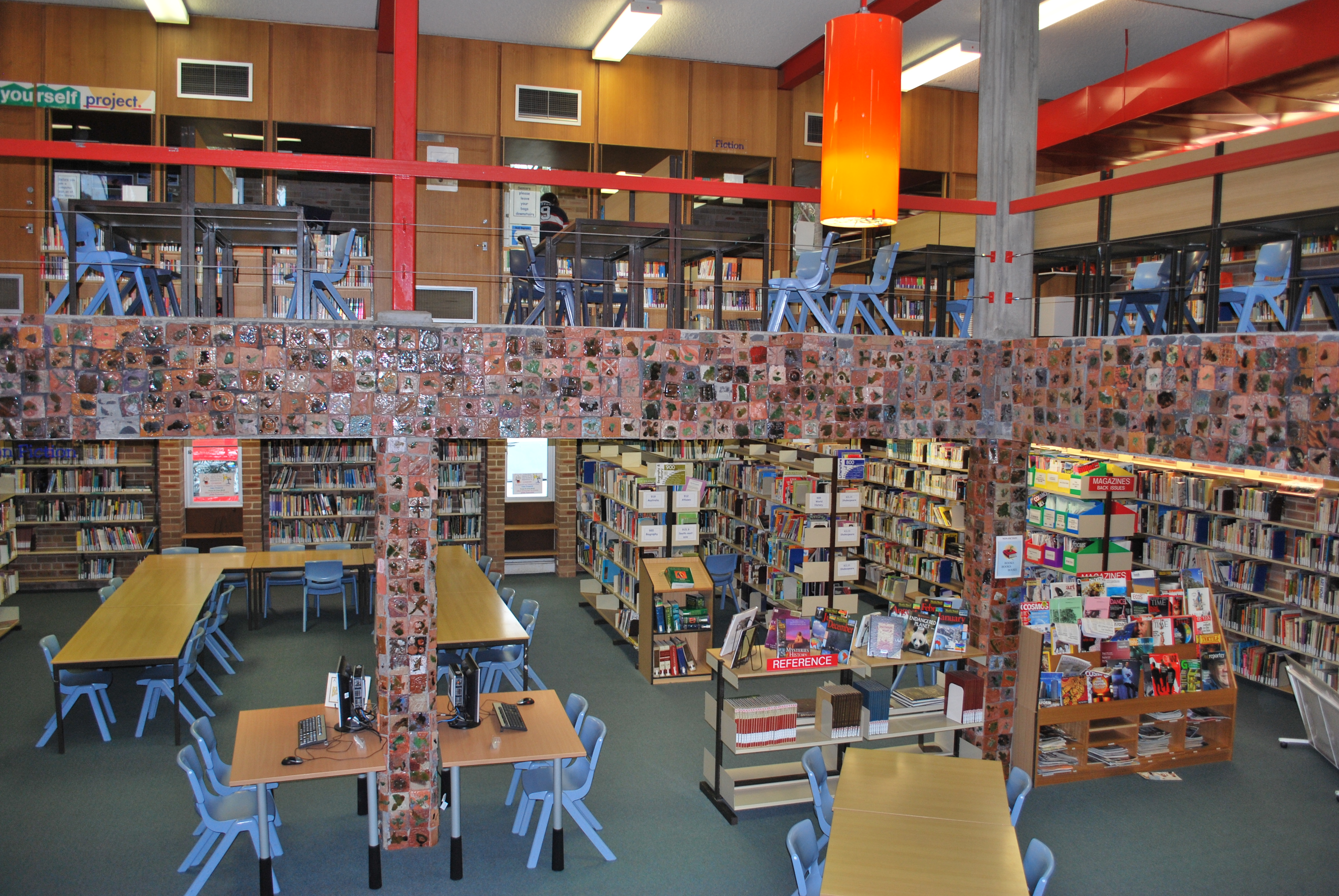
The school Library, 2009.

In dance, students have performed in many competitions such as the NSW Rock Eisteddfod Challenge, in which Davidson participated from its inception in 1980 to the competition's end in 2012, and the Season of Performing Arts.

=== Rock Eisteddfod ===
The school came under external criticism and media scrutiny when Davidson has entered the 2004 Rock Eisteddfod competition with a performance, named "Bad Night in Baghdad", with a satirical and underlying message about the Iraq war. The dance piece sparked up debate over the alleged "politicisation" of schools and freedom of speech, and was criticised by the then Federal Minister for Education, Dr. Brendan Nelson, who said that the production presented an "extremely biased view" of the war. However, the school and the dance piece were also defended by the principal of the day, Chris Bonnor, and New South Wales Deputy-Premier and Education Minister, Andrew Refshauge. Despite this, Davidson went on to take joint first place with Rose Bay Secondary College in the Open grand final and performed at the national competition.

In 2007, Davidson entered a second performance with a similar topic, entitled Bad Knight II, which got the attention of the then Federal Minister for Education, Julie Bishop, who accused the teachers of having "private political agendas" and said that the timing of the performance was "interesting", given the Asia-Pacific Economic Cooperation (APEC) summit was being held in Sydney at the time, where U.S. President George Bush and other foreign leaders would be visiting. The performance was defended by the NSW Minister for Education and Training, John Della Bosca, who accused Bishop of using her supposed concern over the school's performance to criticise the public education system: "I think it's another demonstration of how far out of touch Mrs Bishop and her colleagues in the Howard government are...the concern they have is just another (opportunity) to run down the achievements of young people in public education."

=== Season ===
The "Season of Performing Arts" or "SOPA" was established in 1994, originally as the "Evenings of Performing Arts", as a means of annually showcasing the best of all the performing arts: Music, Dance, and Drama. It is held over several days at the local Glen Street Theatre.

== Student leadership ==
At the instigation of the second Principal, Austin Hayes, the first student council was formed in 1976, and the first School Captains were elected in 1975. The Student Representative Council (SRC) consists of students elected from years 7–11, Prefects are selected in year 12, and house captains for sporting events.

Debating and Public Speaking also play a role in the school, with previous student involvement in the Premier's Debating Challenge, New South Wales Law Society Mock Trial Competition, the Sydney Morning Herald Public Speaking Competition, Rotary 'Youth Speaks' Competition, and the Rotary Model United Nations Assembly.

In February of 2024. Davidson High came under controversy after a shocking Nine News report revealed that over 800 people had signed a petition demanding the School's Hall be renovated. The news report was followed by a montage of photographs showing the hall's smashed windows & damaged window frames, as well as several broken roof tiles.

== Notable alumni and staff ==
=== Academia and community ===
- Cornelia Rau – German citizen and Australian permanent resident who was unlawfully detained as part of the mandatory detention program.
- Associate Professor Nicole Verrills – cancer biologist at the University of Newcastle and the Hunter Medical Research Institute, and recipient of the 2007 Eureka Prize for her research on leukaemia.
- Kirsten Banks – Indigenous Australian astrophysicist and science communicator .

=== Media and business ===
- Tara Brown – Journalist and reporter on the Nine Network show, 60 Minutes, since 2001.

=== Public service ===
- Andrew Humpherson – politician, former Member for Davidson in the NSW Parliament and Deputy Shire President of Warringah Council.
- Commodore Richard Menhinick AM CSC – Retired senior officer of the Royal Australian Navy.

=== Sport ===
- Georgina Rowe – national representative rower, a medallist at the 2018 and 2019 World Rowing Championships.
- Geoff Toovey – former rugby league footballer and coach, and former NRMA Board Director.

=== Entertainment and the arts ===
- Matt Ellis – Singer and songwriter
- Andrew Farriss – keyboardist and key composer for the Australian band INXS.
- Jon Farriss – drummer for the Australian band INXS.
- Michael Hutchence – original lead singer of the Australian rock band INXS.
- Guy Maestri – contemporary artist and winner of the 2009 Archibald Prize
- Sharon Millerchip – Helpmann Award-winning stage actress and performer.
- Lachlan Philpott – playwright and winner of the 2009 Griffin Theatre Company Griffin Award.
- Danielle Spencer – Singer and songwriter.

=== Notable staff ===
- Noila Jean Berglund AM – Deputy Principal (1980–1982), first female Deputy Director-General (Regions and Schools), NSW Department of Education (1990–1993).
