= Forest District (Sydney) =

Region of Sydney, Australia

- Region
- Country: Australia
- State: New South Wales
- City: Sydney
- LGA: Northern Beaches

Government
  - State electorates: Davidson; Pittwater; Wakehurst
  - Federal divisions: Mackellar; Warringah

The Forest Area (or colloquially "the Forest") is an informal area of suburbs at the westernmost point of Sydney's Northern Beaches, in the state of New South Wales, in Australia. The eight suburbs within the area are all located within the local government area of Northern Beaches Council.

The area is located amongst the bushland of Ku-ring-gai Chase National Park and Garigal National Park, east of Middle Harbour and borders Sydney's Upper North Shore.

The area has approximately 28,000 residents.

== Suburbs ==
- Belrose
- Davidson
- Duffys Forest
- Forestville
- Frenchs Forest
- Killarney Heights
- Oxford Falls
- Terrey Hills

== Localities ==
- Austlink
- Bantry Bay
- Wakehurst
- Skyline

== Transport ==
The Forest District is served mostly by CDC NSW, as part of the Region 14 Contract. Keolis Northern Beaches run some services.

== Schools ==
The Forest area is home to wide variety of public, Catholic, independent, specialist and alternative education schools:

State Schools

- Kambora Public School
- Davidson High School
- Belrose Public School
- Wakehurst Public School
- Mimosa Public School
- Frenchs Forest Public School
- The Forest High School
- Forestville Public School
- Killarney Heights Public School
- Killarney Heights High School
- Terrey Hills Public School

Catholic Schools

- St Martin De Porres Catholic Primary School
- Our Lady of Good Counsel Catholic Primary School

Independent Schools

- John Colet School
- Covenant Christian School
- Northern Beaches Christian School
- AGBU Alexander Primary School

Specialist Schools

- The German International School
- Sydney Japanese School
- Aspect Vern Barnett School

Alternative Education Schools

- Kamaroi Rudolf Steiner School
- Kinma School
- Forestville Montessori School
- Yanginanook School

== Sport ==
Some of the associations in which people living in the Forest District participate in include:

- Northern Sydney Rebels Gridiron Club
- Forest District Rugby Union Club
- Forestville Ferrets Junior Rugby League Club
- Forest Lions Junior Australian Football Club (AFL)
- Belrose Eagles Rugby League Club
- Belrose Netball Club
- Forest Netball Club
- Forest/Killarney Soccer (Football) Club
- Belrose-Terrey Hills Raiders Soccer (Football) Club
- Wakehurst Football Club (Soccer)
