= Lucas Neill =

Australian soccer player (born 1978)

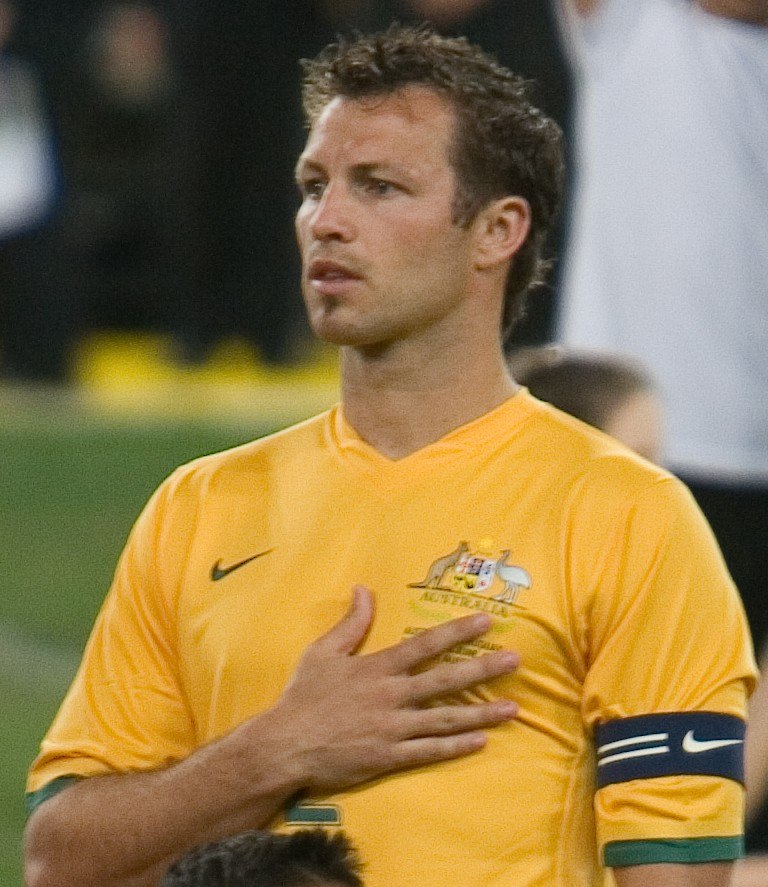
- Neill with Australia in 2007

Personal information
- Full name: Lucas Edward Neill
- Date of birth: 9 March 1978 (age 48)
- Place of birth: Sydney, Australia
- Height: 1.85 m (6 ft 1 in)
- Position: Defender

Youth career
- 1991–1993: Manly United
- 1994–1995: AIS

Senior career*
Years	Team	Apps	(Gls)
1995–2001	Millwall	152	(13)
2001–2007	Blackburn Rovers	188	(5)
2007–2009	West Ham United	79	(1)
2009–2010	Everton	12	(0)
2010–2011	Galatasaray	39	(1)
2011–2012	Al Jazira	19	(3)
2012–2013	Al Wasl	4	(0)
2013	Sydney FC	3	(0)
2013	Omiya Ardija	9	(0)
2014	Watford	1	(0)
2014	→ Doncaster Rovers (loan)	4	(0)
Total		510	(23)

International career
1996–1997	Australia U20	8	(3)
1999–2000	Australia U23	13	(0)
1996–2013	Australia	96	(1)
Medal record
Men's football
Representing Australia
AFC Asian Cup
Runner-up	2011 Qatar
OFC Nations Cup
Winner	2004 Australia
OFC U-20 Championship
Winner	Tahiti 1997
- * Club domestic league appearances and goals

Lucas Edward Neill (born 9 March 1978) is an Australian former soccer player. Neill played as a defender, often playing as a centre back as well as a full-back. Neill spent almost 15 years of his career playing in England. He represented Australia at the 2006 FIFA World Cup, the 2007 AFC Asian Cup, the 2010 FIFA World Cup in South Africa, and also the 2011 AFC Asian Cup in Qatar. On 6 October 2006 he was named the 50th captain of the Australian national team, and by the time of his retirement, had amassed a record 61 caps as captain. He played for Millwall, Blackburn Rovers, West Ham United, Everton, Galatasaray, Al Jazira, Al Wasl, Sydney FC, Omiya Ardija, Watford and Doncaster Rovers.

== Early life ==
Neill's father moved to Australia from Northern Ireland, where he had played for local football clubs Brantwood F.C., Linfield F.C., and Cliftonville F.C. Neill grew up in Manly, Sydney and was a student at Wakehurst Public School in Belrose and St Augustine's College in Brookvale, before attending the Australian Institute of Sport on a football scholarship in 1994–95.

== Club career ==
=== Millwall ===
Neill joined Millwall on a free transfer in November 1995, making his debut on 17 February against Luton Town in 1996. In almost six years at The Den, he made 174 appearances in all competitions, scoring 13 goals. In September 2001, Neill, by then the longest serving player at the club, submitted a transfer request and shortly after, signed for Blackburn Rovers for an initial fee of £600,000 plus up to £400,000 more depending on appearances.

=== Blackburn Rovers ===
Neill played his first game for Blackburn in September 2001 against Sunderland and scored his first Blackburn goal later that month against Bolton Wanderers. Neill was well regarded by Blackburn Rovers supporters and held the right back position for over five years for the Blackburn Rovers. Blackburn won the 2001–02 Football League Cup but Neill was cup-tied.

Neill's combative and committed style of play in the Premier League attracted criticism in 2003–04 at a time when Blackburn had been criticised routinely for their aggressive play. He broke the leg of Liverpool defender Jamie Carragher when his trailing leg caught that of the Liverpool player in the fifth game of the 2003–04 season in a tackle at Ewood Park. Carragher, a popular home-grown Liverpool player, was sidelined for six months and the incident sparked a war of words between Gérard Houllier and Graeme Souness after Neill and his manager did not apologise for 48 hours.

Johan Neeskens, who became assistant to Barcelona manager Frank Rijkaard for the 2006–07 season, said that Neill "could play for any of the best clubs". On 4 August 2006 he announced he would not sign a new four-year contract for Blackburn Rovers. The player's agent, Peter Harrison, said "He has enjoyed his time [at Blackburn], he loves the club and the fans, he just feels it is time for a change." On 30 August, Liverpool reportedly made a £2 million bid for Neill; however, this bid was rejected by Blackburn. The club wanted Stephen Warnock in part exchange for Neill, but Liverpool were not prepared to let the left back go. In late November, rumours emerged that Chelsea were also interested in his signature. Neill, once a cult hero at Blackburn, left under something of a storm and became very unpopular amongst Blackburn fans. He was booed and barracked on his return to Ewood Park in March 2007.

=== West Ham United ===
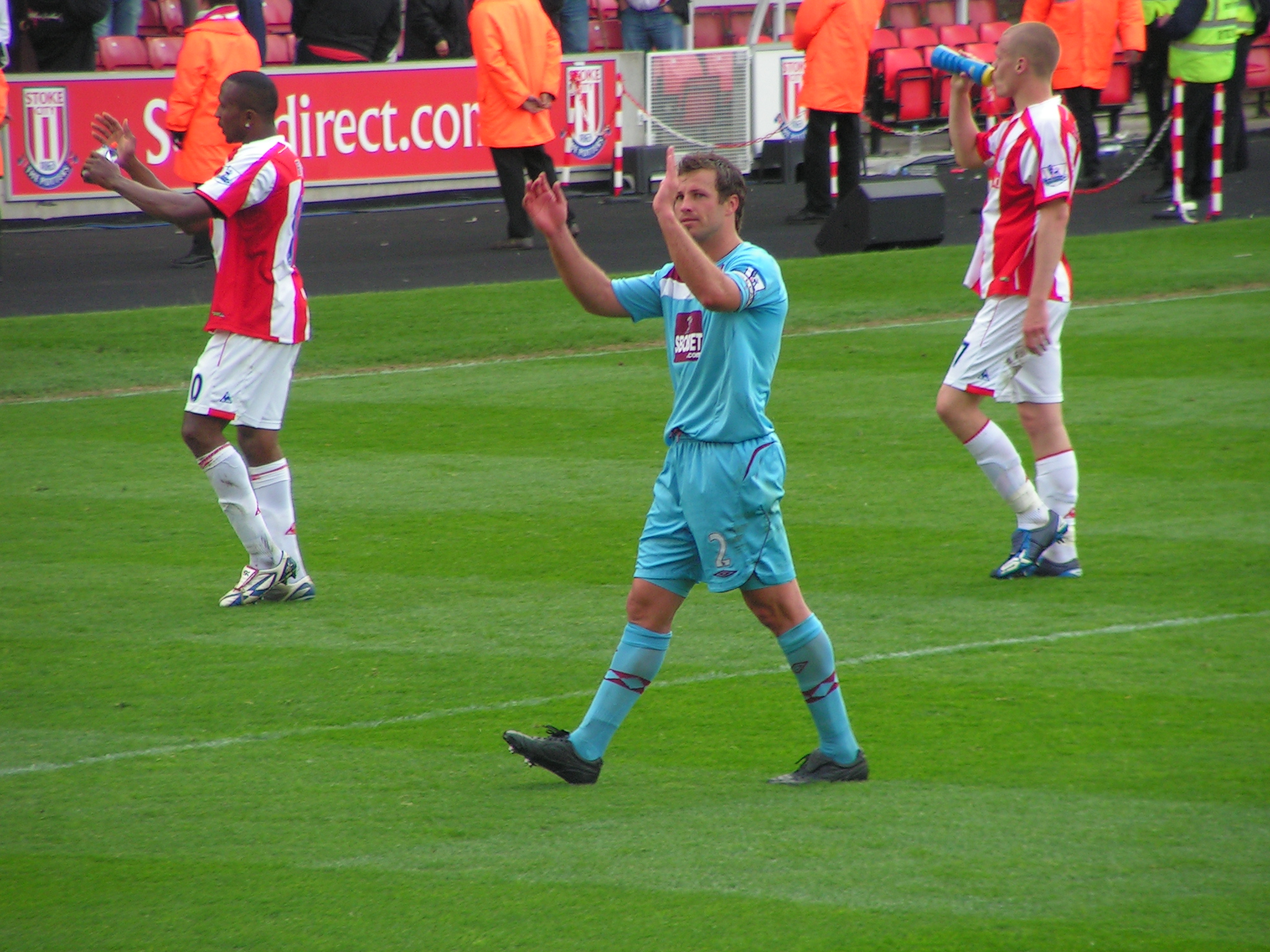
Neill playing for West Ham.

In January 2007 Neill turned his back on an un-confirmed bid from Liverpool in favour of West Ham United, following the successful transfer of Stephen Warnock from Liverpool to Blackburn. Neill was accused of his primary motivating factor being money, but he later refuted these claims, stating the move was for purely footballing reasons. Neill later alleged to the media that Liverpool had not made him feel truly wanted, and that he had not even spoken to manager Rafael Benítez. Neill made his league debut for the Hammers in February 2007 against Watford, where he picked up a knee injury. He captained the team for the first time during a 3–4 defeat against Tottenham Hotspur the following month and went on to play every remaining game of the season. He became the permanent team captain following Nigel Reo-Coker's transfer to Aston Villa. Neill made his first appearance as team captain in the 1–1 draw against Wigan Athletic on 25 August 2007. Neill scored his only goal for West Ham in a 3–2 away defeat to West Brom in September 2008. At the end of the 2008–09 season Neill rejected a one-year contract extension with West Ham, becoming a free agent.

=== Everton ===
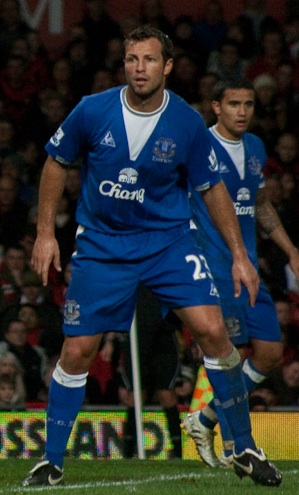
Neill and national teammate Tim Cahill playing for Everton in 2009

On 17 September 2009, Neill joined close friend Tim Cahill at Everton on a free transfer, signing a one-year deal. He was unveiled to the fans at half time during Everton's 4–0 Europa League win at Goodison Park against AEK Athens.

Neill played his first game for Everton on 23 September 2009 in the League Cup, coming on as a second half substitution for Leighton Baines, in their 4–0 victory over Hull City. Neill's first start for Everton in the Premier League was on 25 October 2009 where he played a full match against Bolton Wanderers setting up two goals.

=== Galatasaray ===
On 13 January 2010, Neill agreed to join Turkish side Galatasaray. Neill signed a one-and-a-half-year contract with Galatasaray, linking up with Socceroo teammate Harry Kewell. Neill made his Turkish Super Lig debut for Galatasaray on 24 January 2010 in a 1–0 home win at the Ali Sami Yen Stadium against Gaziantepspor. Neill along with Kewell and several others were released at the end of the 2010–11 season.

=== Al Jazira ===
On 19 August 2011 it was announced he had signed a one-year contract with UAE Pro League Club Al Jazira. On 2 June 2012 it was announced he had been released by the club.

=== Al Wasl ===
He signed in August 2012 one-year contract with Al Wasl. In January 2013, Neill was released from Al Wasl after the club signed Ahmad Ibrahim Khalaf, thus replacing Neill as an import player.

=== Sydney FC ===
In February 2013 Neill signed with Sydney FC. He made his A-League debut for Sydney FC against Melbourne Heart on 24 February 2013 at AAMI Park in Melbourne. Neill played just four games of his ten-game guest stint at Sydney FC.

=== Omiya Ardija ===
On 18 August 2013, Neill signed with Japanese team Omiya Ardija. He signed a four-month deal for the remainder of the Japanese season. In November 2013, at the end of the Japanese football season, Neill was not offered a contract extension, and had to start looking for another club. He offered his services to all the A-League clubs but did not receive any offers.

=== Watford ===
On 24 February 2014 Neill signed for Championship team, Watford for the remainder of the 2013-14 season, but made only one appearance, as an 84th-minute substitute in a 3–0 home win against Barnsley on 15 March before being released in June 2014 effectively ending his career as a player.

==== Doncaster Rovers (loan) ====
Not needed for cover as Watford's injury worries eased, Neill moved to Doncaster Rovers on 26 March 2014 on a loan until 22 April 2014, subsequently extended for the remainder of the 2013–14 season. Neill made four appearances for the club. On 8 September 2015, it was reported that Neill was close to signing with National Premier Leagues NSW club Hakoah Sydney City East FC, with Neill identified as a potential leader at the club whose roster is replete with talented youngsters.

== International career ==
In October 1996, Neill became the third-youngest player, after Duncan Cummings and Harry Kewell, to debut for the Australian national team when he played in a friendly game against Saudi Arabia in Riyadh, aged 18 years and 7 months. He also competed at the 2000 Summer Olympics in Sydney with the Australian men's team, the Olyroos.

On 16 November 2005 at Sydney's ANZ Stadium, Neill helped Australia qualify for the 2006 FIFA World Cup playing the entire game and scoring the Socceroos' second penalty in a shoot-out against Uruguay, after aggregate scores were tied at 1–1 following extra-time. He was named Man of the Match for this game.

Neill started all four of Australia's games at the 2006 World Cup. In the closing minutes of Australia's Round of 16 game against Italy, he was involved in a controversial incident, as referee Luis Medina Cantalejo adjudged Neill to have fouled Italian full back Fabio Grosso in the penalty area. Francesco Totti converted the ensuing penalty kick to score and give the Italians a 1–0 victory, knocking Australia out of the cup.

Following the World Cup, on 6 October 2006 was named as the 50th player to captain Australia. On 7 October 2006 he made his debut as the Socceroos' captain in a 1–1 friendly against Paraguay, in Brisbane. Four days later, in Sydney, he captained Australia again in an Asian Cup qualifying game against Bahrain, which Australia won 2–0. On 2 June 2007, Neill captained the Socceroos again in a friendly match against Uruguay at Sydney's Telstra Stadium in which Australia lost 2–1.

On 13 July 2007, in the dying seconds of the Socceroo's 3–1 loss to Iraq, Neill verbally abused the referee. He received his second yellow card and was sent off, capping a disappointing performance by the Australian side. In the quarter-finals of the Asian Cup, Neill missed a crucial penalty in a shootout against Japan which resulted in Australia's elimination from the cup. Neill played his 50th game for Australia in a World Cup Qualifier against Japan, a game that Australia won 2–1 with Tim Cahill scoring both goals. In June 2013 Neill scored his first international goal with a header in a World Cup qualifying match against Jordan which finished 4–0. It was his 91st appearance for Australia and 16 years and 245 days since his debut.

In the final part of the 2014 World Cup qualifying, Neill came under much criticism in the media and from fans. It was during this period that Neill spent a considerable period unable to find a new club contract after not managing to secure an extension to his contract with Sydney FC. The nub of the criticism was that Neill continued to be selected as Socceroos captain, in spite of not having regular game time at a club, and having been dropped by two Middle Eastern clubs, Al Jazira Club and Al Wasl FC, and having made minimal impact in his short time in Australia's domestic A-League. With these criticisms hanging over his head, the issue of Neill's age-related lack of pace was highlighted when the Socceroos were defeated 6–0 in a friendly against Brazil on 7 September 2013, and again defeated 6–0 against France on 11 October 2013. Fox Sports Australia prepared a video analysis of the 12 goals scored against the Socceroos by France and Brazil in the two friendlies, identifying Neill's role in the lack of defence for the bulk of those goals.

Sections of the press and social media called for Neill to retire with commentator Robbie Slater stating Neill should be stood down as Socceroos captain. Another media commentator Mark Bosnich described Neill as "part of the problem" for the successive 6–0 losses, given Neill's lack of pace in defence. Neill responded to the criticism, refusing to contemplate retirement, instead appearing to lay the blame at the feet of the younger players of the squad. In that media interview, Neill was quoted as saying: "I add value to the team and I bring a lot of good attributes but I am the victim ...".

On 6 May 2014, it was revealed that Socceroos team boss Ange Postecoglou had advised Neill that he would not be part of Australia's squad at the 2014 World Cup.

== Personal life ==
Neill's son, Marcus, currently plays at the Sunderland Academy, having previously played at the Liverpool Academy and Blackburn Rovers Academy. On 2 May 2016, Neill was declared bankrupt in the United Kingdom.

On 20 November 2023, at Preston Crown Court, Neill was found not guilty of purposefully hiding money from his bankruptcy proceedings. After the verdict, he spoke to The Times and said he was living in a rented house and his children had to move schools as he could no longer afford the school fees – Neill also said how at the height of his financial struggles, the electricity was cut off in his house. He told the newspaper that he was now coaching football at a local women's team and was also working as a project manager for a local digital firm.

== Career statistics ==
=== Club ===
Appearances and goals by club, season and competition
Club	Season	League		Cups (Note: Includes FA Cup, League Cup, FA Community Shield, League Trophy and Turkish Cup)		Continental		Total	
Club	Season	Apps	Goals	Apps	Goals	Apps	Goals	Apps	Goals
Millwall	1995–96	13	0	0	0	0	0	13	0
Millwall	1996–97	39	4	5	0	0	0	44	4
Millwall	1997–98	6	0	1	0	0	0	7	0
Millwall	1998–99	35	6	9	0	0	0	44	6
Millwall	1999–00	31	1	4	0	0	0	35	1
Millwall	2000–01	24	2	1	0	0	0	25	2
Millwall	2001–02	4	1	1	0	0	0	5	1
Millwall	Total	152	14	21	0	0	0	173	14
Blackburn Rovers	2001–02	31	1	4	0	0	0	35	1
Blackburn Rovers	2002–03	34	0	7	0	4	0	45	0
Blackburn Rovers	2003–04	32	2	2	0	1	0	35	2
Blackburn Rovers	2004–05	36	1	8	0	0	0	44	1
Blackburn Rovers	2005–06	35	1	7	2	0	0	42	3
Blackburn Rovers	2006–07	20	0	1	0	5	1	26	1
Blackburn Rovers	Total	188	5	29	2	10	1	227	8
West Ham United	2006–07	11	0	1	0	0	0	12	0
West Ham United	2007–08	34	0	6	0	0	0	40	0
West Ham United	2008–09	34	1	3	0	0	0	36	1
West Ham United	Total	78	1	10	0	0	0	88	1
Everton	2009–10	12	0	2	0	0	0	14	0
Galatasaray	2009–10	14	1	2	0	2	0	18	1
Galatasaray	2010–11	25	0	2	0	4	0	29	0
Galatasaray	Total	37	1	4	0	6	0	47	1
Al Jazira	2011–12	19	3	1	1	3	0	23	4
Al Wasl	2012–13	11	0	1	1	0	0	15	1
Sydney FC	2012–13	3	0	0	0	0	0	3	0
Omiya Ardija	2013	9	0	0	0	0	0	9	0
Watford	2014	1	0	–	–	–	–	1	0
Doncaster Rovers (loan)	2014	4	0	–	–	–	–	4	0
Career total		517	24	68	4	19	1	604	29

=== International ===
Appearances and goals by national team and year
National team	Year	Apps	Goals
Australia	1996	1	0
Australia	1997	0	0
Australia	1998	1	0
Australia	1999	0	0
Australia	2000	0	0
Australia	2001	0	0
Australia	2002	0	0
Australia	2003	3	0
Australia	2004	5	0
Australia	2005	12	0
Australia	2006	9	0
Australia	2007	8	0
Australia	2008	7	0
Australia	2009	7	0
Australia	2010	10	0
Australia	2011	16	0
Australia	2012	9	0
Australia	2013	8	1
Total		96	1

Score and result list Australia's goal tally first, score column indicates score after Neill goal.

International goals scored by Lucas Neill
No.	Date	Venue	Opponent	Score	Result	Competition
1	11 June 2013	Docklands Stadium, Melbourne, Australia	Jordan	4–0	4–0	2014 FIFA World Cup qualification

== Honours ==
Millwall

- Football League Second Division: 2000–01

Al Jazira

- UAE President's Cup: 2011–12

Australia

- AFC Asian Cup runner-up: 2011
- OFC Nations Cup: 2004

Australia U-20

- OFC U-19 Men's Championship: 1997

Individual

- Millwall Player of the Year: 1996–97
