= Frenchs Forest =

- Suburb
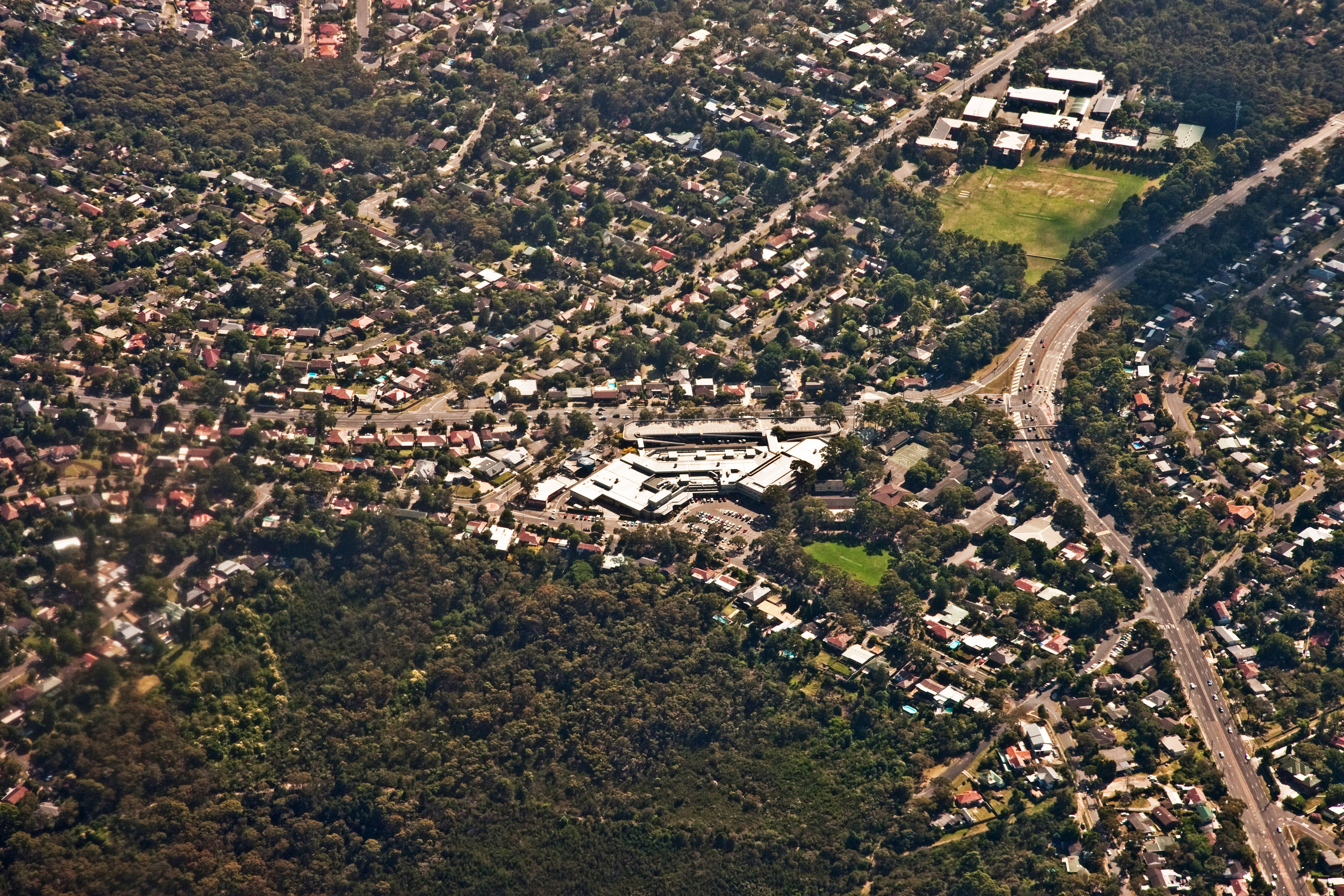
- Frenchs Forest from the air, with Forestway in the centre

- Interactive map of Frenchs Forest
- Coordinates: 33°44′56″S 151°13′59″E
- Country: Australia
- State: New South Wales
- City: Sydney
- LGA: Northern Beaches Council
- Location: 20 km (12 mi) north of Sydney CBD

Government
  - State electorate: Davidson, Wakehurst
  - Federal division: Warringah, Mackellar

Area
  - Total: 9.1 km^{2} (3.5 sq mi)
- Elevation: 149 m (489 ft)

Population
  - Total: 14,267 (2021 census)
  - Density: 1,568/km^{2} (4,061/sq mi)
- Postcode: 2086
Suburbs around Frenchs Forest
Belrose	Belrose	Oxford Falls
Davidson	Frenchs Forest	Beacon Hill
Forestville	Seaforth	Allambie Heights

Frenchs Forest (pron. frenches) is a suburb of northern Sydney, in the state of New South Wales, Australia. Frenchs Forest is 20 kilometres north of the Sydney central business district in the local government area of Northern Beaches Council. Frenchs Forest is part of Sydney's Northern Beaches region and also considered to be part of the Forest District, colloquially known as The Forest by its locals.

During the 2010s, the suburb underwent rezoning which includes a new hospital, town centre, new relocated high school, 2,200 new homes and $500 million to upgrade the roads around the new Northern Beaches Hospital.

The rezoning was completed in time for the hospital opening in 2019.

== History ==
=== Aboriginal culture ===
Prior to the arrival of the First Fleet in Port Jackson in 1788, the area of land we now know as Frenchs Forest, and surrounding Warringah areas, was the home of the Dharug language group of the Garigal Aboriginal clan. Evidence of their habitation remains today in the form of rock engravings, rock art, open campsites, rock shelters, scarred trees and middens. The word Warringah has many interpretations including "sign of rain", "across the waves" and "sea".

=== European settlement ===
European exploration into Warringah began within the first weeks of settlement at Sydney Cove in 1788. Governor Phillip made a number of journeys throughout the area, detailing the landscape, flora and fauna, as well as observing Aboriginal lifestyle and culture. Although Beacon Hill advertises the "Arthur Phillip lookout" at its peak, it is believed by some historians that Phillip's travels actually took him through Bantry Bay and up into Frenchs Forest to gain views over the area.

In 1853, Simeon Henry Pearce (1821–1886) and his brother James acquired 200 acres (0.81 km^{2}) in this area. The property was later known as Rodborough when it was acquired by James French, a police constable, who took over Warringah.

Despite its relative proximity to Sydney, Frenchs Forest remained predominantly rural throughout the nineteenth century and the first half of the twentieth century. A 1951 article in The Bulletin noted:

Ten years ago the Forest and the Chase really gave Sydney a unique charm. Less than 20 miles from the G.P.O. and you were in the midst of almost unsullied bush where you could still see wallabies, rabbits restored to respectability by their distance from grazing lands, and even, towards Whale Beach, koalas; where sun-orchid, greenhood and hyacinth-orchid flowered low in the scrub with blackeyed-Susan and the wild iris under starry tea-tree or the creamy foam of dwarf-apples; where boronia and wax-flower in their seasons glowed all along the roadsides, or native-holly fit a whole gully with rusty gold. And year by year, while the rangers busied themselves harassing the picnickers who dared snatch a couple of flannel-flowers, the dumpers from the suburbs made the place one gigantic garbage-tip, where if you weren't merely sick you would probably be bitten among the refuse by funnel-web spiders, redbacks, bulldog-ants and death-adders. A lot of the Forest has itself now become a suburb; it will probably be burnt down annually and need not be bothered about any more. But much remains worth preserving; and all the Chase.

== Geography ==
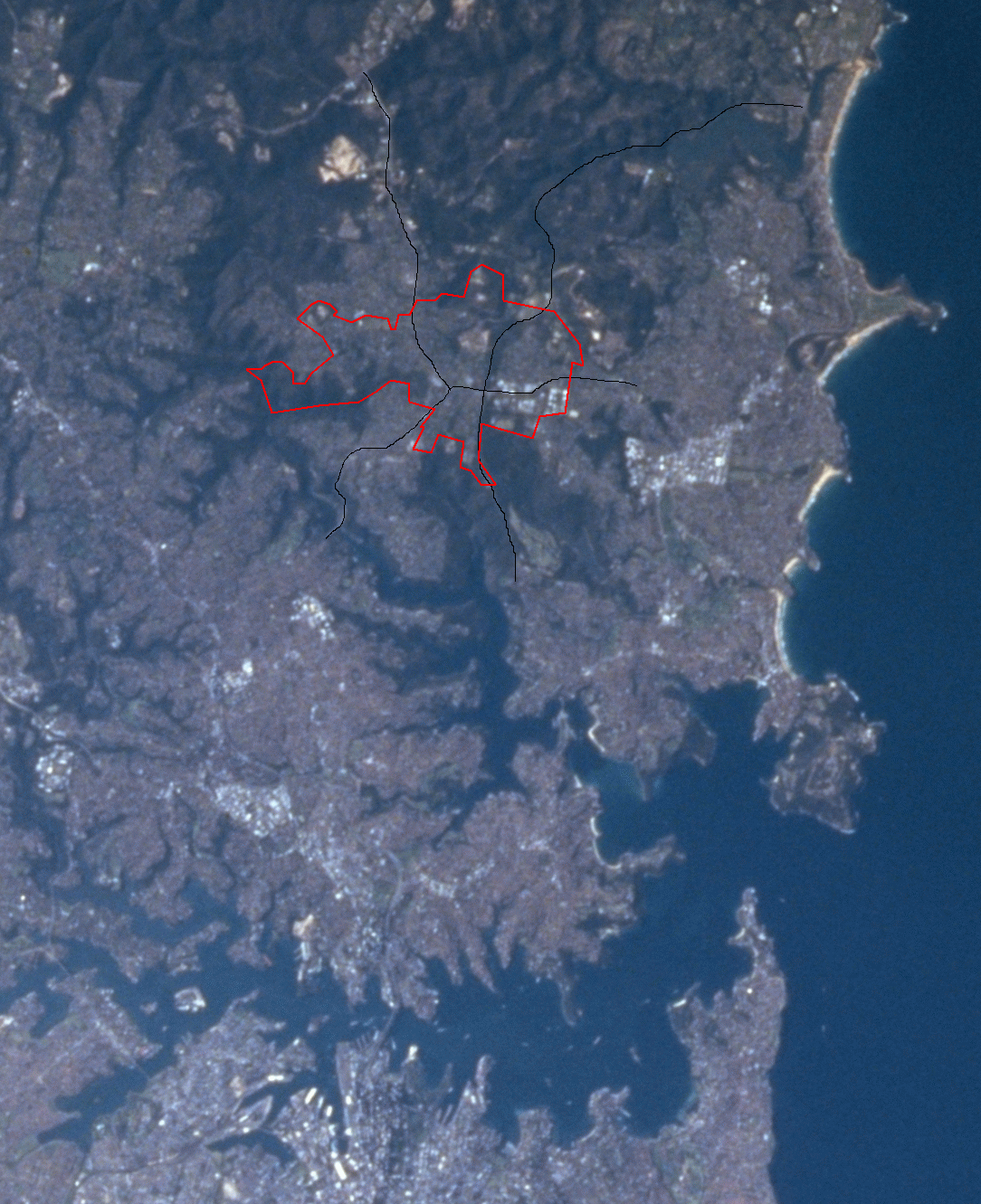
NASA satellite view of Frenchs Forest within the Sydney area

Frenchs Forest is close to the Garigal National Park. It is elevated (~156 m ASL) regularly having high rainfall compared with the rest of Sydney and is spread along ridgelines surrounded by native bushland. The eastern parts have distant views (3 km) over the Pacific Ocean and the temperature extremes typical of Sydney are moderated by this proximity. The western side has views over Chatswood, St Leonards, North Sydney and Sydney CBD, bounded by Garigal National Park featuring native wildlife, birds, turtles, wallabies, lizards, snakes. Bush tracks include bluff track, natural bridge track, Carroll Creek track and the Pipeline track.

=== Climate ===
Frenchs Forest climate is similar to the Climate of Sydney, albeit with a few minor seasonal differences: winters tend to be cooler and wetter than in the city, while summers tend to be less hot.

Climate data for Macquarie Park
Month	Jan	Feb	Mar	Apr	May	Jun	Jul	Aug	Sep	Oct	Nov	Dec	Year
Record high °C (°F)	47.1 (116.8)	41.4 (106.5)	40.7 (105.3)	33.5 (92.3)	28.5 (83.3)	24.8 (76.6)	26.0 (78.8)	30.1 (86.2)	34.4 (93.9)	39.1 (102.4)	42.0 (107.6)	43.1 (109.6)	47.1 (116.8)
Mean daily maximum °C (°F)	27.7 (81.9)	27.4 (81.3)	25.9 (78.6)	23.4 (74.1)	20.3 (68.5)	17.4 (63.3)	17.1 (62.8)	18.5 (65.3)	21.1 (70.0)	23.3 (73.9)	24.8 (76.6)	27.1 (80.8)	22.8 (73.0)
Mean daily minimum °C (°F)	16.9 (62.4)	16.9 (62.4)	15.2 (59.4)	12.0 (53.6)	9.2 (48.6)	6.5 (43.7)	4.9 (40.8)	5.7 (42.3)	7.8 (46.0)	10.8 (51.4)	13.0 (55.4)	15.6 (60.1)	11.2 (52.2)
Record low °C (°F)	8.5 (47.3)	8.9 (48.0)	6.1 (43.0)	2.5 (36.5)	0.3 (32.5)	−1.7 (28.9)	−3.5 (25.7)	−1.1 (30.0)	0.1 (32.2)	0.9 (33.6)	1.2 (34.2)	6.5 (43.7)	−3.5 (25.7)
Average precipitation mm (inches)	115.7 (4.56)	142.1 (5.59)	133.4 (5.25)	107.6 (4.24)	86.9 (3.42)	114.4 (4.50)	51.7 (2.04)	57.6 (2.27)	59.3 (2.33)	83.9 (3.30)	94.8 (3.73)	84.4 (3.32)	1,135.3 (44.70)

== Commercial areas ==
Forestway Shopping Centre is at the intersection of Forest Way and Warringah Road. The centre includes an Aldi and Woolworths supermarkets and over 50 speciality stores.

Smaller shopping centres are located at Sorlie Road featuring a variety of restaurants and Skyline shops on Frenchs Forest Road East, the name being derived from the 'Skyline Drive-in Movie Theatre' that existed nearby until the mid-1980s.

Frenchs Forest Town Centre is a proposed shopping mall, aquatic centre and high-rise residential development.

== Schools ==
Frenchs Forest is home to a number of schools:

- The Forest High School
- Davidson High School
- Frenchs Forest Public School
- Mimosa Public School
- Arranounbai School

== Churches ==
- Frenchs Forest Anglican Church
- Frenchs Forest Uniting Church] (also known as "The Kirk")
- Forest Alliance Church
- Frenchs Forest Baptist

Although named Frenchs Forest Catholic Parish, the three church buildings that make up the parish are located in the adjoining suburbs of Davidson, Forestville & Terrey Hills.

== Transport ==
=== Road ===
The main routes through Frenchs Forest include the east-west Warringah Road (State route A38), connecting Roseville in the west with Brookvale in the east; the north-south Forest Way, starting at Warringah Road in Frenchs Forest and heading north through Belrose to Terrey Hills, connecting with Mona Vale Road (8 km); and the north-south Wakehurst Parkway (State route 22), starting at Narrabeen in the northeast, crossing Frenchs Forest Road and Warringah Road in Frenchs Forest, and heading south to Seaforth, leading to the Spit Bridge. Following any of these three major roads lead to the only three road routes in and out of the Northern Beaches district.

The intersection of Wakehurst Parkway and Warringah Road was the scene of multiple high speed collisions following the opening of the Wakehurst Parkway in 1946. In an attempt to improve safety a blinking light was suspended above the intersection to warn motorists of the danger, which earned the intersection the enduring name of 'The Blinking Light'.

=== Buses ===
CDC NSW connects Frenchs Forest with Chatswood railway station in the west, Westfield Warringah Mall shopping centre at Brookvale in the east and Terrey Hills in the north, with bus services running to Town Hall station in the Sydney central business district. Keolis Northern Beaches runs a number of bus lines through the Frenchs Forest area, including the 160X bus service which connects Chatswood to Dee Why, and other services to Manly and Narrabeen.

== Culture ==
- Frenchs Forest Showground has "off leash" areas for dogs and horse events.

=== Events ===
- Forest Funday, is an annual free fair provided by the combined Christian churches of The Forest on Anzac Day, 25 April at Frenchs Forest Showground.
- Eurofest at Ararat Reserve in mid-September involves all the ethnic clubs in the area.

=== Clubs ===
- The Scout Hall.
- The Girls Guides Hall.
- Ararat Reserve (named after the Ararat plains of Ancient Armenia) on Bantry Bay Road features a number of ethnic clubs.

=== Sport and recreation ===
- The Warringah Aquatic Centre features an Olympic size indoor heated swimming pool and baseball pitches.
- Lionel Watts Oval provides sports fields for cricket, Australian rules football, soccer, rugby league, netball and has a skate park. Immediately next to the oval is a fenced, dog off-leash area, for dogs to run and play.
- A combination cycle/cycle-pedestrian shared/cycle-road path (completed c. 1982) from the corner of Wakehurst Parkway and Frenchs Forest Road, connecting Frenchs Forest with Dee Why. The signposting/painted lines on roads is aged and can be a little difficult to follow.
- The fenced playground for young kids at Lionel Watts Oval (Blackbutts Rd) has a mini-track suitable for toddlers and small kids on tricycles. Rebuilt in 2019.
- Manly Dam Reserve is adjacent to (southeast of) Frenchs Forest, containing pedestrian/mountain bike bush tracks.
- Manly-Warringah Radio Society using callsign VK2MB is the local club for Amateur Radio Operators & services the Frenchs Forest area, with club rooms at Terrey Hills.

== Demographics ==
In the 2021 census of Population and Housing, the population of the Frenchs Forest postcode area was 14,267 people. The population was 50.4% female, 49.6% male. In Frenchs Forest, 68.8% of people were born in Australia. The most common countries of birth were England 7.3%, China 2.3%, New Zealand 2.2%, South Africa 1.9% and India 0.9%. 80.5% of people only spoke English at home. Other languages spoken at home included Mandarin 2.7%, Armenian 1.6%, French 1.4%, Cantonese 1.3% and Italian 0.9%. The most common responses for religion were No Religion 40.8%, Catholic 23.1% and Anglican 15.3%.

Of occupied private dwellings in Frenchs Forest, 92.5% were separate houses, 4.3% were semi-detached and 3.1% were flats or apartments.

== Notable people ==
- Cameron Davis (golfer) Pro PGA Golfer, 3-time winner of the Rocket Classic, he has also won the Nashville Golf Open and the Australian Open (golf)
- Faith Bandler – civil rights activist
- Leila Hayes – actress
- Isabella Lombardo – child with spastic quadriplegic cerebral palsy
- James Mathison – television presenter
- Shelley Oates – Australian sprint canoeist
- Donald Shanks – singer
- Julie Sutton – former mayor of Warringah Council
