= Isabella Lombardo =

Australian child with a form of cerebral palsy

Isabella Lombardo is an Australian child with spastic quadriplegic cerebral palsy who underwent a selective dorsal rhizotomy procedure at the age of four and a separate stem cell surgery at the age of six. Her story was profiled on an episode of 60 Minutes in 2018, and in a feature-length documentary film –The Unknown Upside, about her surgeries and subsequent treatments which premiered in March 2019.

== Life ==
Lombardo was born to parents Joseph and Libby Lombardo in Frenchs Forest, New South Wales. It was not immediately clear to her doctors or parents that she was born with any type of condition. When she was two months old, Lombardo was still unable to lift her head up on her own. It took two years for doctors to correctly diagnose her with spastic diplegia, which is a form of cerebral palsy. Quadriplegic cerebral palsy prevented her from walking without help from a walking frame or other people, and she only moved independently with a wheelchair. To reduce muscle pain and tension, doctors administered 27 injections every three months.

In December 2016, Lombardo's parents elected to take her to St. Louis Children's Hospital in St. Louis, Missouri to undergo a selective dorsal rhizotomy surgery to potentially improve her ability to walk and to reduce pain. Lombardo did not qualify for the operation in Australia because she was too young. The cost of the surgery reached $100,000. Her recovery took three months, after which she began extensive courses of physiotherapy and hydrotherapy. At that time, she was also able to run with the help of a walker and was learning to walk with walking sticks.

In July 2018, Lombardo was taken to the BIOSS clinic in Monterrey, Mexico to undergo an experimental bone marrow stem cell surgery. For a month after the procedure, she underwent another round of extensive physiotherapy in Texas. She was also able to take her first independent steps during this time. She was profiled on an August 2018 episode of 60 Minutes. In December 2018, she was able to ride a modified bicycle from Queenscliff to Manly. In March 2019, a documentary film directed by Tim Skinner – The Unknown Upside, chronicled Lombardo's story, where she was screened for the first time.
