= Frank Lionel Watts =

Frank Lionel Watts, CMG, MBE, (1928–2000), known simply as Lionel Watts, was an Australian disability advocate and founder of Australian disability service provider, House with No Steps. House with No Steps is now known as Aruma.

In 1956, Watts contracted chronic bulbar poliomyelitis which left him with paraplegia.

== Career ==
Having been unable to re-enter the workforce after contracting polio, Watts formed the Wheelchair & Disabled Association of Australia in 1962, later renamed House with No Steps. Watts was the organisation's first president and later Executive Director.

Watt's early work with the organisation focused on establishing workshops which provided jobs for people with a disability, a wheelchair factory, and independent living accommodation.

In 1968, Watts was invited by U.S. President Richard Nixon to attend the President's Committee on Rehabilitation in Washington, D.C. He attended similar seminars on five other occasions over the next eight years.

In 1969, Watts was elected to the National Executive Committee of the Australian Council for the Rehabilitation of Disabled (ACROD), now known as National Disability Services (NDS).

In September 1970, Watts was elected Chairman of ACROD's Architectural Barriers Committee. As Chairman, Watts established committees in all states and headed deputations which led to the provision of amenities such as parking permits for people with a physical disability. In 1979, Watts was elected President of ACROD, the first person with a physical disability to hold this position.

Watts remained Executive Director of House with No Steps until 1989. After resigning, Watts still remained heavily involved with the organisation as an Executive Committee Member until his death.

Watts died September 2000 after a long illness. Watts was survived by his wife, Dorothy Watts, and two daughters.

== Awards and recognition ==
- In July 1965, the Warringah Shire Council named a 20-acre reserve located opposite the House with No Steps head office in Frenchs Forest, NSW, after Watts.
- In the 1968 New Year Honours, Watts was awarded a Member of the Most Excellent Order of the British Empire - Civil (MBE) in the Queen's New Year's Honours List for his work on physical disability.
- In the 1982 Birthday Honnours, Watts was appointed a Companion of the Order of St Michael and St George (CMG) for his work in rehabilitation.
