= Davidson, New South Wales =

Davidson
- Suburb
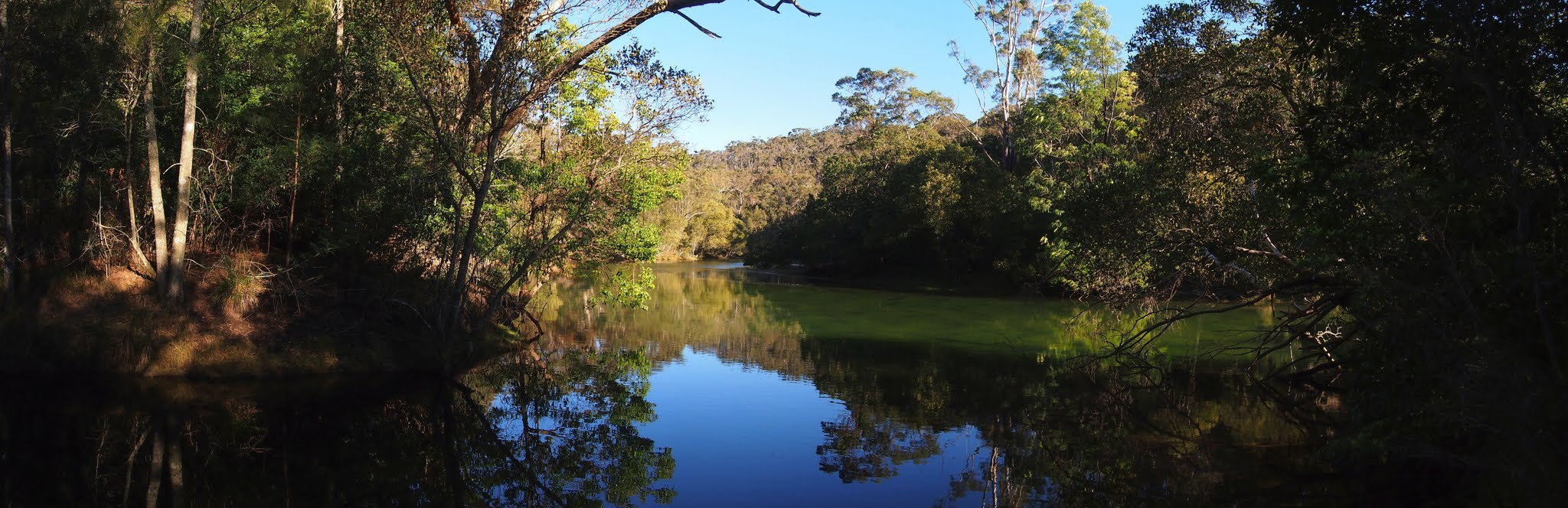
- Middle Harbour Track

- Interactive map of Davidson
- Country: Australia
- State: New South Wales
- City: Sydney
- LGA: Northern Beaches Council
- Location: 20 km (12 mi) north-east of Sydney CBD

Government
  - State electorate: Davidson
  - Federal division: Mackellar
- Elevation: 155 m (509 ft)

Population
  - Total: 2,725 (2021 census)
- Postcode: 2085
Suburbs around Davidson
St Ives	Belrose	Belrose
St Ives	Davidson	Frenchs Forest
East Killara	Forestville	Forestville

Davidson is a suburb on the Northern Beaches of Sydney, in the state of New South Wales, Australia. Davidson is located 20 kilometres north of the Sydney central business district, in the local government area of Northern Beaches Council. Davidson is part of the Forest District.

== Location ==
Davidson is adjacent to Belrose and Frenchs Forest and is located on the eastern edge of the Garigal National Park. Davidson is located approximately 15 kilometres (9.3 mi) from the Sydney CBD.

Davidson comprises part of the "Forest" area, which also encompasses the suburbs of Belrose, Frenchs Forest, Forestville, Killarney Heights, Terrey Hills and Duffys Forest. The Forest forms part of the Northern Beaches Council jurisdiction, which encompasses a large part of the Northern Beaches area of Sydney.

== History ==
Davidson was named for Sir Walter Davidson, Governor of New South Wales from 18 February 1918 to 4 September 1923. A park was dedicated in his honour in this area in 1923 and the developing suburb later took this name. Davidson began life as a mining quarry, with residential developments not beginning until the late 1970s.

The area faced a significant threat in January 1994 when bushfires in the Garigal National Park came dangerously close to the suburb. These fires were suppressed by the brigades of the Warringah/Pittwater Rural Fire Service from entering the Davidson Valley System.

== Geography ==
Davidson features uneven topography, in large part due to the area's origins as a mining quarry, as well as its proximity to Garigal National Park. Steep descents are evident in Stone Parade, Borgnis Street and Maitland Street, whereas more undulatory landscapes can be seen along parts of Prahran Avenue and Kambora Avenue.

The Eucalyptus trees and Liquidambars that line the streets of Davidson are home to large numbers of native birds such as Kookaburras, Galahs and Rainbow Lorikeets.

== Parks ==
Davidson has many parks. The suburb adjoins Garigal and Kur-ing-gai Chase National Parks; in addition, there are numerous other reserves including McFarlane Reserve, Maitland Street Reserve, Aranda Place Reserve and Richard Healy Oval.

== Education ==
Davidson is home to two primary schools:

- Kambora Public School
- St Martin De Porres Catholic Primary School

Davidson High School is named for the suburb, but is located in neighbouring suburb Frenchs Forest.

== Commercial and Fire Brigade ==
A shopping complex on the corner of Yindela Street and Pound Avenue contains a small number of commercial premises, including a popular café, a hairdressers salon and a sports injury clinic. The complex also contains the only apartment accommodation in the suburb.

Davidson is also home to the Davidson Rural Fire Brigade since the station relocated from Cannons Parade Forestville in 1976. The Station has approximately 110 members, including former Australian Prime Minister Tony Abbott, and is one of 13 Brigades in the Warringah/Pittwater District of the New South Wales Rural Fire Service (RFS).

On 2 October 2013 a small bush fire swept through the national park in the area behind Maitland Street and Cambage Court, Frenchs Forest. No homes were directly threatened due to the fast action of the RFS. Ultimately, the fire was contained without any loss of property.

== Population ==
At the 2021 census, there were 2,725 residents in Davidson. The most common ancestries in Davidson were English 49.2%, Australian 31.9%, Irish 13.6%, Scottish 11.3% and Chinese 4.7%. 69.2% of people were born in Australia. The next most common country of birth was England at 10.7%. 86.7% of people only spoke English at home. The most common responses for religion were No Religion 43.7%, Catholic 22.8% and Anglican 17.9%.

The median weekly household income in Davidson was $3,254, higher than the national median of $1,746. In Davidson, the majority of the dwellings are separate houses (98.2%), with a total of just 12 properties that were semi-detached or units.

== Notable residents ==
- Michael Hutchence – Former frontman of the Australian band INXS
- Matt Shirvington – Olympic athlete, sprinter and television news presenter
- Peter Hardcastle – Olympic level athlete, rowing, three time Olympian 2000, 2004 & 2008
- Robert Lee – Mythbusters narrator

== Culture ==
Davidson garners attention each December for its residents' enthusiastic display of Christmas lights. The "Davidson Lights" draw families from all over Sydney. Borgnis Street provides the centre of the nightly celebrations in the lead-up to Christmas, however the festive spirit is spread widely throughout the suburb with residents of Stone Parade and its various cul-de-sacs also actively participating.

== Transport ==
Davidson's mode of public transport is solely operated by bus services operated by CDC NSW. The bus routes go throughout the suburb regularly with routes straight to the City and Chatswood, while residents who want to go Manly can do so by catching any bus that would take them to Forestway, where they can get a transfer.
