= Covenant Christian School, Sydney =

Covenant Christian School

Location
- Belrose, Northern Beaches, Sydney, New South Wales; Australia; 33°42′49″S 151°12′55″E

Information
- Type: Independent co-educational early learning, primary and secondary day school
- Motto: All knowledge through Christ
- Denomination: Non-denominational Christian
- Established: 1978; 48 years ago
- Educational authority: NSW Department of Education
- Principal: Melissa Brown
- Years: Early learning and K–12
- Enrolment: 880 (2017 K–12)
- Athletics: Christian Schools Sporting Association
- Affiliations: Christian Education National; Combined Independent Schools
- Website: www.covenant.nsw.edu.au

Covenant Christian School is an independent non-denominational Christian co-educational early learning, primary and secondary day school, located in Belrose on the Northern Beaches of Sydney, New South Wales, Australia. The school was established in 1978 and delivers a general and religious education to approximately 850 children from early learning through Kindergarten to Year 12.

The school is a member of Christian Education National (formerly Christian Parents Controlled Schools). The school is also a member of the Christian Schools Sporting Association (CSSA) and the Combined Independent Schools (CIS).

== History ==
The founders of Covenant Christian School wanted an education for their children which was explicitly Christian in perspective. A group of Christians began to discuss starting a Christian School in 1965 and in 1966 bought land at Ingleside to establish a school. From 1970 to 1973 various development applications were refused by the local council. In 1975 the school applied to Council to start in a demountable building. In 1977 a decision was made to start in a church hall while continuing to look for a suitable location.

Classes started 29 May 1978 at St Paul's Anglican Church, Terrey Hills, with one teacher and 19 children from Kindergarten to Year 5. In September 1978 the property at 212 Forest Way was purchased. In 1979 Primary education started in a Cottage at 212 Forest Way and Infants remained in St Paul's Church hall at Terrey Hills. In 1980 the K-7 school was operating at Forest Way. The first student sat for their Year 10 School Certificate in 1983. In 1986 the first student attempted the NSW Higher School Certificate.

An early learning centre was introduced in 2006, and by 2017 Covenant had grown to 880 students.

In 2021, the school was reported to have fired a teacher for not affirming the school's position against homosexuality, with the school releasing a statement about their right to take such an action.

== House teams ==
- White (Yellow) Named after Paul White
- Alyward (Blue) Named after Gladys Aylward
- Ten Boom (Green) Named after Corrie ten Boom
- Lewis (Red) Named after C.S. Lewis

== See also ==
- List of non-government schools in New South Wales
