= Elanora Heights =

- Suburb
- Interactive map of Elanora Heights
- Country: Australia
- State: New South Wales
- City: Sydney
- LGA: Northern Beaches Council
- Location: 27 km (17 mi) north-east of Sydney CBD

Government
  - State electorate: Pittwater
  - Federal division: Mackellar
- Elevation: 84 m (276 ft)

Population
  - Total: 4,581 (2021 census)
- Postcode: 2101
Suburbs around Elanora Heights
| Ingleside | | Warriewood |
| Garigal NP | Elanora Heights | North Narrabeen |
| | Narrabeen Lagoon |

Elanora Heights is a suburb in northern Sydney, in the state of New South Wales, Australia. Elanora Heights is 27 kilometres north-east of the Sydney central business district, in the local government area of Northern Beaches Council. Elanora Heights is part of the Northern Beaches region.

== Location ==
Elanora Heights is on the hill above Narrabeen, overlooking Narrabeen Lagoon and the Tasman Sea. The northern side lies next to bushland, which runs to Ku-ring-gai Chase National Park, and the south-western side adjoins Garigal National Park. Native wildlife is common in the area, with bandicoots, blue tongue lizards, possums and many birds being seen. A rare quoll has been found in the suburb in recent years, and rock wallaby are commonly seen on the course at Elanora Country Club. Elanora Heights is home to some of the largest homes in Pittwater and is a popular tourist destination spot.

== Landmarks ==
Elanora Heights is a mainly residential suburb, with a few small shops and two golf courses: Elanora Country Club and Monash. The Uniting Church runs a conference centre set in the bushland.

== History ==
Elanora Heights is derived from an Aboriginal word meaning "home by the sea" or "home by the water" and the word Heights meaning "Up high". Elanora Heights takes its name from the geographical location, on the hill near the lagoon.

The suburb came into existence as the Elanora Heights Estate in 1929. Earlier settlements had taken the form of an attempted coal mining camp. Members of Royal Sydney Golf Club purchased a large parcel of land about 1920 which laid the basis for Elanora Country Club which opened in 1922. The name was abbreviated to Elanora in the late 20th century, however the old name has continued to be used.

== Population ==
In the 2021 Census, there were 4,581 people in Elanora Heights. 77.3% of people were born in Australia. The next most common country of birth was England at 6.9%. 89.3% of people spoke only English at home. The most common responses for religion were No Religion 41.3%, Catholic 25.5% and Anglican 15.3%.
