= Belrose, New South Wales =

Belrose
- Suburb
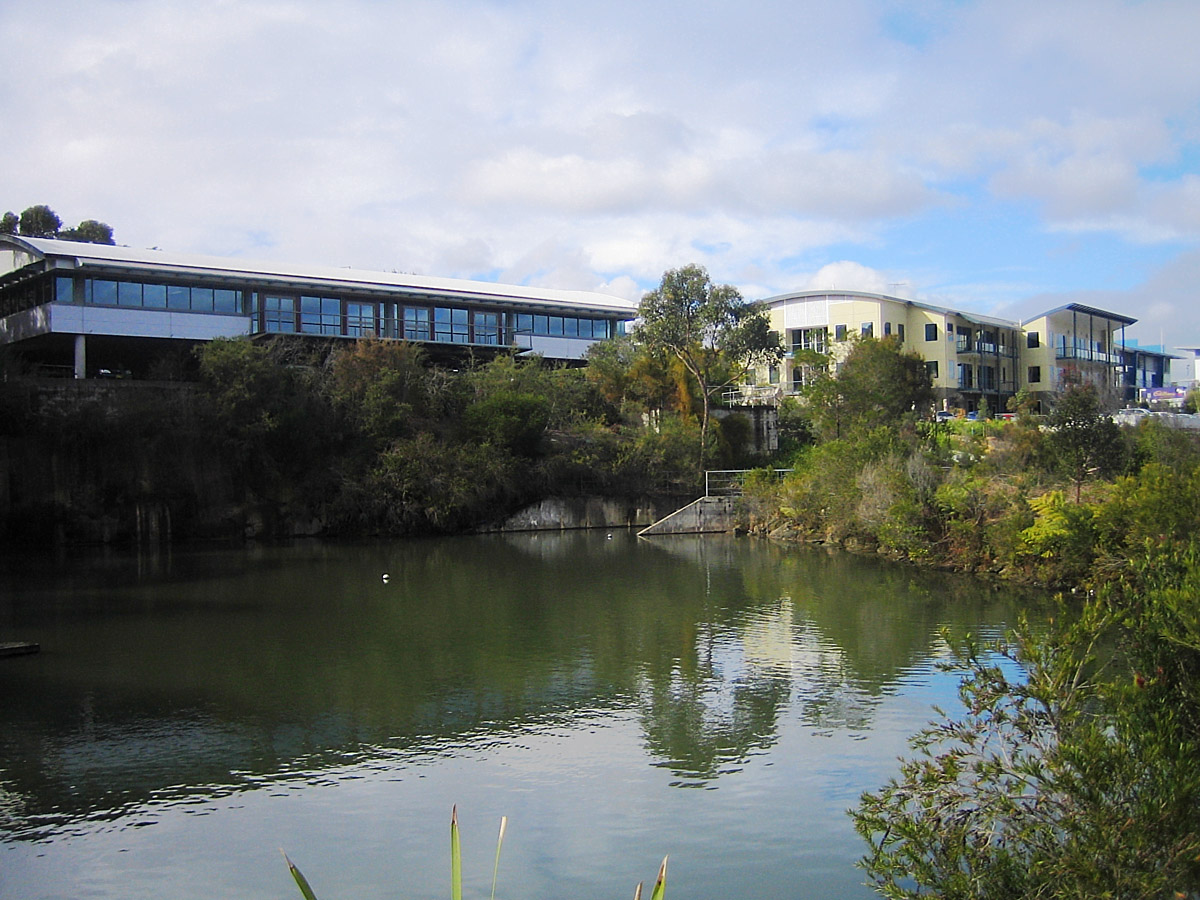
- Austlink Business Park

- Interactive map of Belrose
- Country: Australia
- State: New South Wales
- City: Sydney
- LGA: Northern Beaches Council
- Location: 19 km (12 mi) north-east of Sydney CBD

Government
  - State electorates: Davidson; Pittwater; Wakehurst
  - Federal division: Mackellar
- Elevation: 171 m (561 ft)

Population
  - Total: 8,726 (2021 census)
- Postcode: 2085
Suburbs around Belrose
Terrey Hills	Ingleside	Elanora Heights
St Ives	Belrose	Cromer Narrabeen
Davidson	Frenchs Forest Forestville	Oxford Falls

Belrose is a suburb of Sydney in the state of New South Wales, Australia 19 kilometres north-east of the Sydney central business district in the local government area of Northern Beaches Council. Belrose is also considered to be part of the Forest District, colloquially known as The Forest.

== History ==
Belrose Post Office opened on 4 September 1923 and closed in 1986. Belrose West Post Office opened on 1 July 1969.

The name 'Belrose' is said to be derived from the combination of two plant names – the Christmas Bell and the bush rose, which were predominant in the area.

== Demographics ==
According to the 2021 census of Population, there were 8,726 residents in Belrose. 69.9% of people were born in Australia. The next most common countries of birth were England 7.0%, South Africa 2.7%, China 2.4% and New Zealand 1.7%. 81.8% of people only spoke English at home. Other languages spoken at home included Armenian 3.0% and Mandarin 2.5%. The most common responses for religious affiliation were No Religion 34.7%, Catholic 22.9% and Anglican 18.8%.

== Commercial area ==
Belrose is primarily a residential area, but contains the Austlink Business Park, two shopping centres including Glenrose Village Shopping Centre (formerly Stockland Glenrose). Belrose also has Glen Street theatre, and Belrose library.

There is also a Homemakers Supacenta with over 35 shops including established retailers such as Harvey Norman, Nick Scali Furniture, and JB Hi-Fi. Adjacent to the Supacenta in the Northern side of the suburb, there is also a Bunnings Warehouse store. This region is collectively identified as the Belrose business park.

Optus satellite communications facility is located in Belrose, where Optus manages its five satellites currently in orbit.

== Schools ==
Belrose is home to a number of schools:

- Belrose Public School
- Wakehurst Public School
- Covenant Christian School
- Kamaroi Rudolf Steiner School
- John Colet School
- Yanginanook School

== Parks, sport and recreation ==
Garigal National Park and Ku-ring-gai Chase National Park are on the northern border.

Playing fields in Belrose include the Lionel Watts Oval, a sporting ground for children, and Frenchs Forest Showground, both on the border with Frenchs Forest.

BTH Raiders is the local soccer club, encompassing Belrose and Terrey Hills. The main oval is Wyatt Oval, but BTH also uses Terrey Hills ovals. More than 900 players are in the local club with an over-35 competition.

The Belrose Eagles are a local rugby league team who play at Lionel Watts Reserve. They play in the Manly-Warringah District Rugby League.

Belrose is home to at least two sets of Tennis courts including; The Belrose Tennis club and Wyatt Reserve tennis courts.

Belrose is also home to the Belrose Bowling (lawn bowls) club.

Manly-Warringah Radio Society using callsign VK2MB is the local club for Amateur Radio Operators & services the Belrose area, with club rooms nearby at neighbouring Terrey Hills.

== Notable residents ==
- Phil Burton, musician
- Richard Gee, family court judge
- David Oldfield, Former politician, One Nation co-founder.
- Anna Wood, teenager who died after consuming an ecstasy tablet
