= Garigal National Park =

National park in Australia

- IUCN category II (national park)
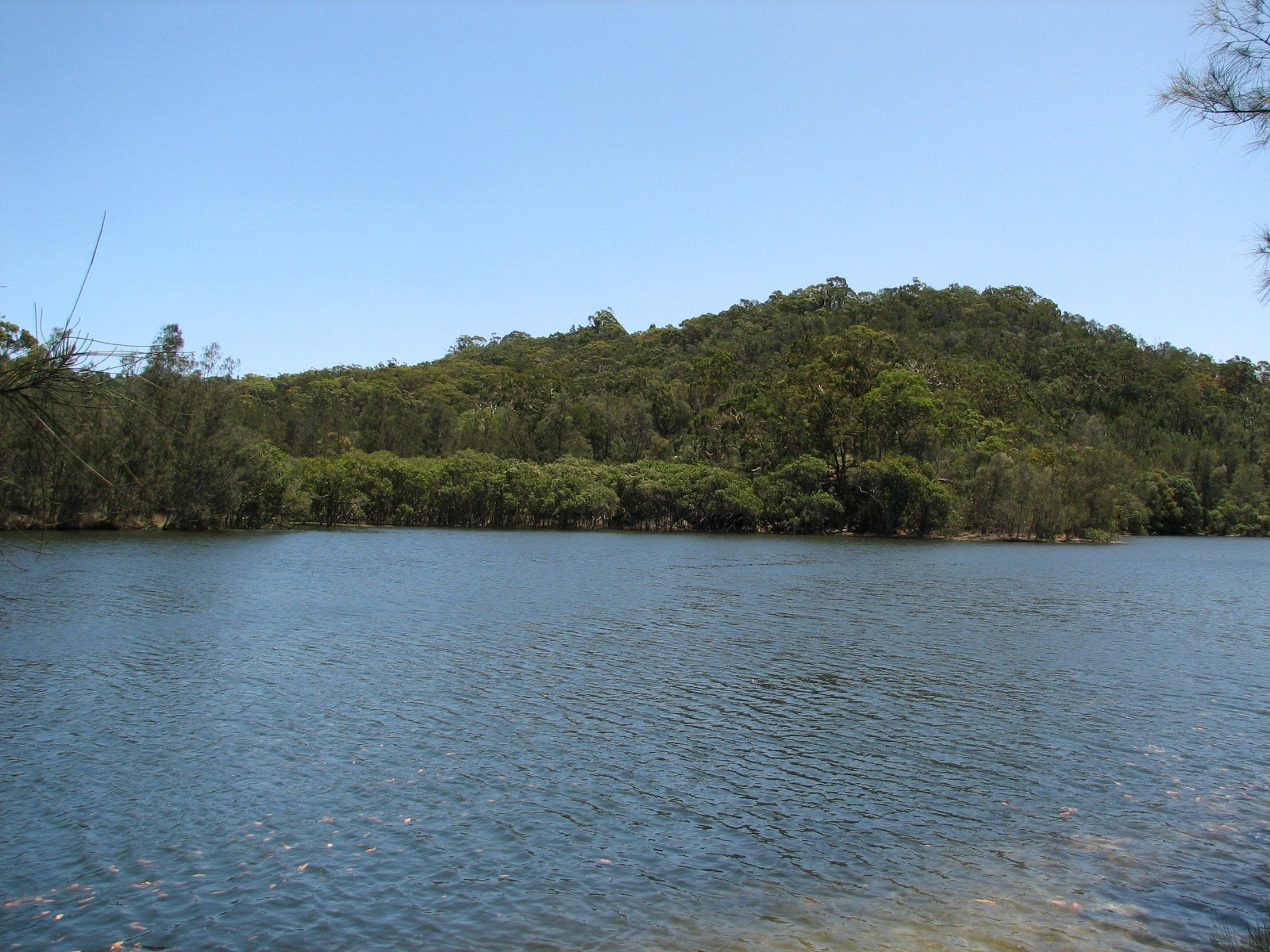
- View of the national park from Middle Harbour

- Location within New South Wales
- Location: New South Wales
- Nearest city: Sydney
- Area: 22.02 km^{2} (8.50 sq mi)
- Established: 19 April 1991
- Governing body: NSW National Parks & Wildlife Service
- Website: Official website

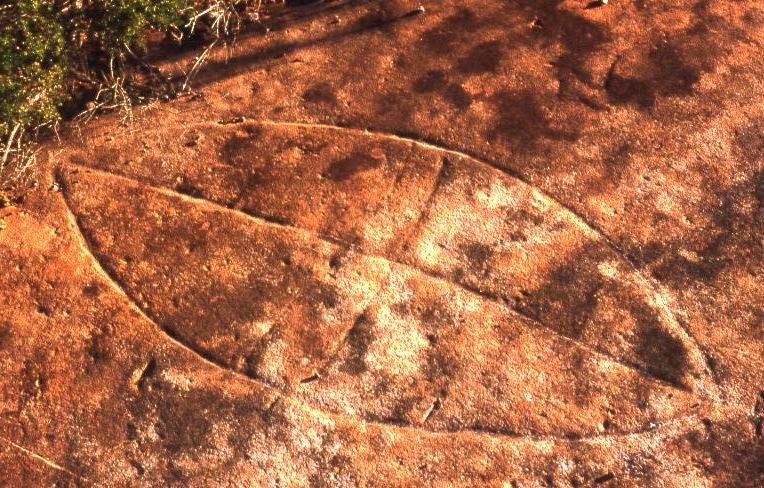
Aboriginal rock carving near Bantry Bay

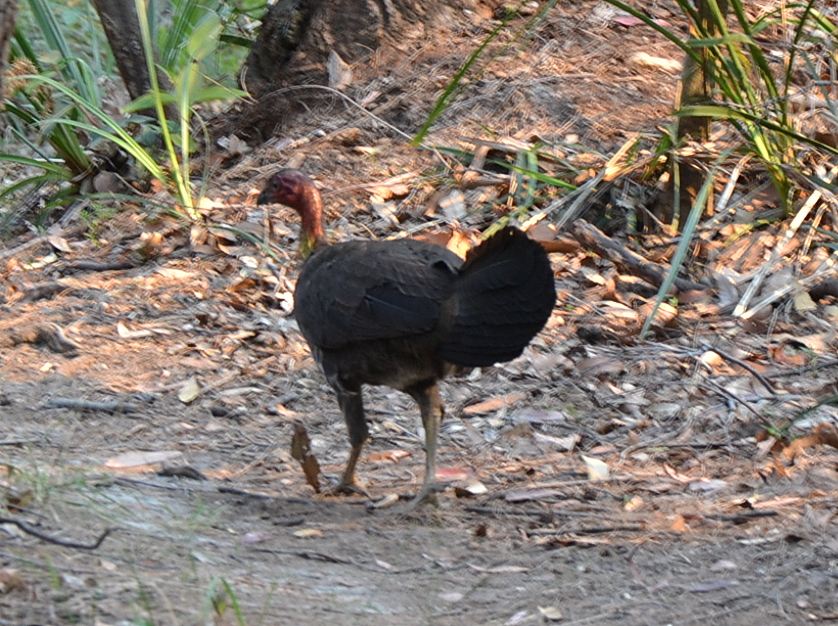
A Brushturkey in the bush west of Seaforth

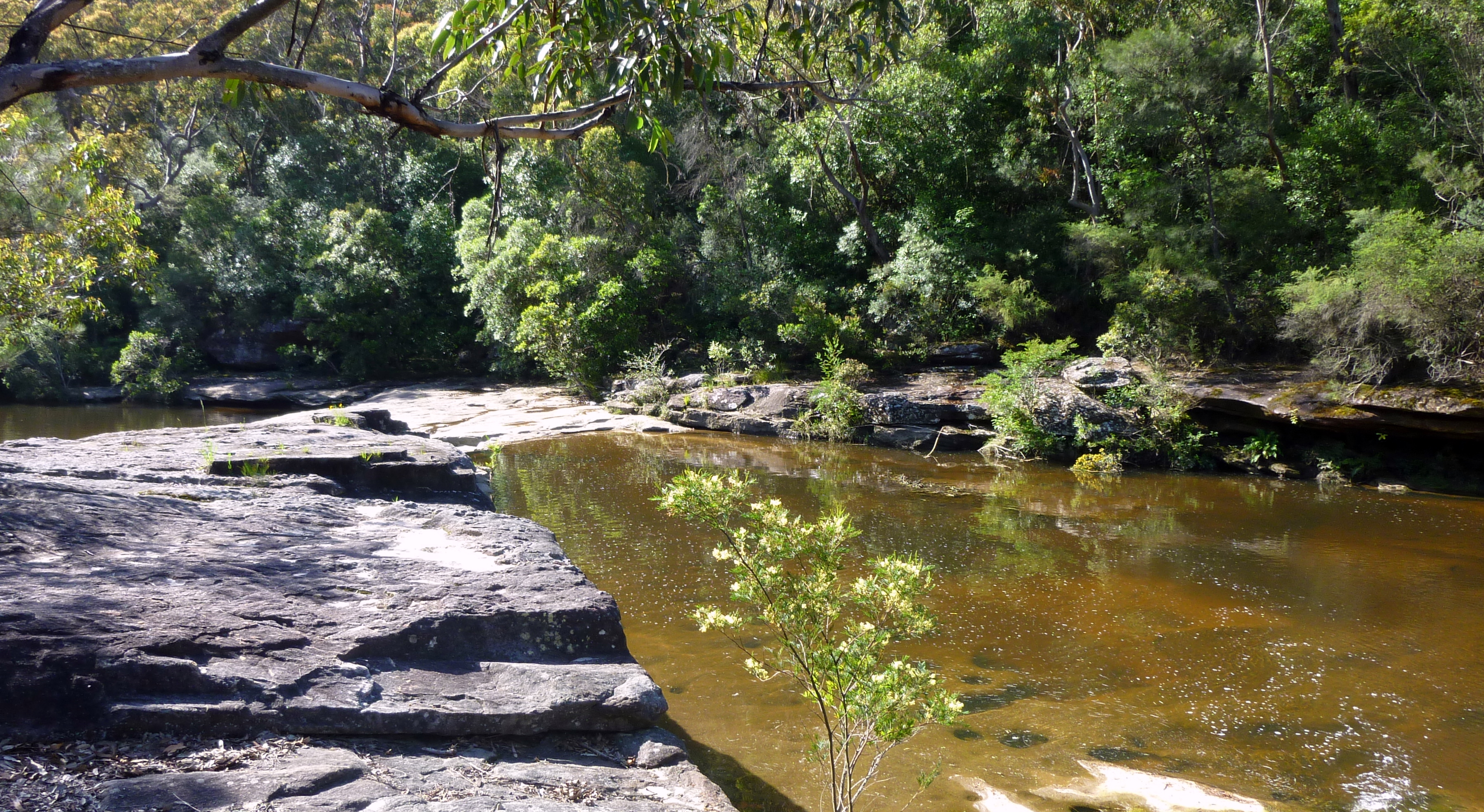
Creek in Garigal NP

The Garigal National Park is a protected national park that is located within the North Shore and Forest District regions of Sydney, New South Wales, in eastern Australia. The 2,202-hectare (5,440-acre) national park is situated approximately 20 kilometres (12 mi) north of the Sydney central business district.

Split into three distinct sections, divided by natural geography, urban development and road infrastructure, the park comprises the valley of Middle Harbour Creek and its tributaries, the slopes along the northern side of Middle Harbour as far as Bantry Bay and part of the catchment of Narrabeen Lakes.

The park trails are popular with bushwalkers and mountain bike riders, particularly between Belrose and St Ives in an area known as Cascades after the Cascades Track that runs through the area. There are over 35 trails in the park covering 120km, including both authorised bushwalking and mountain-biking trails, and unofficial or unsanctioned tracks.

== Etymology and indigenous heritage ==
The word Garigal is a derivation of the word Carigal or Caregal used to describe the Indigenous clan of Awabakal people who lived in the area.

There is considerable evidence of past Aboriginal activity in the area, with over 100 Aboriginal sites recorded to date, including shelters, cave art, rock engravings, middens, grinding grooves and a possible stone arrangement.

== Location ==
Much of the park is bounded by residential development along the ridge tops and it is easily accessible at numerous points by road and water. Several other conservation reserves and areas of bushland are adjacent or close by the Garigal National Park, including the Ku-ring-gai Chase National Park, the Sydney Harbour National Park, the Manly Warringah War Memorial Park (commonly known as the Manly Dam Reserve) and a number of areas of Crown land and other reserves in Northern Beaches, Ku-ring-gai and Willoughby local government areas.

The national park is defined by the following boundaries

- In the north–eastern sector – To the south of both the Mona Vale Road and the Belrose Waste Management Centre; as far east as Elanora Heights, Ingleside and the Narrabeen Lakes.
- In the south–western sector – Along Middle Harbour and Middle Harbour Creek and bounded to the west by Killarney Heights, Forestville, Frenchs Forest, Davidson, Belrose; bounded to the east by East Lindfield, East Killara, St Ives; as far north as Mona Vale Road where it abuts the Ku-ring-gai Chase National Park.
- In the south–eastern sector – Surrounding Bantry Bay between Killarney Heights and Forestville to the west; and Wakehurst Parkway and the Manly Dam Reserve to the east.

== Features ==
=== Fauna ===
A Dry Sclerophyll Forest, Garigal National Park is home to a wide range of fauna, including birds, snakes and a wide range of native mammals (such as bandicoots, koalas, wallabies).

There is also a number of introduced pests, including rabbits and foxes.

== Gallery ==
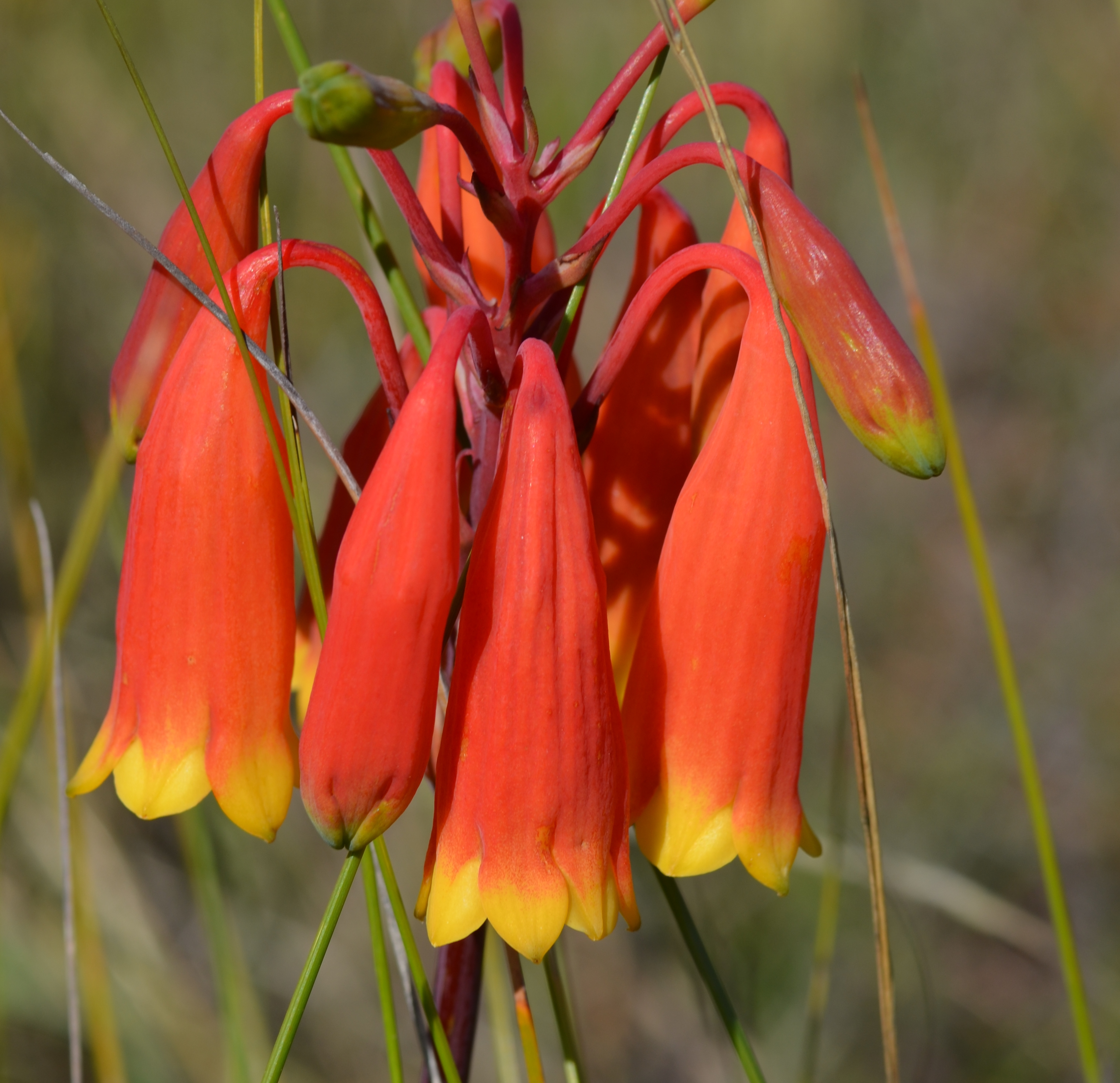
Blandfordia grandiflora

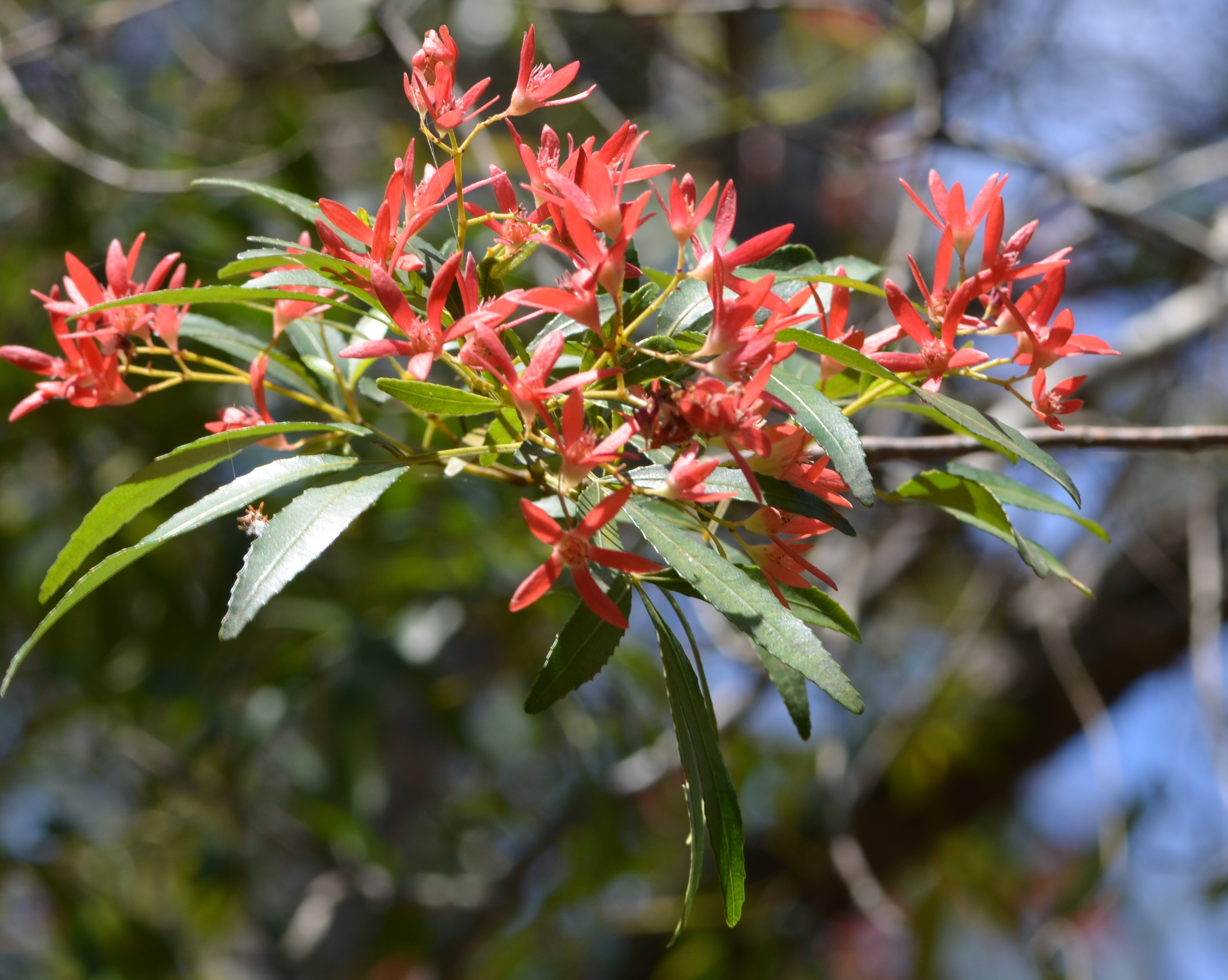
Ceratopetalum gummiferum

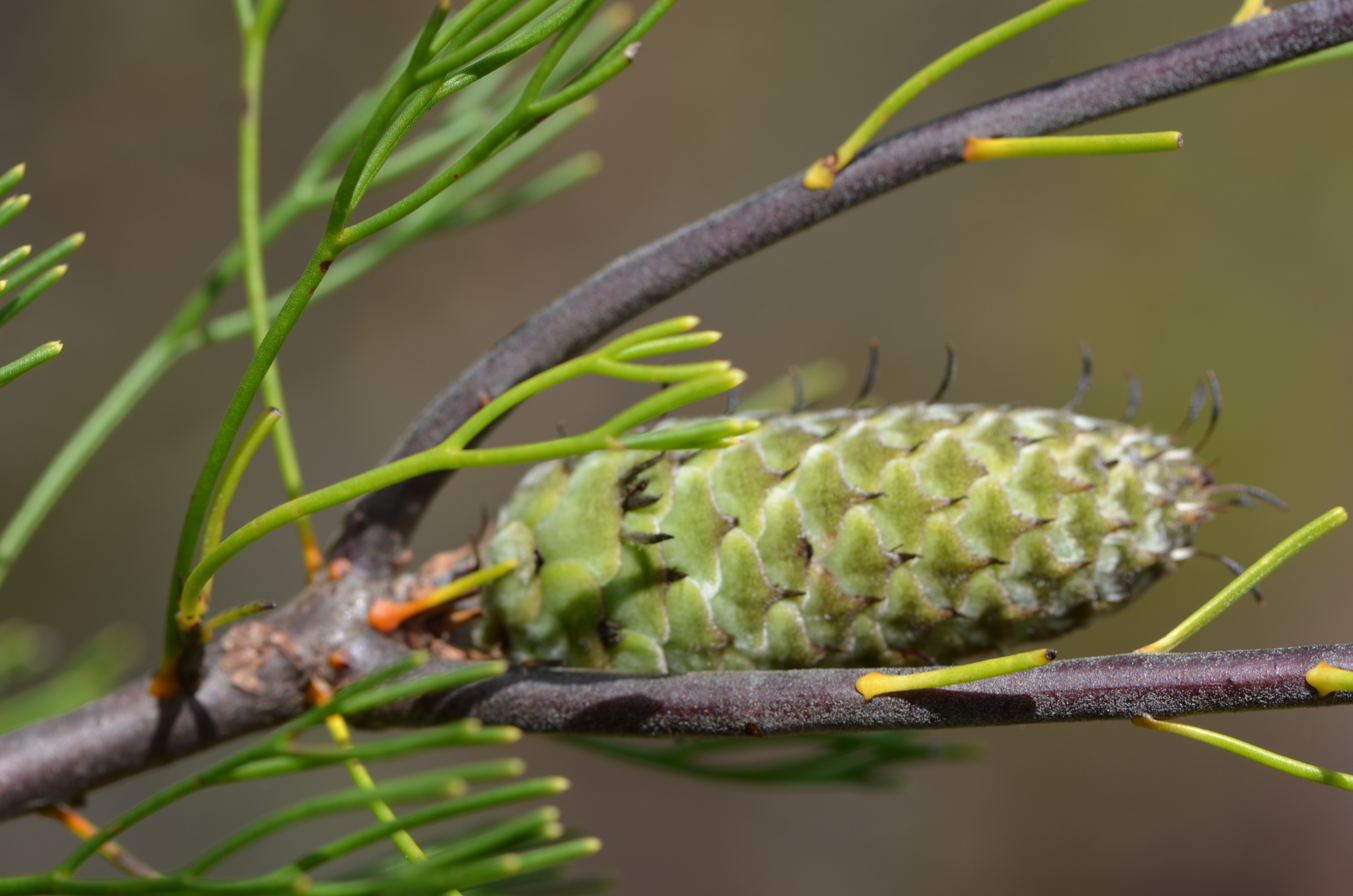
Petrophile pulchella

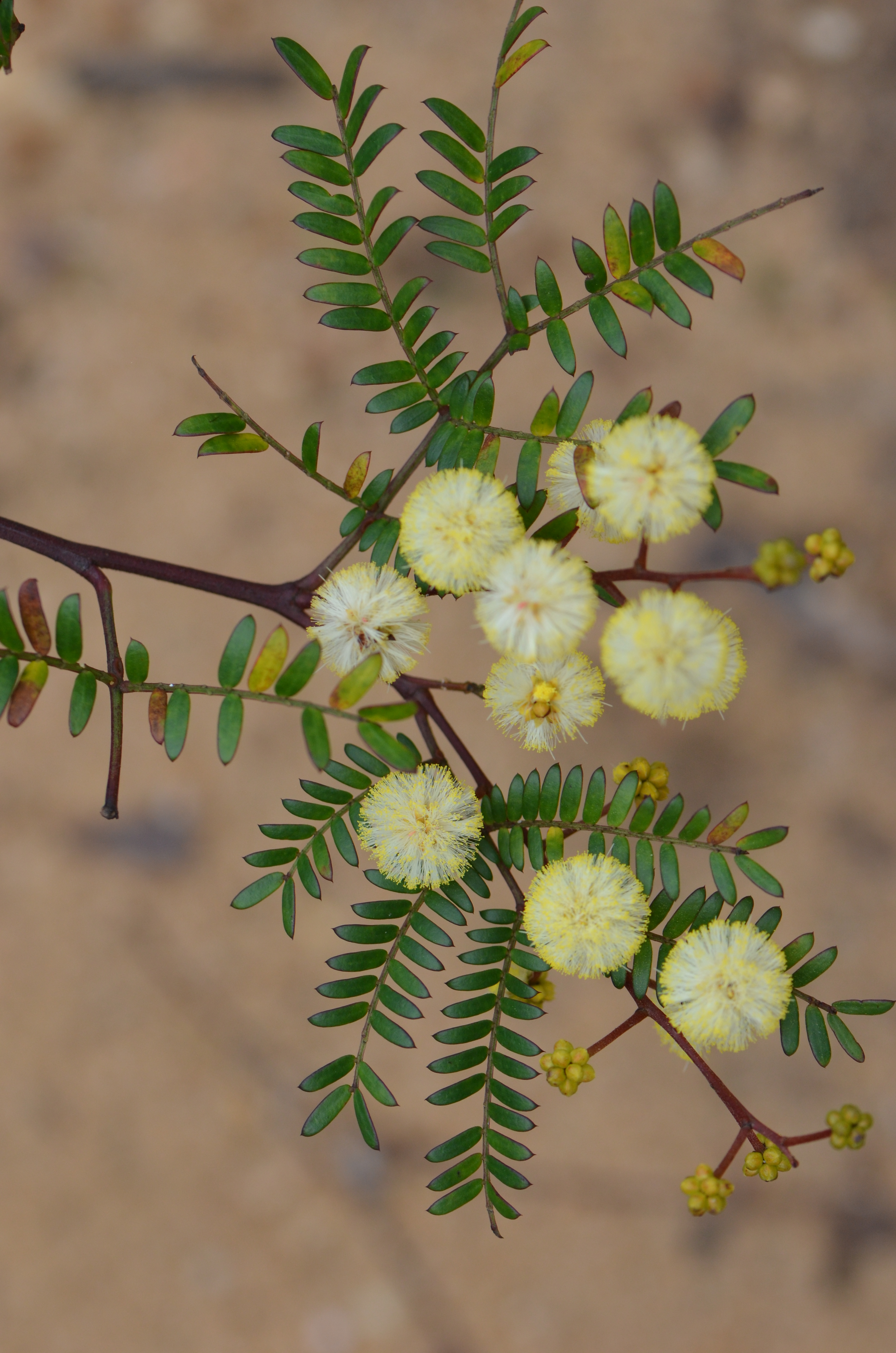
Acacia terminalis

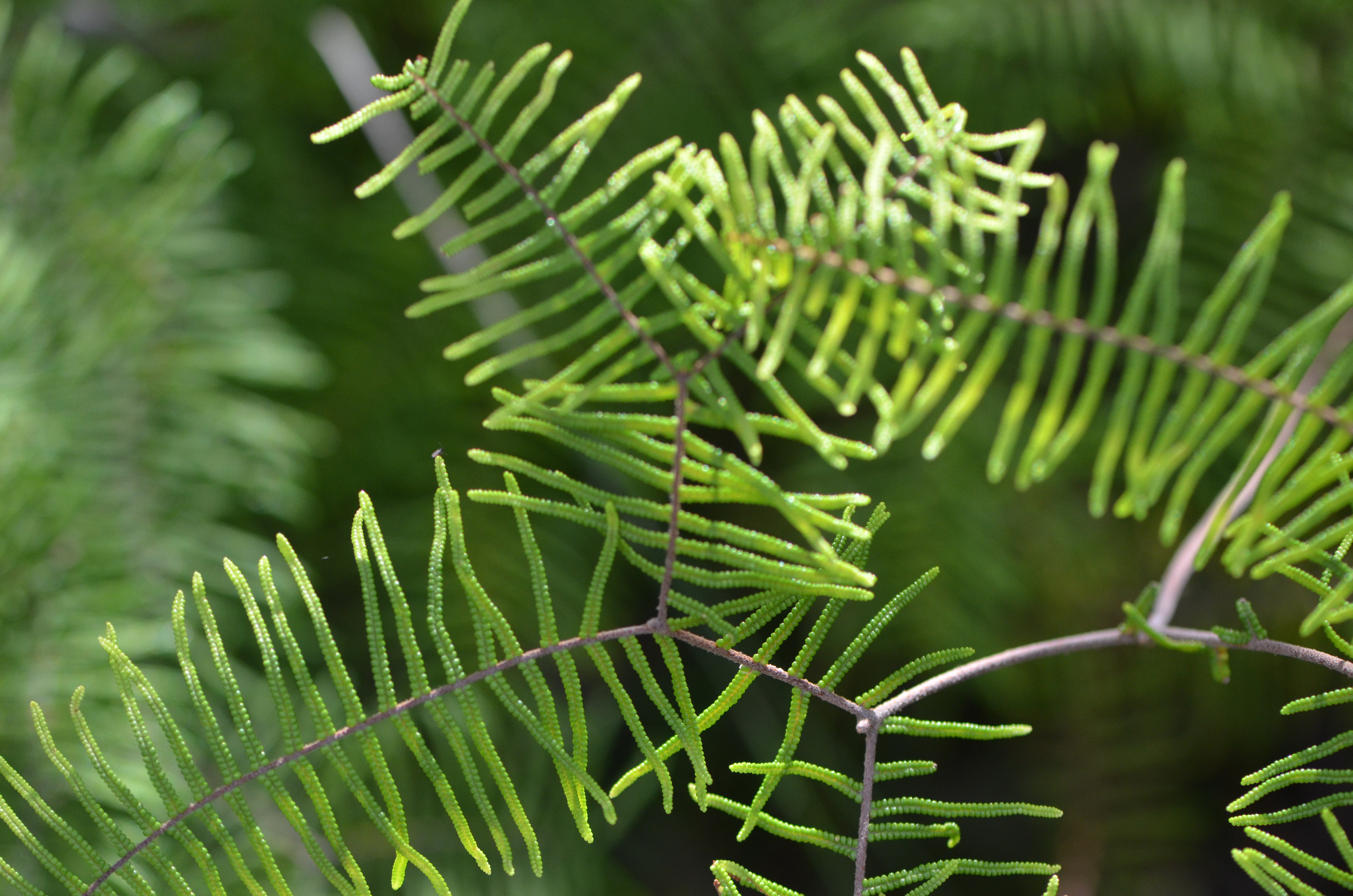
Gleichenia dicarpa

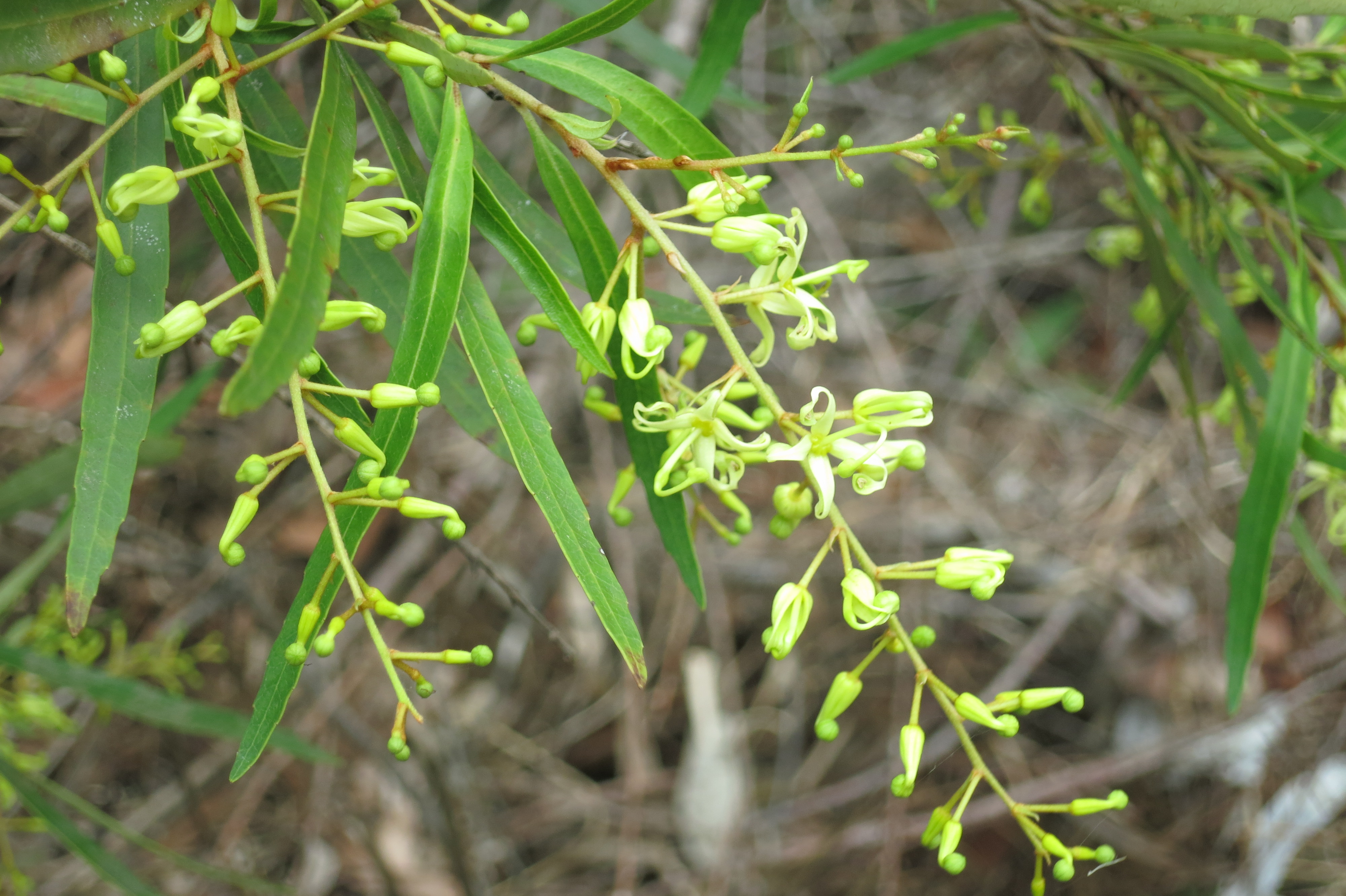
Lomatia myricoides

== See also ==
- Protected areas of New South Wales
