= Bantry Bay (New South Wales) =

Bight in Australia

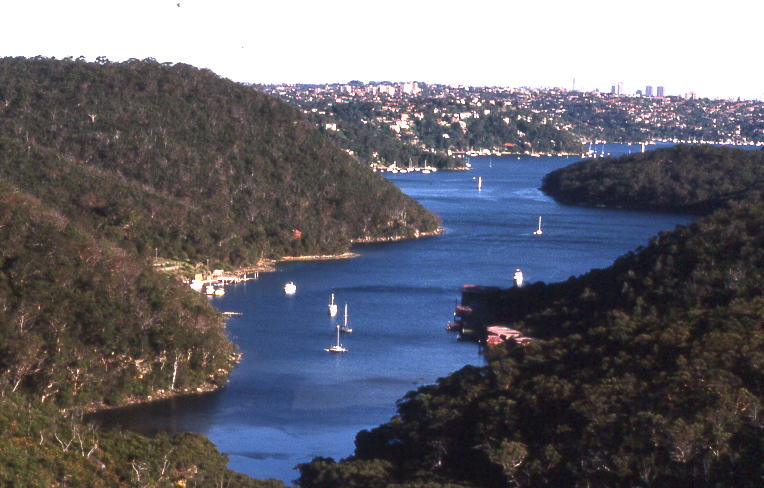
- Bantry Bay seen from the bluff at the northern end of the bay.

- Location of Bantry Bay in New South Wales
- Location: Northern Sydney, New South Wales
- Coordinates: 33°46′55″S 151°13′04″E
- Primary outflows: Middle Harbour, Port Jackson
- Basin countries: Australia

Bantry Bay is a bay located in the Garigal National Park in Middle Harbour within Sydney Harbour, in New South Wales, Australia. The local Bluff Track starts at the end of Grattan Crescent Frenchs Forest. There is a steep walk down to a wharf on the bay. It was named after Bantry Bay in Ireland.

== History and description ==
Aboriginal occupation of the area is evident through the abundance of middens along the foreshore.

The Warringah Shire Council minutes of 4 January 1907 reveal how unpopular was the government's proposal to take over Bantry Bay, which was a popular recreation area for many residents of Sydney, and had been visited regularly by day trippers since the 1840s, but by 1910 work on the construction of the new explosives magazines at Bantry Bay had commenced.

Bantry Bay was used to store military explosives. The storage complex consisted of nine explosives magazines which replaced old hulks that had been used to store explosives in nearby Powder Hulk Bay on Sydney Harbour. In 1915 the works were handed over to the state Explosives Department, which regulated the explosives industry in NSW. In 1973 operations at Bantry Bay were discontinued and the facility was closed.

The estuary is known to be a habitat for bull sharks, and two fatal shark attacks occurred in the bay in 1942.

The NSW National Parks and Wildlife Service currently maintains the site and in 2003 announced it would invest A$350,000 in restoring the ageing roofing. As of 2006 the site remained closed to the public due to old explosive contamination at the site. However, there are good views of the site from the eastern side of Bantry Bay, which can be accessed from the Timbergetter's track, which starts at Seaforth Oval. Walking tracks also go around the west side of the magazines, providing access from the nearby residential area of Killarney Heights.

Prior to the creation of Garigal National Park, the area had been preserved for some time as a reserve of 250 hectares (620 acres), which was listed on the Register of the National Estate.
