= B-Line (Sydney) =

Bus service in the Northern Beaches of Sydney

B1

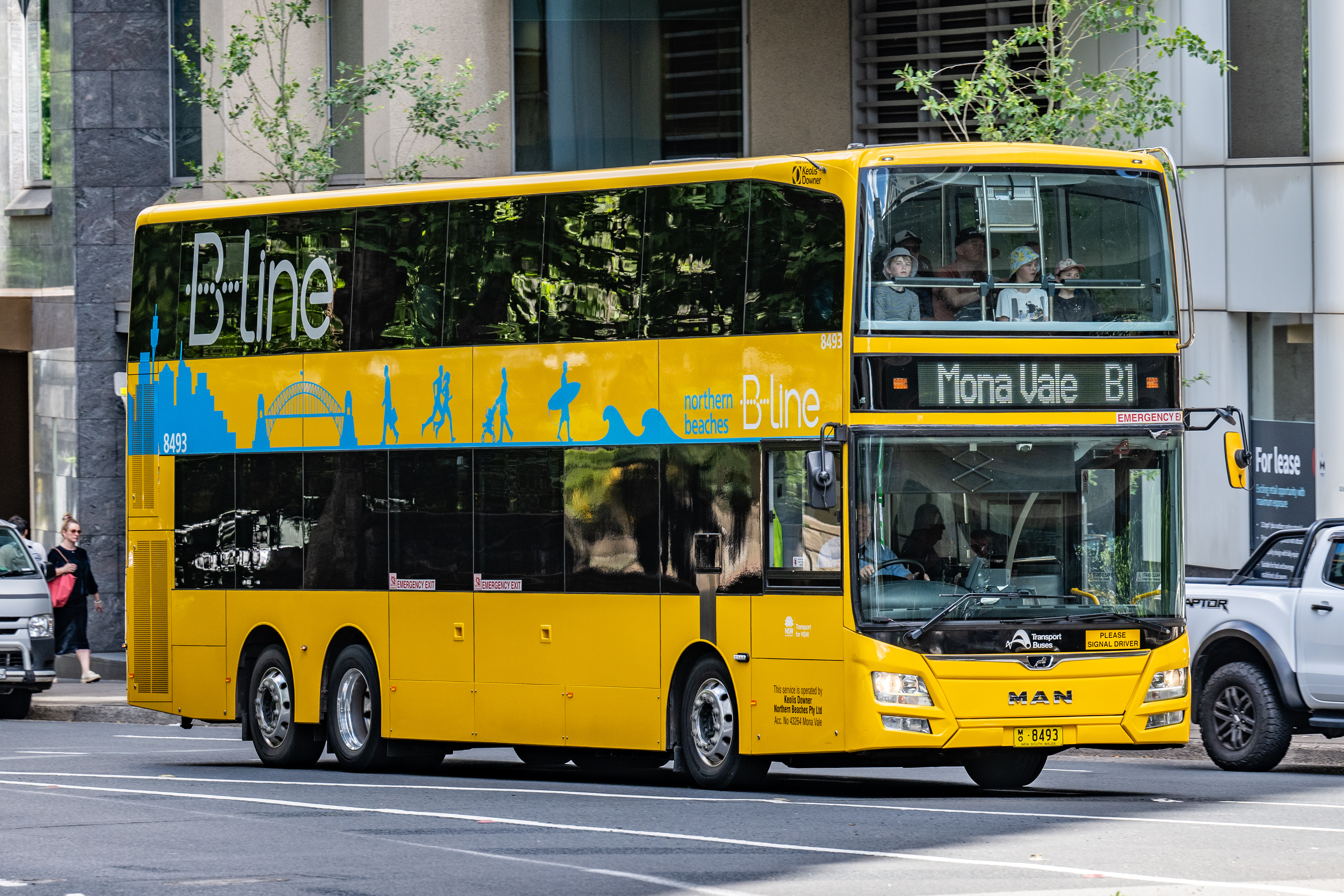
- Gemilang bodied MAN A95 on Clarence Street

Overview
- Operator: Keolis Downer Northern Beaches
- Garage: Mona Vale
- Vehicle: Gemilang Coachworks bodied MAN A95s
- Began service: 26 November 2017
- Predecessors: 190
- Former operator: State Transit
- Night-time: BN1

Route
- Locale: Sydney, Australia
- Start: Mona Vale
- Via: Warriewood; Narrabeen; Collaroy; Dee Why; Brookvale; Manly Vale; Spit Junction; Neutral Bay
- End: Wynyard Park
- Length: 31 kilometres (19 mi)
- Stops: 10

Service
- Level: Daily
- Frequency: 3-4 minutes (peak); 7-10 minutes (off-peak); 30 minutes (night)
- Journey time: 65 minutes
- Annual patronage: 5.9 million (2018)
- Timetable: Transport for NSW

The B-Line is a high-frequency bus route operated by Keolis Downer Northern Beaches between Wynyard Station in Sydney's central business district and the Northern Beaches region. It is a part of the Sydney suburban bus network.

== History ==
In November 2015, Transport for New South Wales (TfNSW) announced the construction of a 27 kilometre bus rapid transit network between Newport on the Northern Beaches and the Sydney central business district. It began operating on 26 November 2017 as route B1 between Mona Vale and Wynyard Park. A planned extension to Newport was later cancelled following opposition from local residents with concerns that improved public transport infrastructure would be used to justify new high density housing developments. The route is operated by double deck buses.

Route B1 services stop at nine B-Line stops at Mona Vale, Warriewood, Narrabeen, Collaroy, Dee Why, Brookvale, Manly Vale, Spit Junction and Neutral Bay. Commuter car parks have been built at Mona Vale, Warriewood, Narrabeen, Dee Why, Brookvale and Manly Vale.

The B-Line is operated by Keolis Downer Northern Beaches's Mona Vale depot as part of Region 8.

Buses on the B-Line trial Mobileye, a new forward-facing collision avoidance technology system which has been developed by Intel.

In the first year of operation to November 2018, 5.9 million passengers were carried.

On 20 December 2020, the B-Line commenced operating 24-hours a day, extended between midnight and 5am to the Queen Victoria Building as route BN1. In October 2021 it was included in the takeover of region 8 by Keolis Downer Northern Beaches.

Due to a shortage of drivers, severe cancellations and wait times are commonplace on the route.

Concerns have been raised about wear and tear on buses serving the route, most of which are travelling over 100,000 km annually. It was later announced in March 2025 that there will be additional 10 buses to be added in the fleet to address these concerns. The new fleet will expect to be delivered by mid 2026.

== Changes to Northern Beaches bus network ==
When the B-line opened, there were various changes to the bus network on the Northern Beaches. The more significant changes were:

- Discontinuation of 23 routes such as E84, E86, E87, E88, L84, L85, L87, L88, 130, 140, 153, 179, 187 and 190
- Introduction of 4 new routes in addition to route B1
- Reduction of service times and frequency to L90
- Extension of M30 from Spit Junction to Taronga Zoo, replacing daytime route 247 services
- Renumbering non-discontinued L routes to E routes

== Vehicles ==
To operate the B-Line, 38 Gemilang Coachworks bodied MAN A95s were purchased. 4 additional vehicles have since been added to the fleet, making up a total of 42 double decker vehicles utilised for the service. They have audio/video systems on board that announce the next stops, along with connections and places of interest at the stop. The buses have free double USB charging points per pair of seats. Painted in a dedicated yellow and blue livery, these are the first double deck buses to be operated by a NSW government operator since the Urban Transit Authority withdrew its last Leyland Atlanteans in 1986.

== Stops ==
All B-Line bus stops incorporate a real-time passenger information system that displays the departure time, destination, route number and number of passengers on board the next few buses to arrive at the stop (including non B-Line services).

=== Mona Vale ===
Mona Vale is the northern terminus of the line. The B-Line drops passengers off on Barrenjoey Road, between Pittwater Road and Park Street and picks up passengers on Barrenjoey Road, near Kitchener Park. Commuters can change here for bus services towards Macquarie Centre, Gordon, Terrey Hills, McCarrs Creek and Palm Beach. A commuter car park is available at this stop.

=== Warriewood ===
The Warriewood citybound bus stop is located on Pittwater Road, adjacent to North Narrabeen Reserve. The northbound bus stop is located on Pittwater Road, north of Jacksons Road, with access to Boondah Reserve. A commuter car park is available at this stop.

=== Narrabeen ===
The Narrabeen citybound bus stop is located on Pittwater Road, between Waterloo Street and Albert Street. The northbound bus stop is located on Pittwater Road with access to Berry Reserve. A commuter car park is available at this stop.

=== Collaroy ===
The Collaroy citybound bus stop is located on Pittwater Road, alongside the historic Arlington Amusement Hall. The northbound bus stop is located on Pittwater Road, between Fielding Avenue and Collaroy Street.

=== Dee Why ===
The Dee Why citybound bus stop is located on Pittwater Road, between Howard Avenue and Oaks Avenue. The northbound bus stop is located on Pittwater Road, south of St David Avenue. Commuters can change here for bus services to Chatswood, Frenchs Forest, Cromer, Narraweena, Collaroy Plateau and Wheeler Heights. A commuter car park is available at this stop.

=== Warringah Mall (Brookvale) ===
The Warringah Mall citybound bus stop is located on Pittwater Road, north of William Street. The northbound bus stop is located on Pittwater Road, adjacent to Westfield Warringah Mall shopping centre. Commuters can change here for bus services towards Chatswood, Frenchs Forest and Manly. A commuter car park is available at this stop.

=== Manly Vale ===
The Manly Vale bus stop is located on Condamine Street north of Kenneth Road. The bus stops at Manly Vale feature weather protection. The bus stop also features one of the six new commuter car parks which have been planned for B-Line bus stops. The Manly Vale B-Line commuter car park consists of a three-stories structure which has 150 spaces and incorporates around 9000 plants in a breathing green wall, helping to reduce air pollutants for nearby residents.

=== Spit Junction (Mosman) ===
The Spit Junction citybound bus stop is located on a newly built pedestrian plaza on Clifford Street. This bus stop started operating concurrently with the B-Line, with the older bus stop located closer to the junction of Military Road and Spit Road being closed. To facilitate its construction, a disused Greater Union cinema was purchased and demolished. The northbound bus stop remains in the same location on Spit Road although, like all other stops, fitted with new seating and real-time passenger information displays.

=== Neutral Bay ===
The Neutral Bay citybound bus stop is located on Military Road between Rangers Road and Wycombe Road. Citybound B-Line buses depart from Stand A, along with all other citybound buses. Commuters can change here for bus services towards Chatswood, Royal North Shore Hospital, Sydenham, North Sydney and Milsons Point. The northbound bus stop is located between Young Street and Waters Road. Northbound B-Line buses depart from Stand E, along with all other Northern Beaches buses. Commuters can change here for buses towards Balmoral Beach, Taronga Zoo and Mosman Junction.

=== Wynyard ===
Wynyard Park is the southern terminus of the line. The B-Line drops off passengers on York Street and picks up passengers from Stand B on Carrington Street. This stop connects the B-Line to train services at Wynyard railway station.
