= SS Collaroy =

British cargo ship

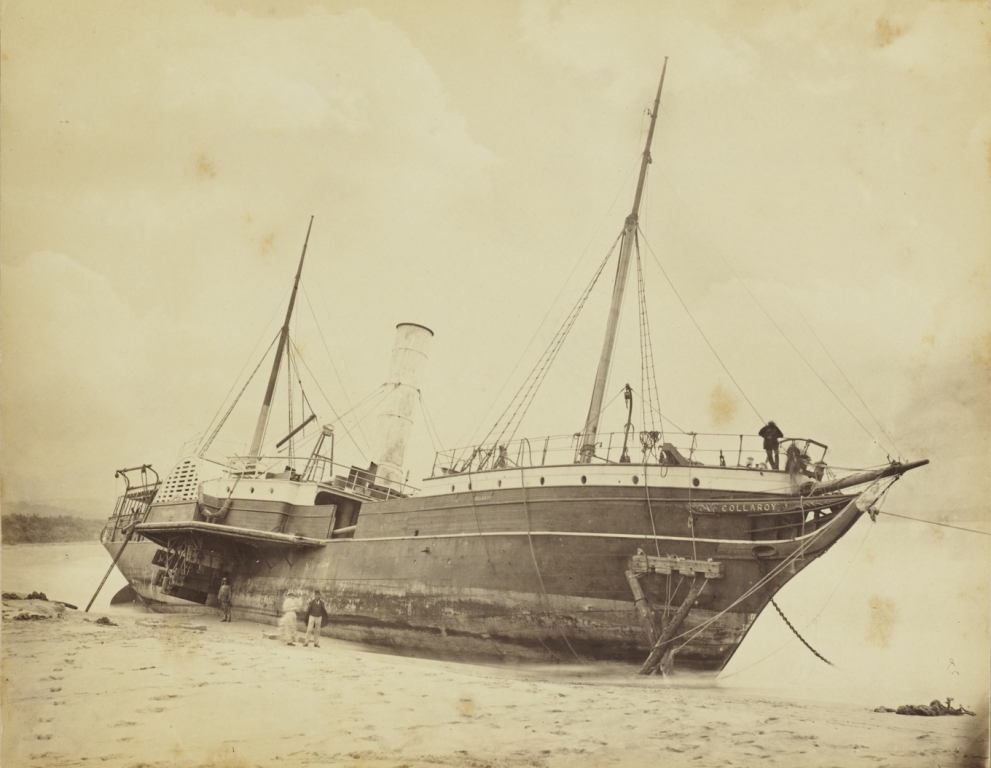
- SS Collaroy at Collaroy, New South Wales

History

Australia
- Owner: Hunter's River Steam Navigation Co.; Australasian SN Co.; Newcastle Steam Navigation Co. (Aus); John Robertson; Alexander Burns
- Builder: John Laird and son & Co. Birkenhead
- Launched: 1853
- Fate: Wrecked 1889
- Notes: location of stranding at Collaroy 33.733033°S 151.303365°E

General characteristics
- Class & type: coastal cargo
- Tons burthen: 419
- Length: 180.9 ft (55.1 m)
- Beam: 23.3 ft (7.1 m)
- Draught: 11.1 ft (3.4 m)
- Propulsion: engine manufactured by Fawcett, Preston and co
- Sail plan: barkentine
- Complement: 10

SS Collaroy was an iron paddle steamer which often travelled between Newcastle and Sydney. The ship was named after a sheep station near Cassilis in the Hunter Valley, Australia. It was launched in 1853 in Birkenhead, England. The ship's name is now the location of the present day suburb of Collaroy.

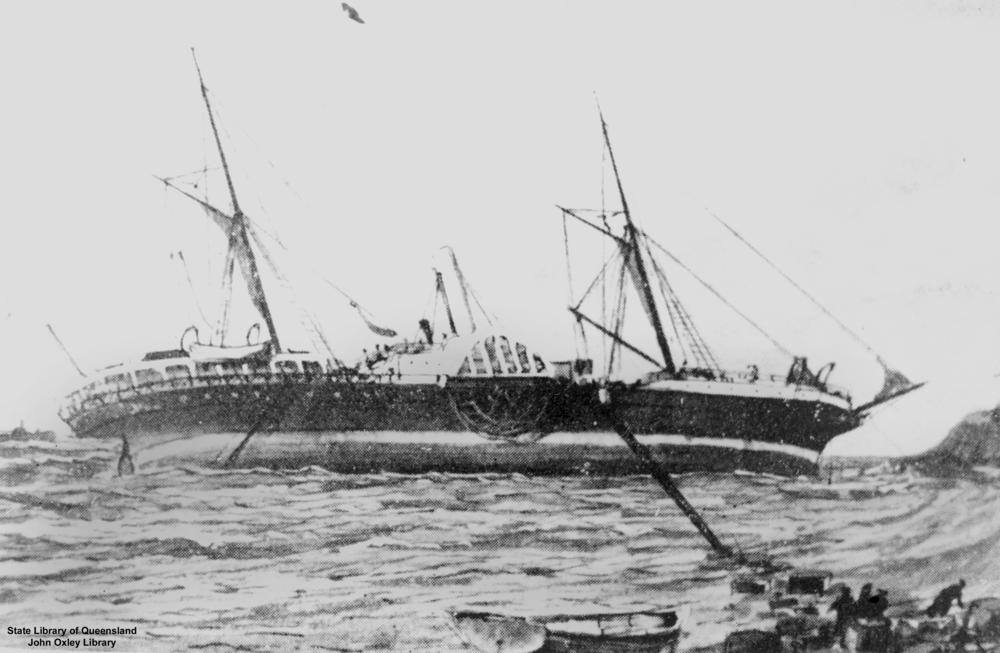
The stranded SS Collaroy

== Stranding at Collaroy ==
Four months after extensive repairs, the ship became beached close to Pittwater Road at Collaroy on 20 January 1881. A navigational error was given as a cause, when the ship attempted to avoid Long Reef near Sydney in heavy fog, without the captain's order. A report in the Sydney Evening News suggests the Collaroy was in an unofficial race with another coastal steamer, the Morpeth. And that a further westerly course would assist in reaching port in a faster time.

Ship's mate Richard Drew stated that he did not see the Broken Bay light, several miles to the north of Long Reef. Another report said he also lost sight of the light at south head. At 3:55 am, ship's mate Richard Drew allegedly advised the captain of dense fog. A land form was noticed, incorrectly assumed to be Long Reef. After being on deck for twenty minutes, breaking waves were noticed on the starboard bow. The Collaroy was proceeding to the beach at ten knots. Orders were given to reverse engines. However, the ship breached the sand without great impact, and was unable to be shifted by the ship's reversing motor.

Initial attempts to drag the ship from the beach were unsuccessful. When Captain Thompson and five other men were attempting to connect the hawser in a smaller boat. All were all thrown overboard by a wave. One of the crew members was drowned. Hercules Dalziel from the Shetland Islands. Reports said he was tangled in nearby seaweed.

On another attempt, the hawser became detached from the rescue tugs. The ship was beached for over three years. The stranded ship became a tourist attraction. The master Captain Martin Thompson and mate Mr Richard Drew had their licenses suspended for three months.

=== Recovery from the beach ===
The new owner, John Robertson of Botany paid £200 for the wreckage before the ship was recovered.

The Collaroy was described as so deep in the sand that the workmen could "step on her sponsons", while its hull was described as "full of water". With considerable labour the vessel was raised off the sand and turned head to sea. A purpose-built cradle was made around the hull which was then swung so that the bow pointed seaward. A ‘way’ or launching ramp was then built ahead of the recovered steamer towards the water. Three additional ‘kedge’ anchors was placed out in the water adjacent to the steamer and attached to the bows. The steam tug Commodore again assisted in pulling Collaroy down the purpose-built ramp when the cable snapped. A second attempt also saw the line parting.

On the third attempt, hydraulic power was employed at the stern of the ship and with the assistance of the tug Leveret, the Collaroy was freed, and hauled from the beach at high tide, 7:30 pm on 9 September 1884. This was met with much celebration from local residents and tourists. And then towed to Darling Harbour in Sydney.

After a week's maintenance on the slipway at Sydney, it was reported that "her engines worked splendidly". A Rodger's small palm anchor was found at the wreck site in 1963 and an admiralty type anchor was also discovered at Collaroy in 2001.

=== Cargo and passengers ===
At the time of the beaching, the ship's cargo consisted of 7 bales of wool, 170 bags of potatoes, 200 hides, 40 casks of tallow, 40 pigs and 30 sheep. The livestock was successfully landed and driven into a paddock close to the wreck. All twenty-four passengers (including 14 saloon and ten in steerage) were successfully brought ashore with their luggage in the starboard lifeboat, in three or four trips. The ladies and children were either carried through the breakers or waded ashore themselves. All but one of the forty aboard were safely landed, many being taken to Manly by a fleet of horse-drawn coaches.

== Fate ==
In February 1888, the Collaroy was sold to its final owner, Alexander Burns. The ship was refitted as a schooner or barkentine rigged sailing ship, with the engine and paddles removed. The Collaroy sailed from Sydney on or about 24 April 1889, bound for Eureka, Humboldt County, California. The cargo was 500 tons of coal, and a crew of ten hands all told. The ship encountered fog five miles north of the entrance to Eureka Harbour on 7 July and was wrecked. No loss of life was recorded. The actions of Captain Alfred Ball were judged as professional, competent and without blame.
