= Wheeler Heights =

- Suburb
- Interactive map of Wheeler Heights
- Country: Australia
- State: New South Wales
- City: Sydney
- LGA: Northern Beaches Council
- Location: 22 km (14 mi) from Sydney CBD

Government
  - State electorate: Pittwater, Wakehurst
  - Federal division: Mackellar
- Elevation: 87 m (285 ft)

Population
  - Total: 3,232 (2021 census)
- Postcode: 2097
Suburbs around Wheeler Heights
Narrabeen Lagoon	Narrabeen
	Wheeler Heights	Collaroy Plateau
Cromer

Wheeler Heights is a suburb of Northern Sydney, in the state of New South Wales, Australia. Wheeler Heights is located 22 kilometres north-east of the Sydney central business district, in the local government area of Northern Beaches Council and is part of the Northern Beaches region. Wheeler Heights was designated as a separate suburb in 1977 with a postcode of 2097 but was reassigned as a locality within Collaroy in 1984. In 2001, all localities were renamed Urban Places. In 2011, Wheeler Heights, along with Collaroy Plateau, was re-established as a suburb by the Geographical Names Board of NSW, after lobbying by the community, who had never ceased considering it to be a suburb since its loss of that title in 1984.

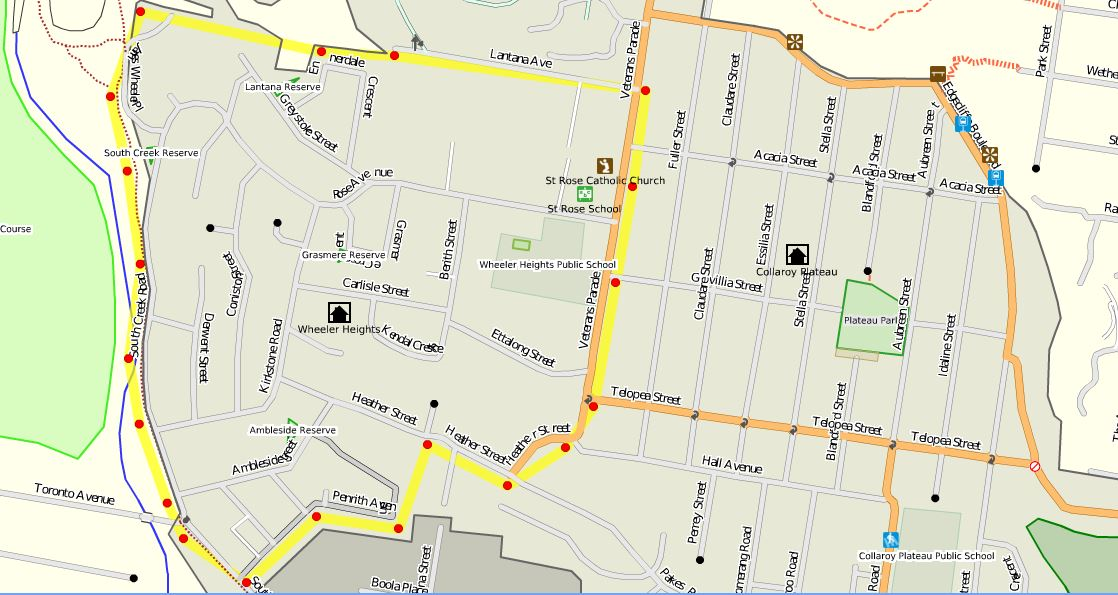
Map showing Wheeler Heights NSW Australia. Created from OpenStreetMap project data.

== History ==
=== Heritage and History of Warringah ===
- 'There are over 1000 sites of Aboriginal culture and heritage in the areas of Sydney known as North Sydney, Lane Cove, Willoughby, Manly, Warringah, Ku-ring-gai, and Pittwater.' 'Despite its relative proximity to Sydney, the Warringah area remained predominantly rural throughout the nineteenth century. The region's isolation and difficult terrain were natural barriers to development.'
- The Wheeler family, originally from Somerset, England, were one of the first families in the (Wheeler Heights) area. James Wheeler (1810-1890), a free settler who already owned land at Dee Why, purchased 150 acres in January 1842 made up of 100 acres on South Creek and 50 acres on Narrabeen Lagoon, where his family remained for over 100 years. In the years that followed, he purchased further land in the area and the Wheeler homestead was a feature of the southern shore of Narrabeen Lagoon. The remains of a stone weir from the former Wheeler Estate can be seen protruding from the shoreline of Narrabeen Lagoon near James Wheeler Place. The Wheeler Estate was broken up after the Second World War.
- The Wheeler family name has been used in James Wheeler Place and the suburb name Wheeler Heights, while other street names of Wheeler Heights reflect the towns and villages of The Lakes District, Cumbria, England, as well as many of the geographical features of the landscape. The names of some of the lakes are the names of Derwent St, Coniston St and Windermere Place. Ambleside St and Penrith Ave are names of larger towns in the lakes district. The dales are a particular feature of the lakes district and have given their names to Ennerdale Crescent and Langdale Place.

=== The naming of Wheeler Heights ===
In 1961 Collaroy Plateau West Primary school was built. The school has access from Rose Ave, Berith St and Veterans Pde.
Over the next six years buses used for taking Collaroy Plateau West Primary school sports teams to interschool sports on Friday afternoons frequently went to the wrong school - Collaroy Plateau Primary School due to the similarity of the name of the two schools.

In 1969 there was an opportunity to change the name of the school and avoid the problem of two schools with very similar names. The name was changed to Wheeler Heights Public School. This was at the suggestion of Stan Walters, a teacher at the school who was interested in the local history.
Wheeler Heights became the commonly used name by locals for the streets surrounding the school, including the name for the shopping strip in South Creek Road, Wheeler Heights.
In 1977 Wheeler Heights was registered as a suburb by the Geographical Names Board.

In 2002 both Wheeler Heights and Collaroy Plateau were stripped of their suburb status by the Geographical Names Board and were downgraded to 'urban places'.
In 2010 a community campaign 'Save our Suburbs' was successful in regaining Wheeler Heights and Collaroy Plateau their status as suburbs.

=== The Superb View Estate ===
Sir Arthur Rickard (1868-1948), real estate developer advertised the Superb View Estate in 1917. This estate developed allotments on Lantana Avenue, Rose Avenue, Ettalong Street, Heather Street, Plateau Road (now Veterans Parade) and Berith Street (Wheeler Heights).

== Landmarks ==
=== Jamison Park ===
Jamieson Park is a 42.8-hectare (106-acre) reserve located along the southern foreshores of Narrabeen Lagoon. It is bounded by the suburbs of Narrabeen, Wheeler Heights, and Cromer. From Wheeler Heights, it can be accessed from James Wheeler Place and South Creek Rd, Wheeler Heights.

=== Narrabeen Lagoon Trail ===
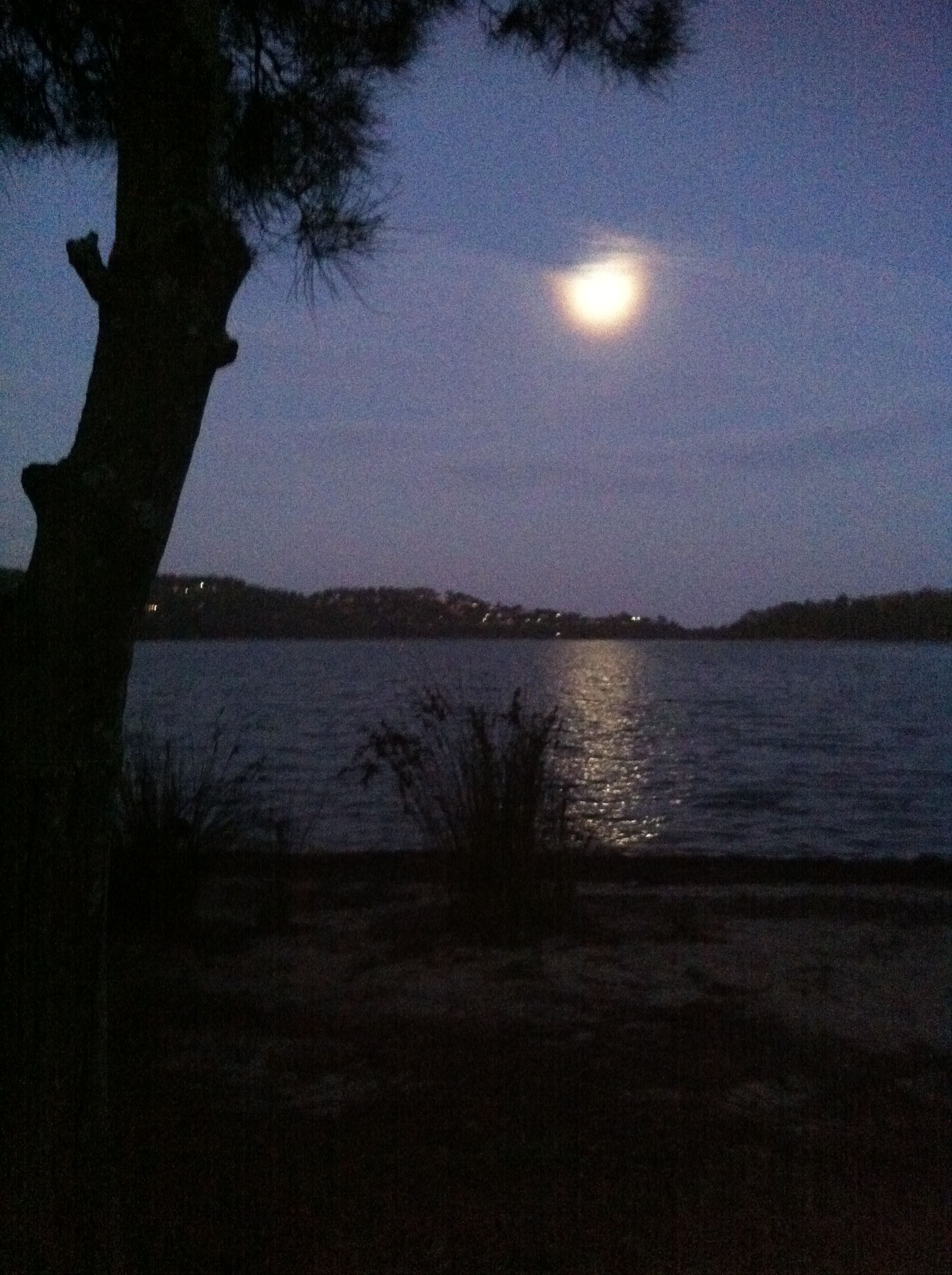
Moonlight over Narrabeen Lagoon

On 25 February 2015, Warringah Council opened the last link in the Narrabeen Lagoon Bush trail from South Creek, Middle Creek and to Deep Creek. The 8.4-kilometre (5.2 mi) complete trail around the Lagoon crosses two steel bridges and runs adjacent to the Sydney Sports Academy. The path and bridges allow bushwalkers, cyclists, and joggers to travel in safety while being close to nature and enjoying the beauty of Narrabeen Lagoon.

== Open public spaces ==
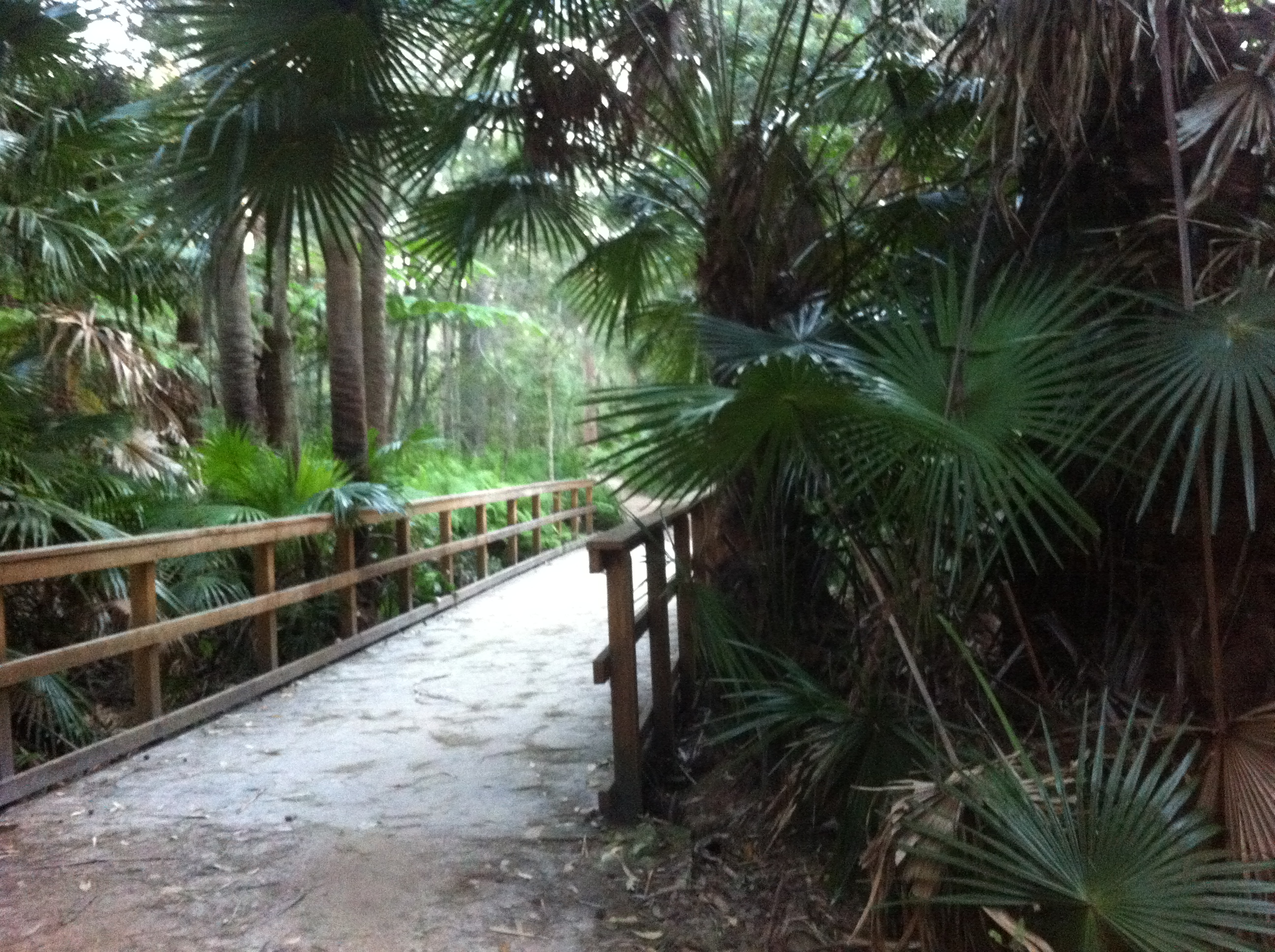
South Creek Reserve is accessed from South Creek Rd and James Wheeler Place. It is part of the Narrabeen Lagoon Bush trail.

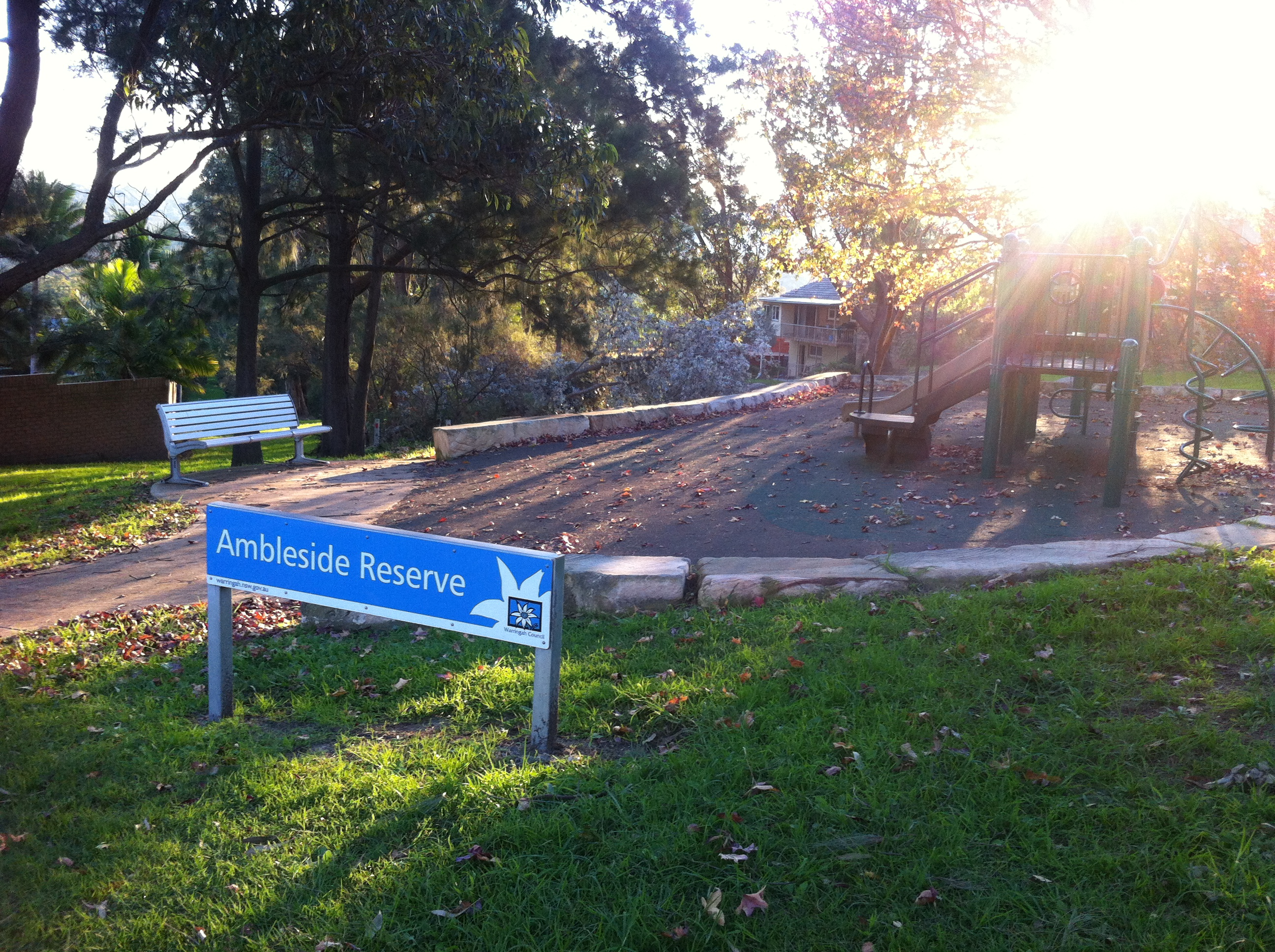
Ambleside Reserve is accessed from Ambleside St. There is a playground.

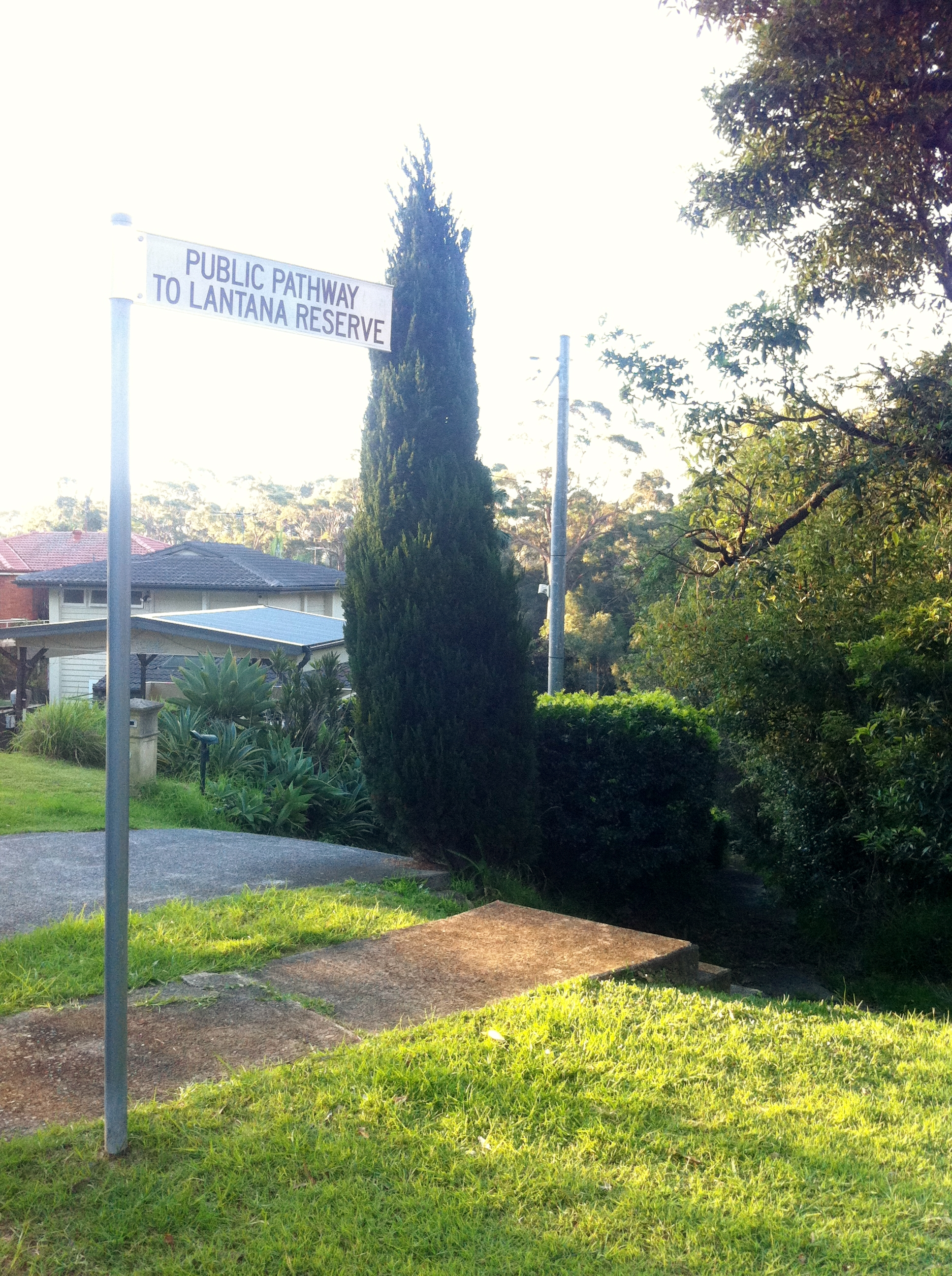
Lantana Reserve is accessed from Greystoke St. via steep steps to an undeveloped bushland area.

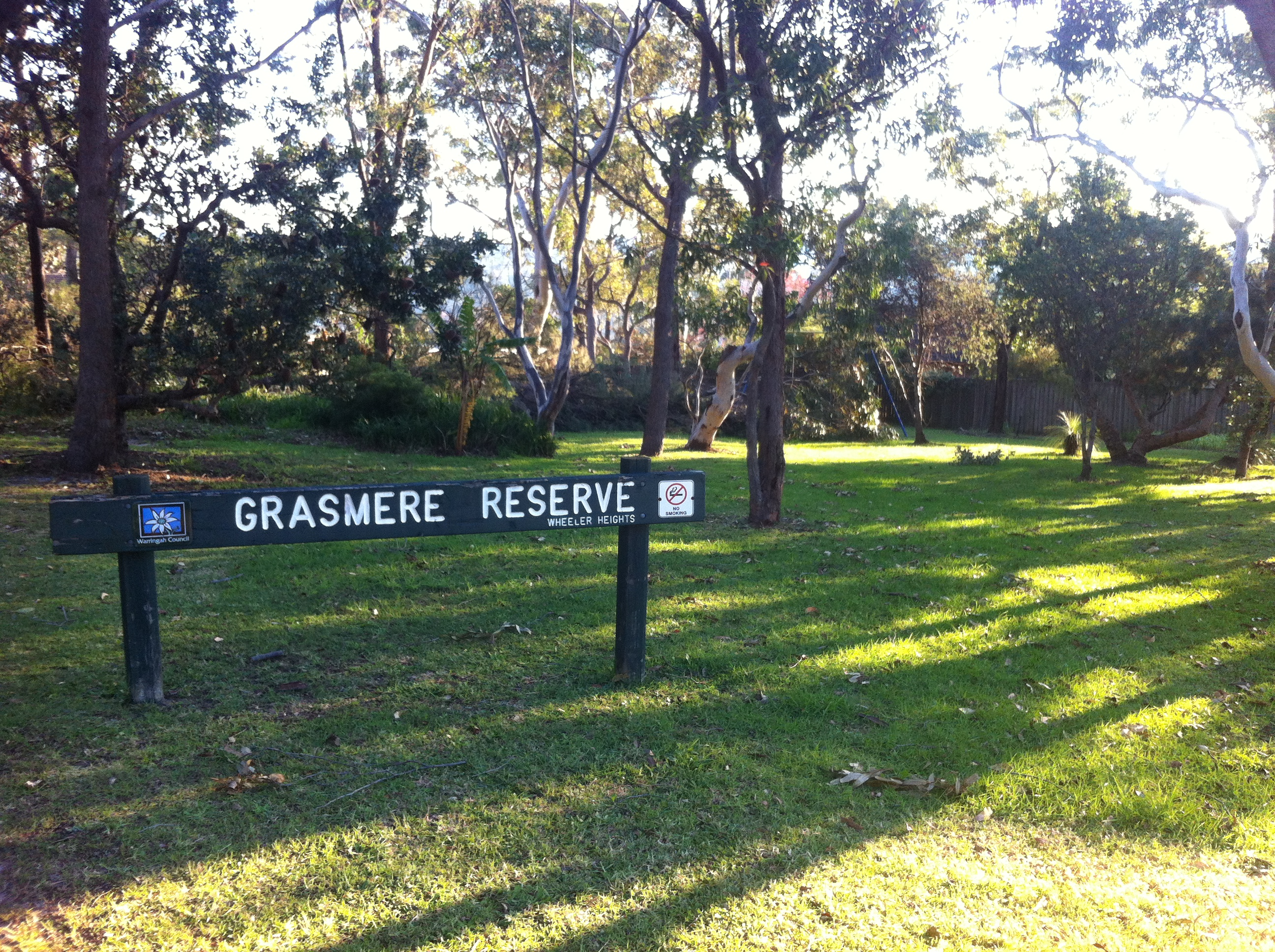
Grasmere Reserve is accessed via Grasmere Cres. There is a playground.

== Native plants and trees ==
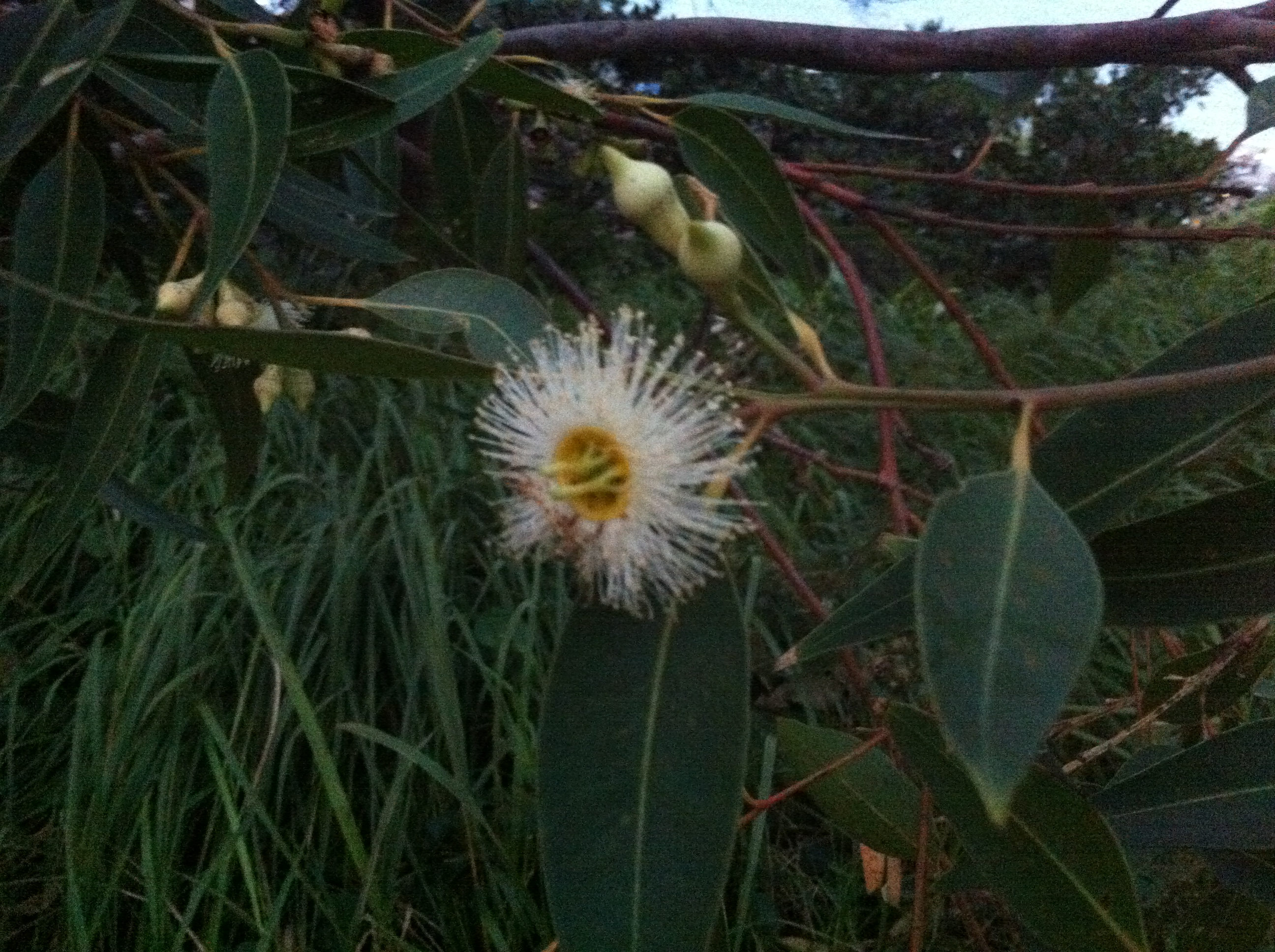
Sydney Gum blossom

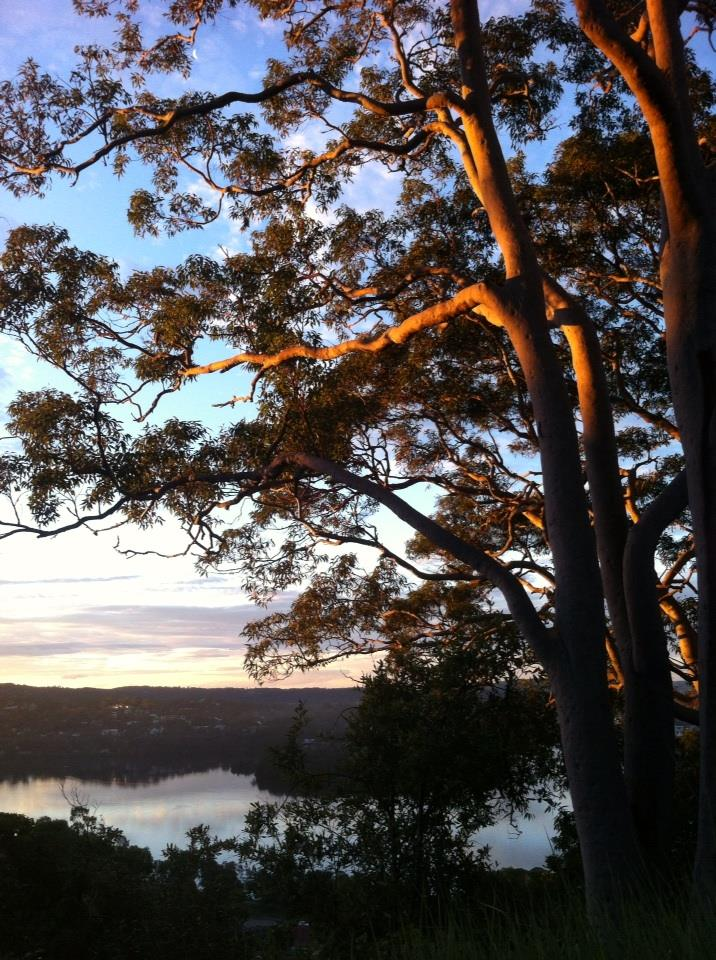
Native Gums, looking North over Jamison Park to Narrabeen lagoon.

Warringah is home to over 900 native plant species, subspecies, varieties, and forms that can be found from the coastal sand dunes and estuaries to sandstone ridgetops and plateaux. Wheeler Heights has dry sclerophyll forests (Shrubby sub formation) 'Shrubby dry sclerophyll forest has typically Australian species such as waratahs, banksias, wattles, pea-flowers, and tea-trees. There is a sparse ground cover of sedges and grasses growing on sandy soils that are among the world's least fertile.'

== Infrastructure and development ==
=== Transport ===
The main form of transport after private cars is by public transport buses.
Wheeler Heights is served by the 179 bus route, operated by Keolis Northern Beaches. It runs between Westfield Warringah Mall and the War Veterans retirement village.

There is no rail transport, the nearest railway station is in Chastwood.

=== Schools and churches ===
Wheeler Heights has one place of worship, St Rose Catholic Church.

There are two schools in Wheeler Heights

- Wheeler Heights Public School
- St Rose Catholic Primary School

There is one Long Day Care Centre

=== Commercial ===
Wheeler Heights has a shopping centre located along South Creek Road. The original centre was redeveloped into a mixed-use complex named Livistona, a process that began in 2017 and was completed in 2020.

The Livistona complex features 39 residential apartments above 10 ground-floor retail spaces, which house various businesses including the Wheeler Heights Post Office.
