= James Graham Somerville =

Australian conservationist (1915–2014)

James Graham Somerville AM (12 July 1915 – 21 May 2014) was an Australian conservationist, pacifist, and environmentalist.

== Early years ==
Jim Somerville was born in Murwillumbah, NSW, the middle child of Reverend James Herbert Somerville and Margaret Somerville (née Pollock). He was educated at various schools around NSW as his father moved with the Methodist Church. In 1933 he did the Leaving Certificate at Fort Street Boys High School describing himself as "an indifferent scholar".

He was unable to find work in the Depression and studied at the Metropolitan Business College graduating as dux in 1934. He studied at night for some years and qualified as an Accountant and Company Secretary.

In the late 1930s, Somerville joined the Coast and Mountain Bush Walking Club.

At the same time Somerville also joined Peace Pledge Union and War Resisters' International as he was increasingly leaning towards strong pacifist views. When conscription was introduced in 1939 he was refused registration as a conscientious objector. At the same time increasing pressure to sign up was being applied by his father's parishioners. So in 1942, aged 27, he left Sydney and went to North Queensland hoping to avoid embarrassment for his family should he be arrested and possibly imprisoned.

== Marriage ==
In June 1943, he attended a pacifist weekend at Point Clare near Gosford where he met a 21-year-old trainee nurse from Bemboka on the far south coast of NSW. Her name was Brenda Alcock who was working at Royal Prince Alfred Hospital at the time. They married on 23 March 1945.

== Qantas ==
On 20 October 1947, Somerville joined Qantas as Estimates Officer and stayed with Qantas for 30 years. By the time he retired in 1976 aged 60 he was Financial Projects Manager. During this time he did many economic studies and some of these are in the National Archives. John Gunn quoted Somerville extensively in his history of Qantas, High Corridors.

== Wilderness visits ==
Somerville particularly loved visiting wilderness places such as the snow-capped mountains of the Andes, the European Alps and the Rockies. He also loved walking New Zealand's Milford Track and Hollyford trail.

In 1968 he walked with his son, Lindsay, 200 km in the Nepalese Himalayas up the Kali Kandaki gorge near Annapurna, and in 1971 visited an outlying island of Fiji where they were the island's first tourists. After retiring from Qantas he made a memorable canoe trip up Glacier Bay in Alaska.

== Narrabeen ==
Following retirement Somerville moved to Wimbledon Ave Narrabeen where he loved all aspects of living by the lagoon – sitting beside it, walking around it and kayaking on it. His love of the lagoon led in the 1970s to fight and win against the sand dredging on Sanctuary island.

During Somerville's 38 years of retirement he was able to devote much of his time to conservation. He also gave his accountancy advice to Tranby, the Aboriginal college in Glebe.

== Narrabeen Lagoon Trail ==
One of Somerville's last hard-fought campaigns was establishing an 8.4 km path around Narrabeen Lagoon despite opposition from Cromer Golf Club and The Academy of Sport. In April 2015 a $4 million federal grant was awarded.

Despite his protestations about not wanting recognition for this project in his honour a bridge on the trail has been named "Jim Somerville Bridge".

== Environmental work ==
Somerville's love of the outdoors led to his involvement in several national park and environmental groups in the 1940s and 1950s. He was a foundation member of the Heathcote Primitive Area Trust, treasurer of the Nature Conservation Council of NSW and director of the Colong Foundation for 45 years from 1968.

Somerville's interests in conservation moved from a weekend passion to a full-time endeavour on his retirement in 1976. His first main project was to prevent the logging of Levers Plateau, in north-east NSW. After a long, hard campaign by the Colong Committee, the Labor government led by Neville Wran agreed to save the forest.

However, when the same government decided to log Grady's Creek Flora Reserve two years later, Somerville shifted his attention to saving it as well. Following a 10-year campaign, the rainforests were eventually saved and were later placed on UNESCO's list of World Heritage Sites as part of the Gondwana Rainforests area.

== Order of Australia ==
In 1986, he was awarded the medal of the Order of Australia, the AM, for services to conservation. He also served as a commissioner on the State Pollution Control Commission, now the Environment Protection Authority, for 9 years.

== Legacy ==
Former local MP for Pittwater and state Minister Rob Stokes said “Jim was a true gentleman and a relentless advocate for our local environment, He never shied away from a challenge and refused to leave an issue unresolved."
