= Narrabeen =

- Suburb
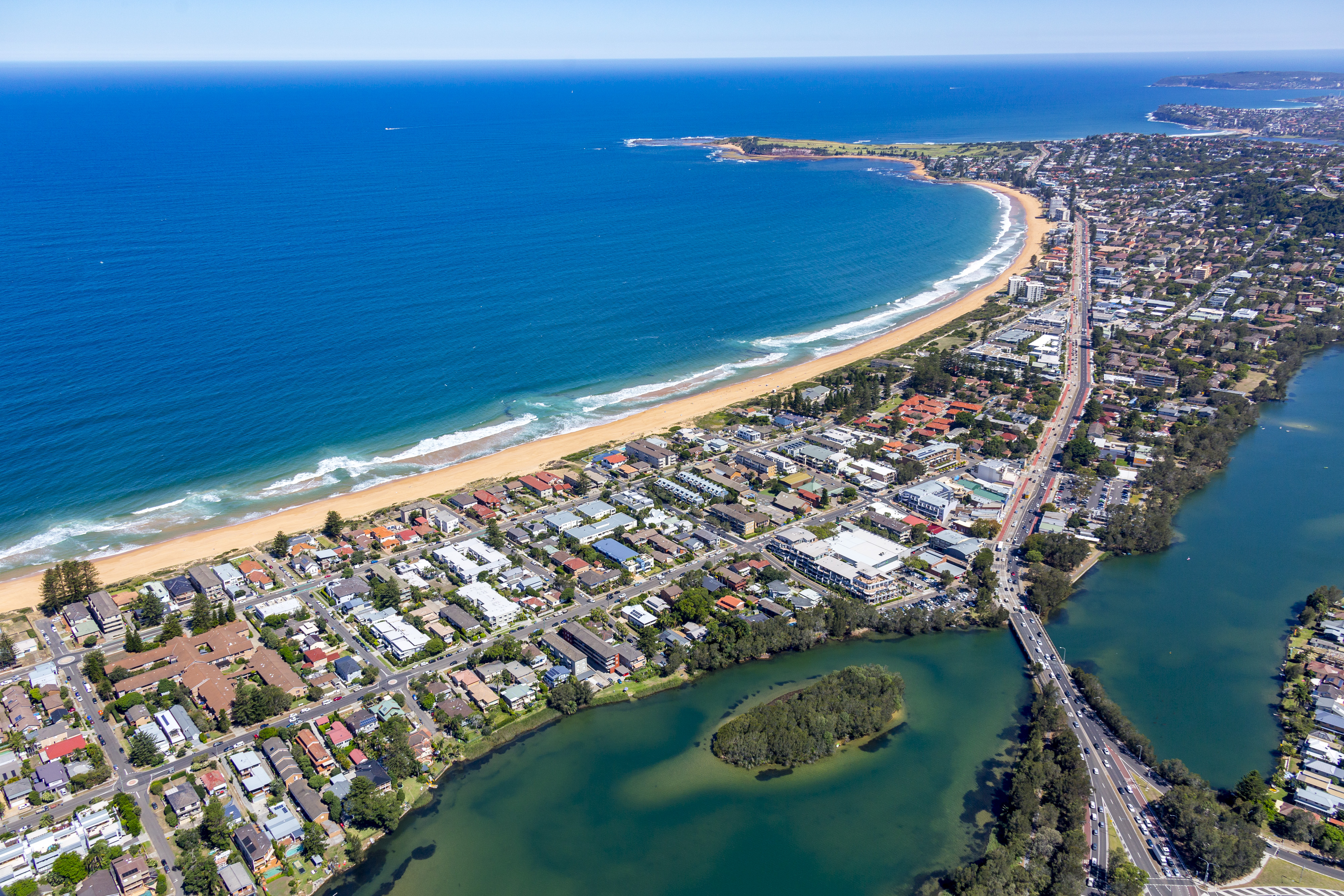
- Narrabeen, looking south east to Long Reef

- Interactive map of Narrabeen
- Country: Australia
- State: New South Wales
- City: Sydney
- LGA: Northern Beaches Council
- Location: 23 km (14 mi) north of Sydney CBD

Government
  - State electorate: Pittwater, Wakehurst
  - Federal division: Mackellar
- Elevation: 9 m (30 ft)

Population
  - Total: 8,255 (2021 census)
- Postcode: 2101
Suburbs around Narrabeen
| North Narrabeen | Warriewood |
| Narrabeen Lagoon | Narrabeen | Pacific Ocean |
| Wheeler Heights | Collaroy Plateau | Collaroy |

Narrabeen is a beachside suburb of northern Sydney, New South Wales, Australia, 23 kilometres (14 mi) northeast of the business district, shared by the local government area of Northern Beaches Council and the Northern Beaches region. The bay was named Broken Bay by James Cook as he sailed past.

== History ==
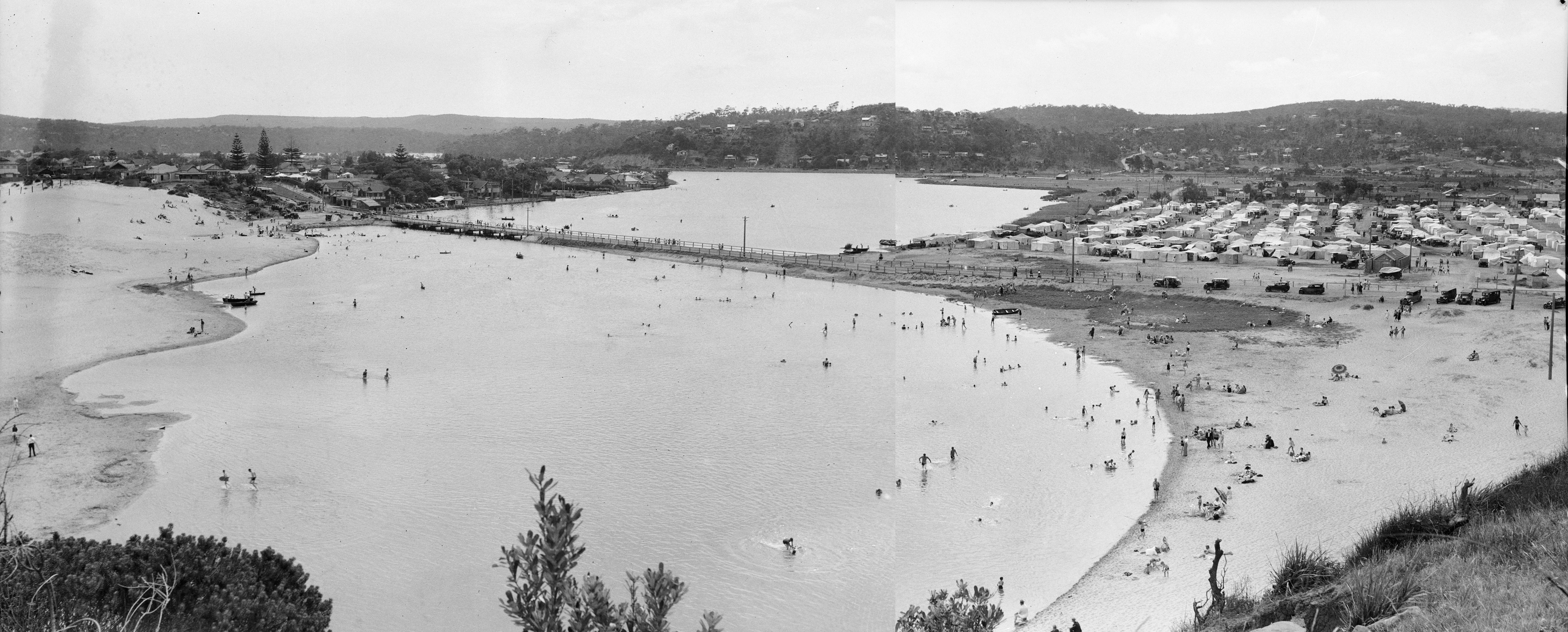
Narrabeen, Sydney, 26 December 1939

There are a number of theories on the origin of the name "Narrabeen". The most fanciful is that Narrabeen is named after "narrow beans" which the English in the first year of settlement (1788) found and ate from a vine growing over beach sand. Surgeon White indeed recorded getting ill from such beans but this was well north of Narrabeen, near Broken Bay. The name Narrobine Creek appears in 1801 in records relating to two escaped convicts, and thus the name appears to have been in use before then. Another suggestion is that it derives from an Aboriginal word meaning "swan".

Surveyor James Meehan placed the name Narabang Narabang Lagoon on a map in 1814 and thought the word meant swan. According to The Budawa Aboriginal Signage Group Inc., Narrabeen means "source of fresh water". The most popular theory involves Captain Henry Reynolds, a first fleeter who took his family to live near the Narrabeen Lagoon. They were all massacred by escaped convicts turned bushrangers, who burned their homestead. The location was then named after the young Aboriginal girl Narrabine/Narrabeen who tried to assist the victims and helped soldiers capture the killers.

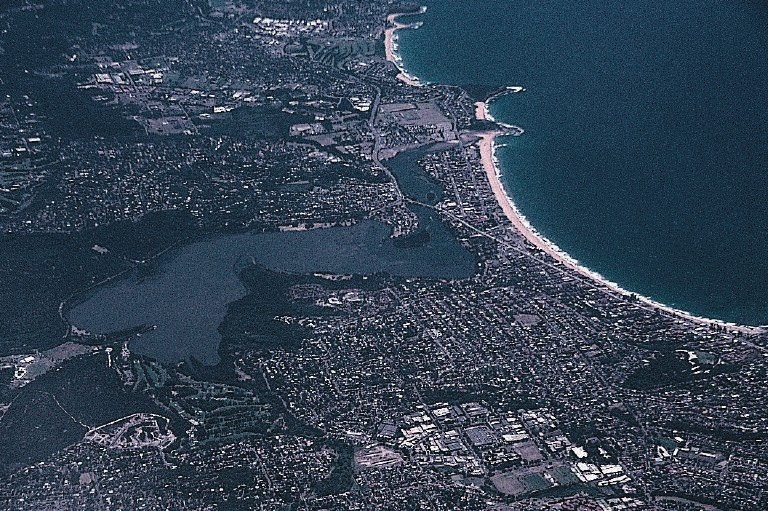
Narrabeen, including Narrabeen Beach and the north and south divisions on either side of the lagoon

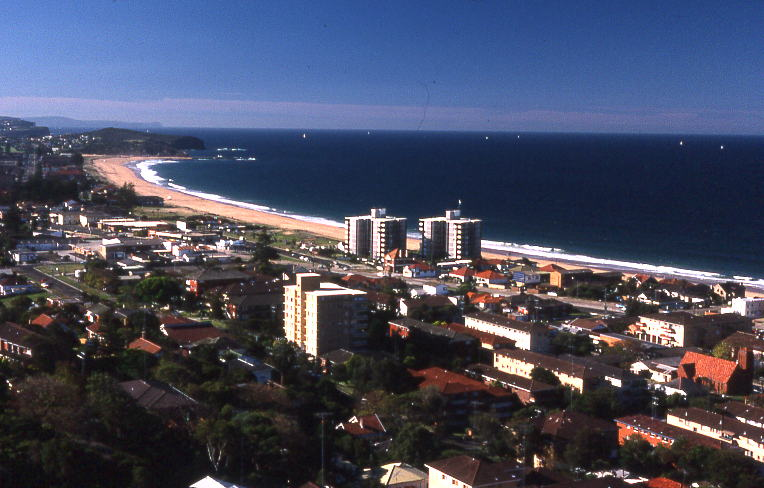
View of Narrabeen from Collaroy Plateau

The first land grants were made to John Lees (40 acres (16 ha)), Philip Schaffer (50 acres (20 ha)), and James Wheeler (80 acres (32 ha)) all along the south bank of Mullet Creek. Alex Macdonald was granted 80 acres (32 ha) at the beach in 1815 and west of this land JT Collins had 93.5 acres (37.8 ha) by 1857.

During the nineteenth century, travellers had to ford the lake until 1880 when the first bridge opened. A second bridge at the mouth of the lagoon in Ocean Street was built in 1925. Narrabeen Post Office opened on 1 August 1898. Narrabeen North Post Office opened on 19 August 1926 and closed in 1984. With the extension of the tram to Narrabeen in 1913 providing easier transport, the whole area around the lake became popular for holidays and camping. A large camping ground became established on the north shore of the lagoon. In 1946 the Wakehurst Parkway was opened to North Narrabeen connecting the whole Pittwater area directly to Frenchs Forest and Seaforth. Narrabeen East Post Office opened on 2 June 1947, was renamed Narrabeen Peninsula in November that year and closed in 1965.

In January 2005, workmen excavating beside the bus shelter on Ocean Street at Octavia Street found a skeleton, which subsequent investigation revealed to be 4,000-year-old remains of a man. He has become known as Narrabeen Man.

== Population ==
In the 2021 census, there were 8,255 people in Narrabeen. 71% of people were born in Australia. The next most common countries of birth were England 6.8%, Brazil 2.2%, New Zealand 2.0%. 84.3% of people spoke only English at home. Other languages spoken at home included Portuguese at 2.6%. The most common responses for religion were No Religion 39.1%, Catholic 23.2% and Anglican 17.4%.

== Beaches ==
There are four beaches along the Narrabeen stretch of beach, North Narrabeen, Narrabeen, South Narrabeen and Collaroy beach. Although Collaroy is a separate suburb, its beach lies along the same stretch. All beaches have their own Surf Life Saving Club. Narrabeen beach is mentioned in the Beach Boys song Surfin' U.S.A., which in their live concert on 28 November 1992 at North Narrabeen Reserve they performed at the end of the encore. It remains an internationally recognised premier surfing beach. Writing celebrating this beach is featured in "Guide to Sydney Beaches" Meuse Press. It suffers regular challenges from storm damage and beach erosion. The grassy parts of the beaches are situated on the endangered Themeda Grassland ecological community.

== Lagoon and catchment ==
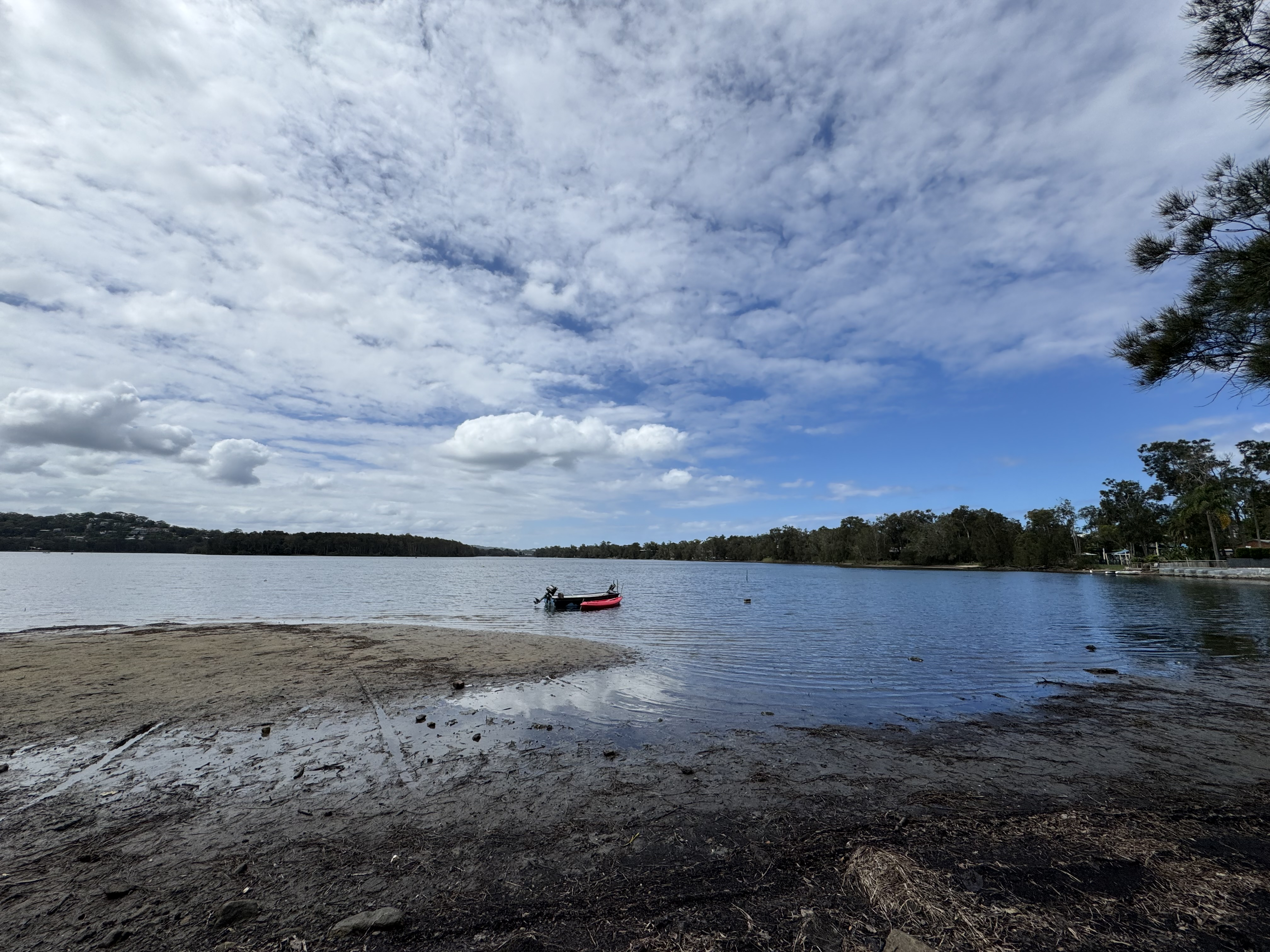
Narrabeen Lagoon

Narrabeen lagoon is fed by Deep Creek, Middle Creek, Mullet Creek, Narrabeen Creek and Nareen Creek, and occupies about 2.2 square kilometres, and has a catchment of about 55 square kilometres. The catchment of Narrabeen Lagoon consist of just under half bushland, one quarter parks, sports fields and rural lands, with the remainder being used for residential or industrial purposes, and Garigal National Park making up a third of the bushland. Despite the significant urban impact there are some twenty six vegetation communities to be found within the catchment, some of which are not found in either Garigal nor its neighbouring Ku-ring-gai Chase National Park, in particular, Blackbutt -Turpentine Forest and Angophora - White Mahogany Forest, both of which are components of the Duffys Forest endangered ecological community. (See Duffys Forest Ecological community.) Most of the remnant ecological communities within the catchment have been defined as endangered ecological communities (EECs), e.g., Swamp Mahogany Forest is a component of Swamp Sclerophyll Forest, Coastal Freshwater Wetland a component of Freshwater Wetlands on Coastal Floodplains both declared as EECs, see the List of endangered ecological communities in NSW and Native Vegetation (2016). Narrabeen Lagoon Trail is an 8.6 km (5.3 mi) path around the lagoon.

== Sport and recreation ==
The Sydney Institute of Sport is based in Narrabeen and has recently become the headquarters of the Manly-Warringah Sea Eagles rugby league club. North Narrabeen beach is commonly used for surfing competitions.

== Education ==
Narrabeen is home to two public primary schools (Narrabeen Lakes and North Narrabeen), St. Joseph's Catholic Primary School and the public Narrabeen Sports High School.

== Jim Somerville Bridge ==
James Graham Somerville, an environmentalist, is commemorated by the Jim Somerville Bridge on the Narrabeen Lagoon Trail.

== Notable residents ==
- Tessa de Josselin, actress
- Jackson Heywood, actor
- Nathan Hedge, surfer
- Holly Lincoln-Smith, water polo player
- Elisabeth MacIntyre, writer
- Ian Palangio, curler
- Alan Thompson, rugby league player
- Harry Van der Saag, footballer
- Max Whitehead, rugby league player
- Laura Enever, surfer
