= Collaroy Plateau =

- Suburb
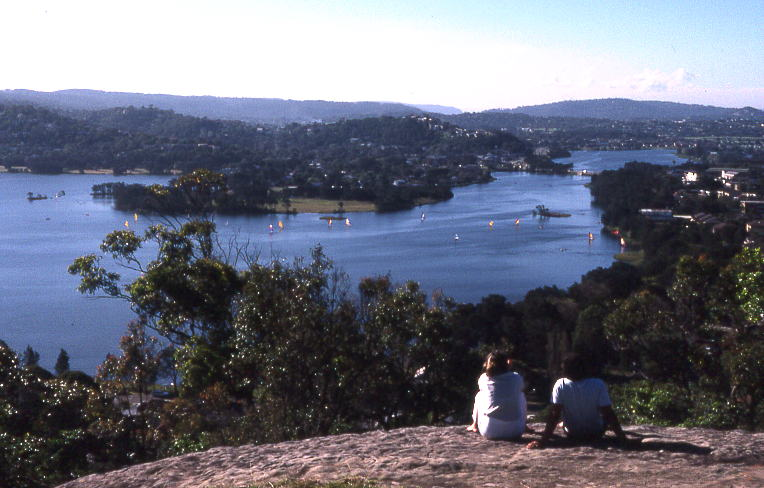
- View to the north from Collaroy Plateau

- Interactive map of Collaroy Plateau
- Country: Australia
- State: New South Wales
- City: Northern Beaches
- LGA: Northern Beaches Council
- Location: 22 km (14 mi) north-east of Sydney CBD

Government
  - State electorate: Pittwater, Wakehurst
  - Federal division: Mackellar
- Elevation: 91 m (299 ft)

Population
  - Total: 4,805 (2021 census)
- Postcode: 2097
Suburbs around Collaroy Plateau
Narrabeen Lagoon	Narrabeen
Wheeler Heights	Collaroy Plateau	Collaroy
Cromer

Collaroy Plateau is a suburb of northern Sydney, in the state of New South Wales, Australia. Collaroy Plateau is 22 kilometres north-east of the Sydney central business district, in the local government area of Northern Beaches Council and is part of the Northern Beaches region. Collaroy Plateau was designated as a separate suburb in 1977 with a postcode of 2098, but was reassigned as a locality within Collaroy in 1984, with the postcode changing to 2097 as part of Collaroy. In 2001 all localities were renamed Urban Places. In 2011 Collaroy Plateau, along with Wheeler Heights, was re-established as a suburb by the Geographical Names Board of NSW, after lobbying by the community, who had never ceased considering it to be a suburb since its loss of that title in 1984.

Collaroy Plateau has views of Sydney's Northern Beaches, with parts of the suburb overlooking Collaroy Beach, Long Reef Beach, Narrabeen Beach and Narrabeen Lagoon.

Collaroy Beach is also the landing point of the PPC-1 submarine cable, one of three backhaul communication links connecting Australia to the wider Internet.

== History ==
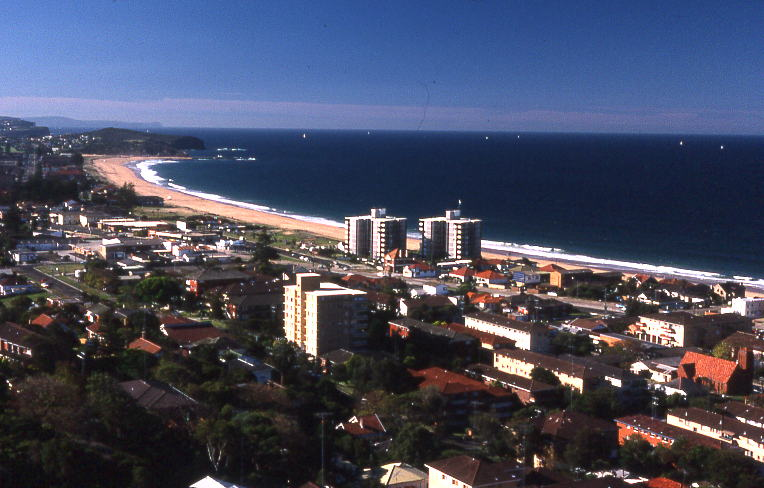
View of Narrabeen from Collaroy Plateau

The name Collaroy is aboriginal for "big reeds", and the suburb began its life as part of Narrabeen. In 1881, the steamer "Collaroy" ran aground on Long Reef at the southern point of the suburb. Crowds came from all around the district to see the wreck that subsequently gave its name to the suburb. Its anchor can still be found at the Narrabeen Primary School.

Collaroy Plateau Post Office opened on 1 April 1949 and closed in 1988. Collaroy Plateau West Post Office opened on 1 November 1967 and was renamed Collaroy Plateau in 1996.

- Heritage and History of Warringah
  'There are over 1000 sites of Aboriginal culture and heritage in the areas of Sydney known as North Sydney, Lane Cove, Willoughby, Manly, Warringah, Ku-ring-gai, and Pittwater.' 'Despite its relative proximity to Sydney, the Warringah area remained predominantly rural throughout the nineteenth century. The region's isolation and difficult terrain were natural barriers to development.'

== Landmarks ==
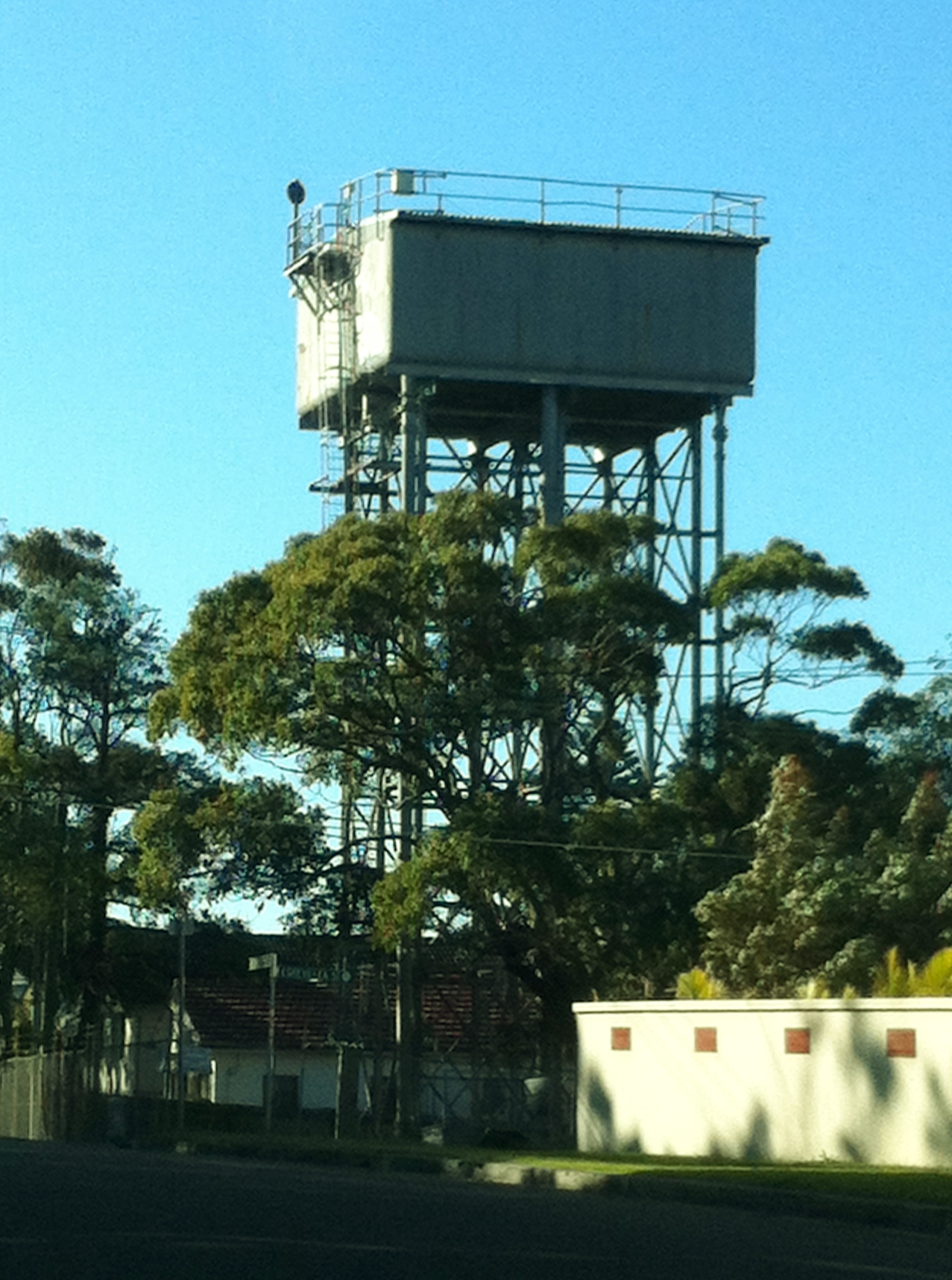
Collaroy Reservoir Heritage item

=== Collaroy Reservoir ===
Collaroy Reservoir (Elevated) (WS 30) was one of a small group of reservoirs in the Sydney Water system, which was originally constructed for railway purposes. It demonstrated a significant adaptation of railway technology for water supply purposes. The listing included the reservoir and all associated pipework, valves and valve houses to the property boundary. The reservoir was demolished in 2018 by Sydney Water.

=== Collaroy Trig Station ===
The requirement for accurate maps in Australia led to the development of a control network of Trig stations. The word "trig" is short for trigonometric. Trig stations can be located on landmarks such as hills or high man-made structures such as buildings, or grain silos or water reservoirs. The process of triangulation was used as the method to provide the locations of the trig stations, which were then used to connect to smaller scale surveys or for mapping.
The geodetic infrastructure in New South Wales incorporates approximately 6,000 traditional trigonometric stations that formed the backbone of the survey control network before the introduction of more than 160 CORSnet-NSW stations. TP5865 – Collaroy Trig station is located on top of the heritage Collaroy Reservoir.

=== Collaroy radar station 54RS – WWII ===
In February 1942 American forces arrived in Australia bringing with them MAWDs (Modified Air Warning Device); which filled an urgent need in Australia. The operators sat out in the open exposed to the elements and hand turned the aerial, even during tropical downpours, heavy winds, etcetera.
101RS station was installed at North Head, Sydney, NSW close to the Army coastal batteries. Little is known of its performance there except that it interfered with Army communications between batteries. Brig. J S Whitelaw, Commander of Fixed Defences, spoke to P/O Swan requesting that the unit be moved adding the comment that 101RS would provide better air warning if it was relocated north of Sydney as Japanese ships were in the Coral Sea.
P/O Swan selected the Collaroy Plateau as the new site after travelling to Palm Beach by bus.
54RS at Collaroy was to become one of the more important radar sites particularly as a testing ground due to its relatively close proximity to the laboratory. It also served as a training station for operators and as a rest station for airmen who had served in the northern combat zones.
54RS was officially disbanded on 21 January 1947. p49–p59 Extracts from

=== Northern Beaches ===
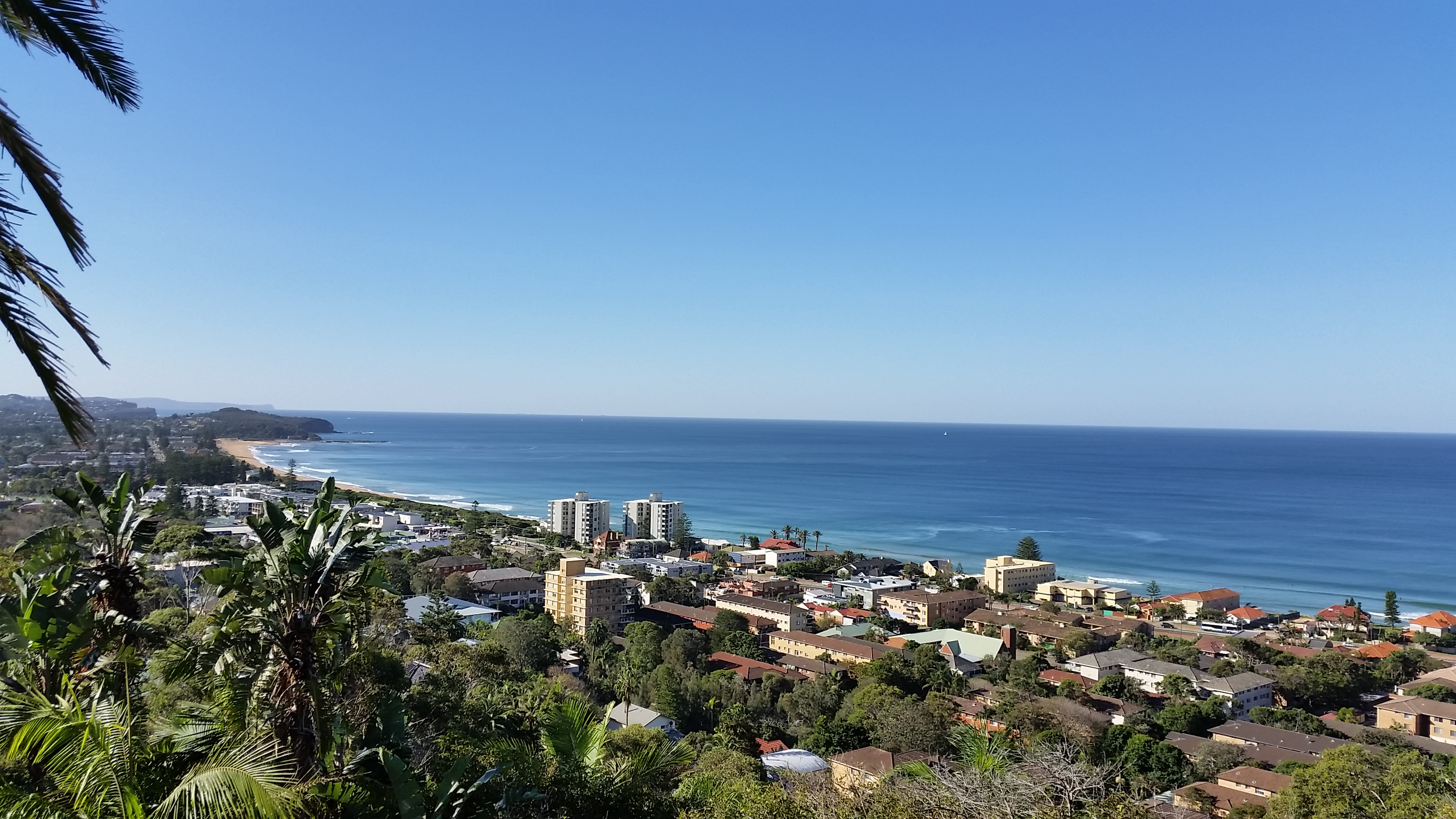
View from Collaroy Plateau north across Narrabeen beach and lagoon

Various parts of Collaroy Plateau overlook Collaroy Beach, Long Reef Beach, Narrabeen Beach and Narrabeen Lagoon. The view as described in 1921

"... stand on the heights above Collaroy Beach, just before coming to Narrabeen. It is a strenuous climb, up from the tramline, but the 'Superb View Estate' is well named. Right away north lies the Hawkesbury River, and as we stand on the 'trig.' station we can see the entrance to the 'Ten-mile reach' on its farther side. While looking south we can see Manly, South Head, Bondi, and quite a long stretch of the southern shores of the harbour. Westward lie the heights around Gordon, and the panting of a locomotive can be distinctly heard. Just near us are clumps of waratahs, and the promise of thousands of Christmas bells."

== Notable people ==
=== Joseph Lade Pawsey ===
Joseph Lade Pawsey Joseph Lade Pawsey MSc PhD (1908–1962) conducted Australia's first successful experiment to detect radio waves from the sun on 3 October 1945 at the Radar Station at Plateau Park, Collaroy Plateau. He then became the leader of CSIRO's Radiophysics Radio Astronomy Division from 1945 until his death in 1962.

The work of Joseph Pawsey has led to the development and commercialization of modern technologies including wi-fi.

=== Frank Hurley ===
James Francis (Frank) Hurley (1885–1962), adventurer, photographer and film maker, was born on 15 October 1885 at Glebe, Sydney. He died at his home at Collaroy Plateau on 16 January 1962. Follow the link for some of his photography taken on Collaroy Plateau and other locations.
Sunrise across lagoon from home window at Collaroy Plateau.
Australian Screen

=== Ted Dellit, a WW2 radar veteran ===
Ted lived on Collaroy Plateau from 1961 for many years.
His book, Who Were They?, The Royal Australian Air Force on Collaroy Plateau in the Second World War, is reputed to be one of the best written and researched unit histories available. He donated many books to the library at EASTROC RAAF Williamtown, and the library was renamed, "The Ted Dellit Library".
As WW2 radar people wrote their unit histories Ted ensured that a copy of each book went to the RAF Air Defence Radar Museum at Neatishead, near Norwich in England. Ted was for many years an active member of the Radar Branch of the RAAF Association (NSW), was a member of the committee since 1993 and held the positions of Secretary and DVA rep. He resigned from the committee in 2007. He was also an active member of the Collaroy Plateau Public School Parents & Citizens Association and managed a number of soccer and cricket teams of the Collaroy Plateau Youth Club.

== Open public spaces ==
- Edgar Gornall Wildflower Garden
- McLeans Lookout
- Plateau Park
- Anzac Avenue Reserve

== Native flora ==
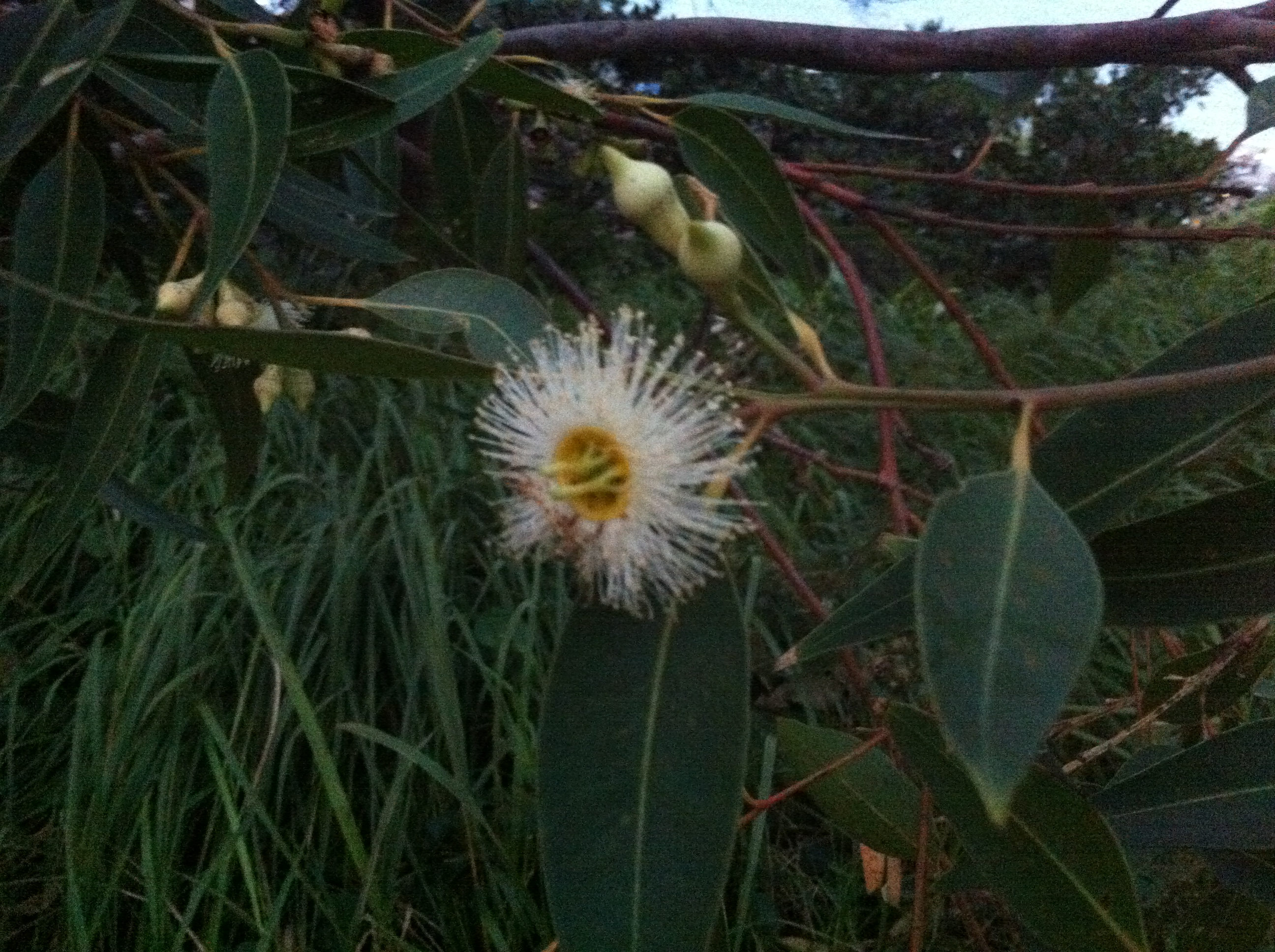
Sydney Gum blossom

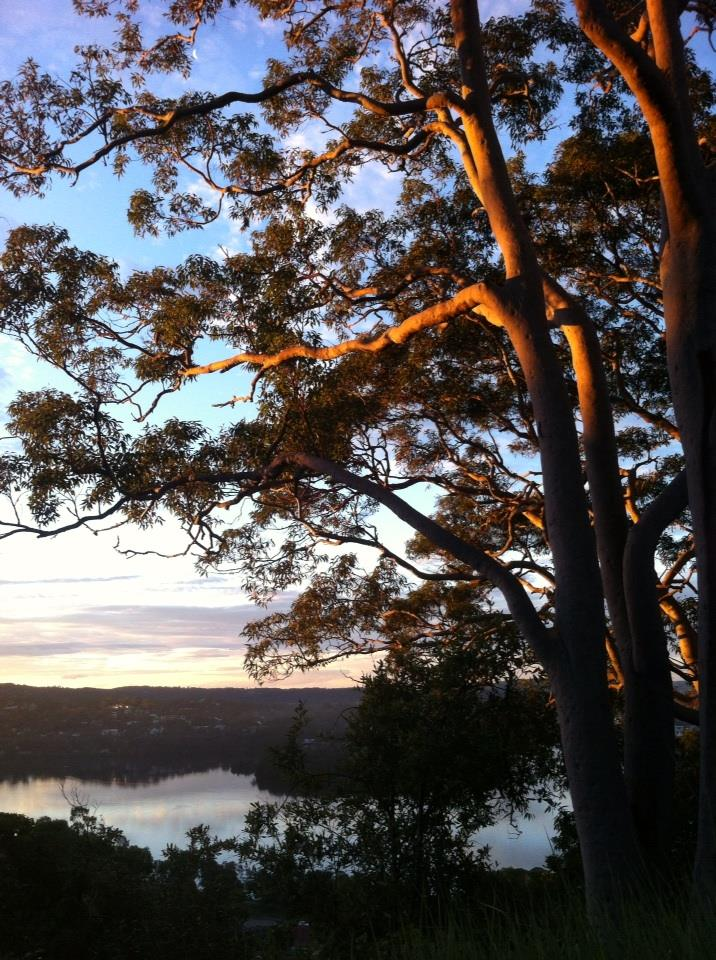
Native Gums, looking North over Jamison Park to Narrabeen lagoon.

Warringah is home to over 900 native plant species, subspecies, varieties and forms that can be found from the coastal sand dunes and estuaries to sandstone ridge tops and plateaux. Collaroy Plateau has dry sclerophyll forests (Shrubby subformation) 'Shrubby dry sclerophyll forest has typically Australian species such as waratahs, banksias, wattles, pea-flowers and tea-trees. There is a sparse ground cover of sedges and grasses growing on sandy soils that are among the world's least fertile.'

== Infrastructure and development ==
=== Transport ===
The main form of transport after private cars is by public transport buses.

=== Schools and churches ===
Schools

- Collaroy Plateau Primary School.
- Collaroy Plateau Swim School
- Sally's Family Day Care, Collaroy Plateau NSW 2097
- Collaroy Plateau Community Kindergarten, 41–43 Hall Avenue, Collaroy Plateau NSW 2097
- Owl & The Pussycat Preschool, 47 Stella Street, Collaroy Plateau NSW 2097
- Collaroy Plateau Early Learning Centre, 26 Plateau Road, Collaroy Plateau NSW 2097
- Little Diggers Preschool on the Plateau, RSL Lifecare Potts Point Cottage Edmondson VC Drive, Collaroy Plateau NSW 2097
- Collaroy Plateau OOSH, Collaroy Plateau Public School, 41A Plateau Road

Churches

- Saints Paul and Reweis Coptic Orthodox Church
- Church of St Rose

== Sport ==
=== Collaroy Plateau Cricket Club ===
Established in 1955, the club represents the local community in the Manly Warringah Cricket Association and the Manly Warringah Junior Cricket Association. It stands as one of the largest park cricket clubs on the Northern Beaches with around 25 junior and seniors teams. Numerous juniors have gone on to play for higher honors in Sydney Grade cricket.

The club emblem is the Collaroy Plateau Water Tower ("Collaroy Reservoir") and their home ground is Vic Huxley Oval (Collaroy Plateau Park).
