= Collaroy, New South Wales =

Collaroy
- Suburb
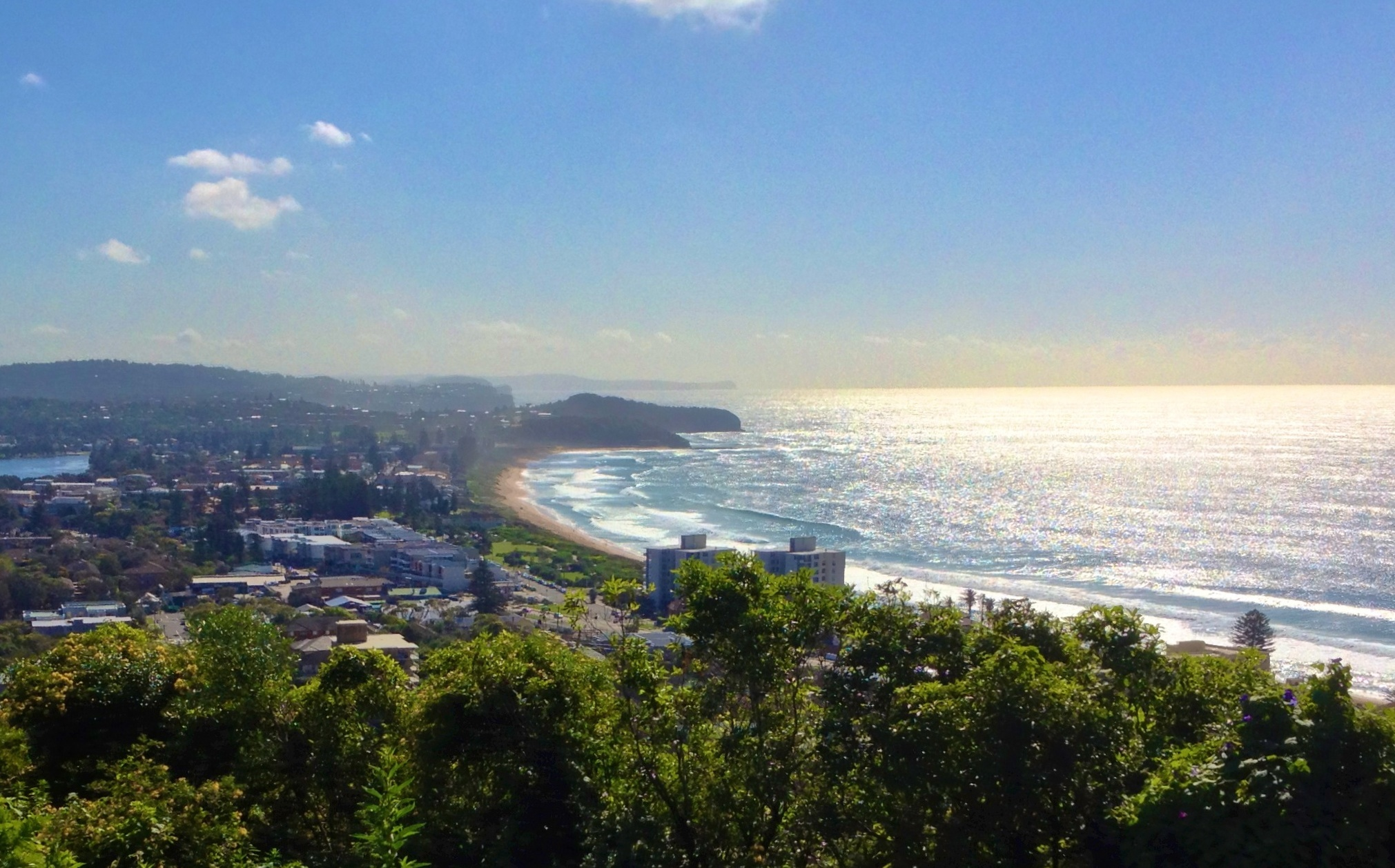
- A view of Collaroy from Collaroy Plateau

- Interactive map of Collaroy
- Country: Australia
- State: New South Wales
- City: Sydney
- LGA: Northern Beaches Council
- Location: 22 km (14 mi) north-east of Sydney CBD

Government
  - State electorate: Wakehurst
  - Federal division: Mackellar
- Elevation: 8 m (26 ft)

Population
  - Total: 7,944 (2021 census)
- Postcode: 2097
Suburbs around Collaroy
	Narrabeen	Tasman Sea
Collaroy Plateau	Collaroy	Tasman Sea
Cromer	Dee Why	Tasman Sea

Collaroy is a suburb in northern Sydney, in the state of New South Wales, Australia. Collaroy is 22 kilometres north-east of the Sydney central business district, in the local government area of Northern Beaches Council. It is part of the Northern Beaches region. Nicknamed "The Roy" by many of the locals.

== History ==
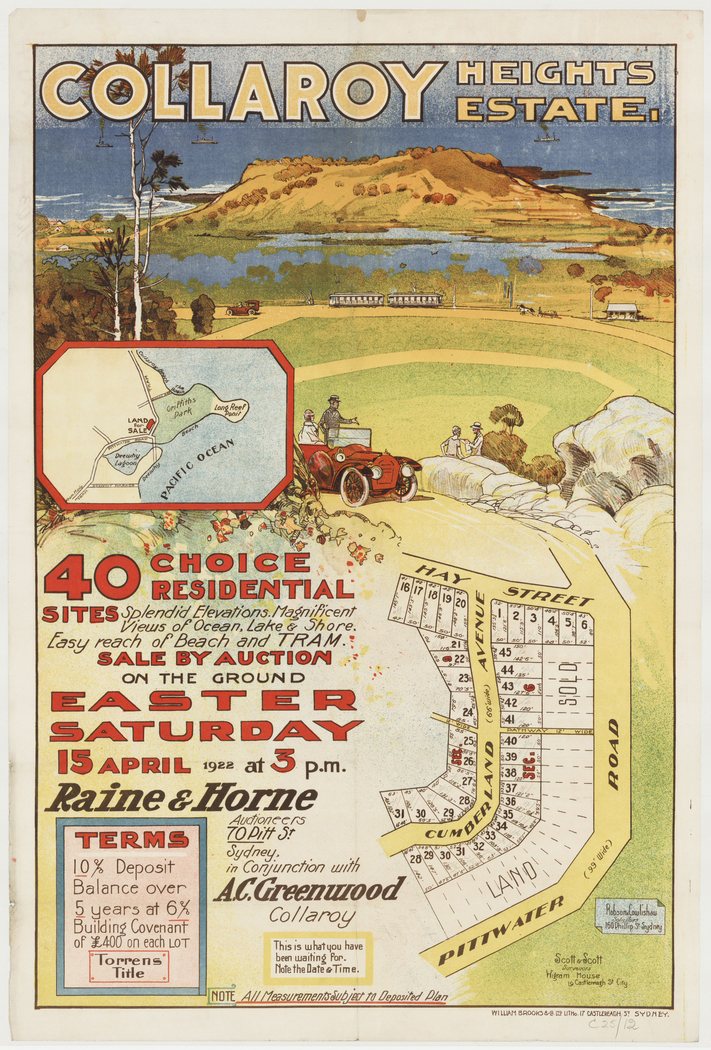
Collaroy Heights Estate, 1922, subdivision plan, printed by William Brooks and Co.

This area was originally part of Narrabeen but was renamed after the SS Collaroy ran aground on the beach in 1881. It was refloated and later wrecked on the Californian coast in 1889. Most of Collaroy's development has occurred since the mid twentieth century.

An anchor from the S.S. Collaroy has been on display on the grounds of Narrabeen Lakes Public School since 1928.

Collaroy Beach Post Office opened on 12 February 1923. Collaroy Plateau Post Office opened on 1 April 1949 and closed in 1988. Collaroy Plateau West Post Office opened on 1 November 1967 and was renamed Collaroy Plateau in 1996.

The beach and housing near the beach on Pittwater Road were badly affected by weather in early June 2016. A strip of houses lost backyards and were left in danger of collapse.

== Landmarks ==
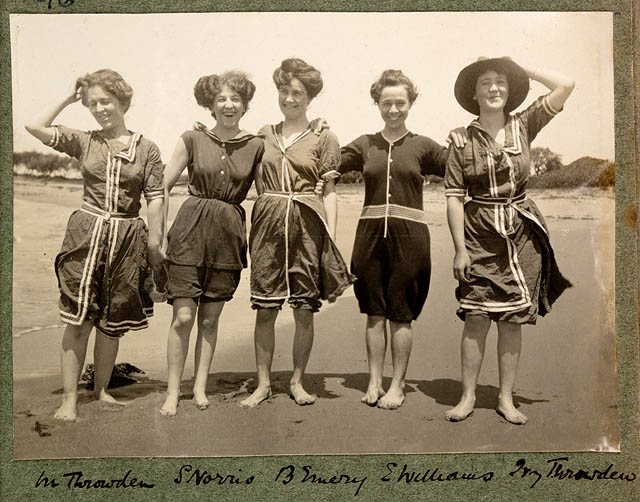
Women in bathing suits on Collaroy Beach (1908) by Colin Caird

Collaroy's surf beach joins Narrabeen Beach at Wetherill Street making one continuous 3.4 km surf beach. Four Surf Lifesaving Clubs provide swimming supervision/surf rescue services (North Narrabeen SLC, Narrabeen SLC, South Narrabeen SLC, and Collaroy SLC).

Collaroy is home to one of the Salvation Army's largest conference and outdoor education centres in the area. The centre caters for many conferences of the Salvation Army as well as other churches, schools, community groups and businesses. It can cater for up to 440 people and has fully catered camp programs.

== Demographics ==
According to the 2021 census, there were 7,944 residents in Collaroy. The most common ancestries were English 41.8%, Australian 32.0%, Irish 14.3%, Scottish 11.0% and Italian 7.1%. 70.0% of people were born in Australia. The next most common countries of birth were England 6.4% and New Zealand 2.2%. 83.2% of people spoke only English at home. Other languages spoken at home included Portuguese 1.9% and Italian 1.7%. The most common responses for religion were No Religion 41.0%, Catholic 26.3% and Anglican 14.1%.

== Commercial area ==
Collaroy's shopping precinct is centred along Pittwater Road, which runs north–south through the suburb. Small retail businesses include cafes, restaurants, a book shop, takeaway bars, a pharmacy, a newsagent/post office, several hairdressers, a day spa, a YHA youth hostel, real estate agents, Collaroy cinema, the Collaroy Services club (also known as "The Beach Club") and "The Collaroy", which was formerly known as the Surf Rock Hotel, re-opened in November 2014.

== Transport ==
Collaroy's public transport consists of buses operated by Keolis Northern Beaches south through to the CBD, Manly, North Sydney (peak hour services only), and north to the suburbs from Narrabeen to Palm Beach.

== Governance ==
Collaroy is in the federal seat of Mackellar. The seat is currently held by Independent politician Sophie Scamps, who defeated Jason Falinski of the Liberal Party at the 2022 Australian federal election. The seat had previously been held continuously by the Liberal Party since its creation in 1949.

Collaroy is in the NSW state electorate of Wakehurst, a seat held by Michael Regan.

== Wildlife ==
Collaroy/Narrabeen is frequented by diverse bird and aquatic animal life including Sea Eagles, Pelicans, Terns, Ducks, Yellow-crested Cockatoo. Dolphins and whales can be seen during migrating season. In 2005 a young New Zealand Fur Seal was discovered washed up on the beach. Exhausted but alive, the Seal was nursed back to health by wildlife officers and then released. A similar incident, with another New Zealand fur seal coming ashore, occurred in August 2014.

== Schools ==
- The Pittwater House Schools

== Notable people ==
- Iza Coghlan, doctor
- Gabriella Da Silva-Fick, tennis player
- Tim Freedman, musician
- Michael Hooper, rugby union player
- Emma Jeffcoat, triathlete
- Simon Kennewell, rugby union player
- Boyd Killingworth, rugby union player
- Johanna Konta, tennis player
- Nat Young, surfer
