= Westfield Warringah Mall =

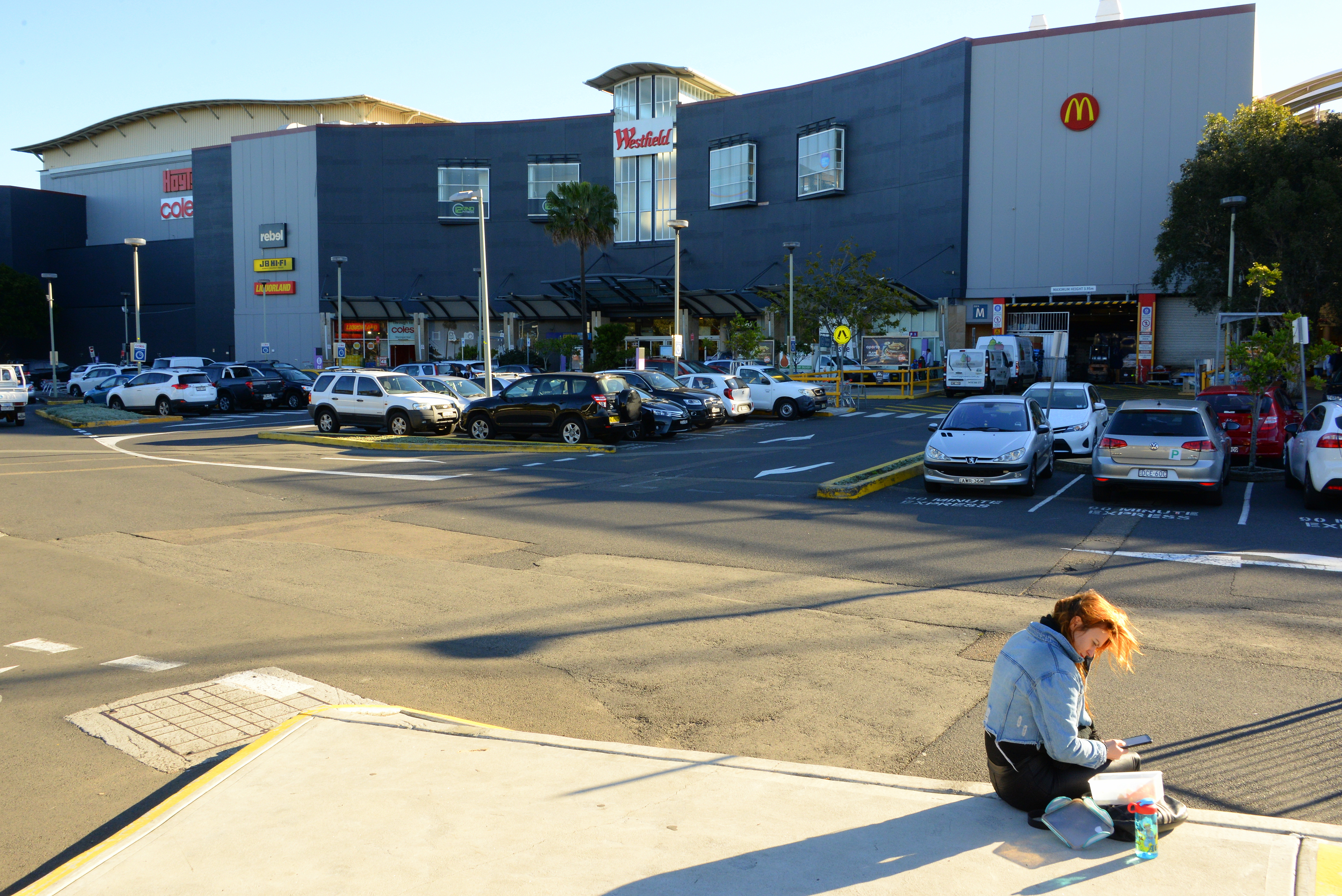
- Entrance to Westfield Warringah Mall from Condamine Street
- Location: Brookvale, New South Wales, Australia
- Coordinates: 33°46′04″S 151°15′58″E
- Address: Condamine Street
- Opened: 4 April 1963; 63 years ago
- Previous names: Warringah Mall (1963 - 2012)
- Developer: Hammerson Group
- Manager: Scentre Group
- Owner: Scentre Group (50%); Dexus Wholesale Property Fund (50%)
- Num. of stores: 362
- Num. of anchor tenants: 7
- Floor area: 131,900 m^{2} (1,419,760 sq ft)
- Floors: 3
- Parking: 4,650 spaces
- Public transit: Warringah Mall
- Website: westfield.com.au/warringahmall

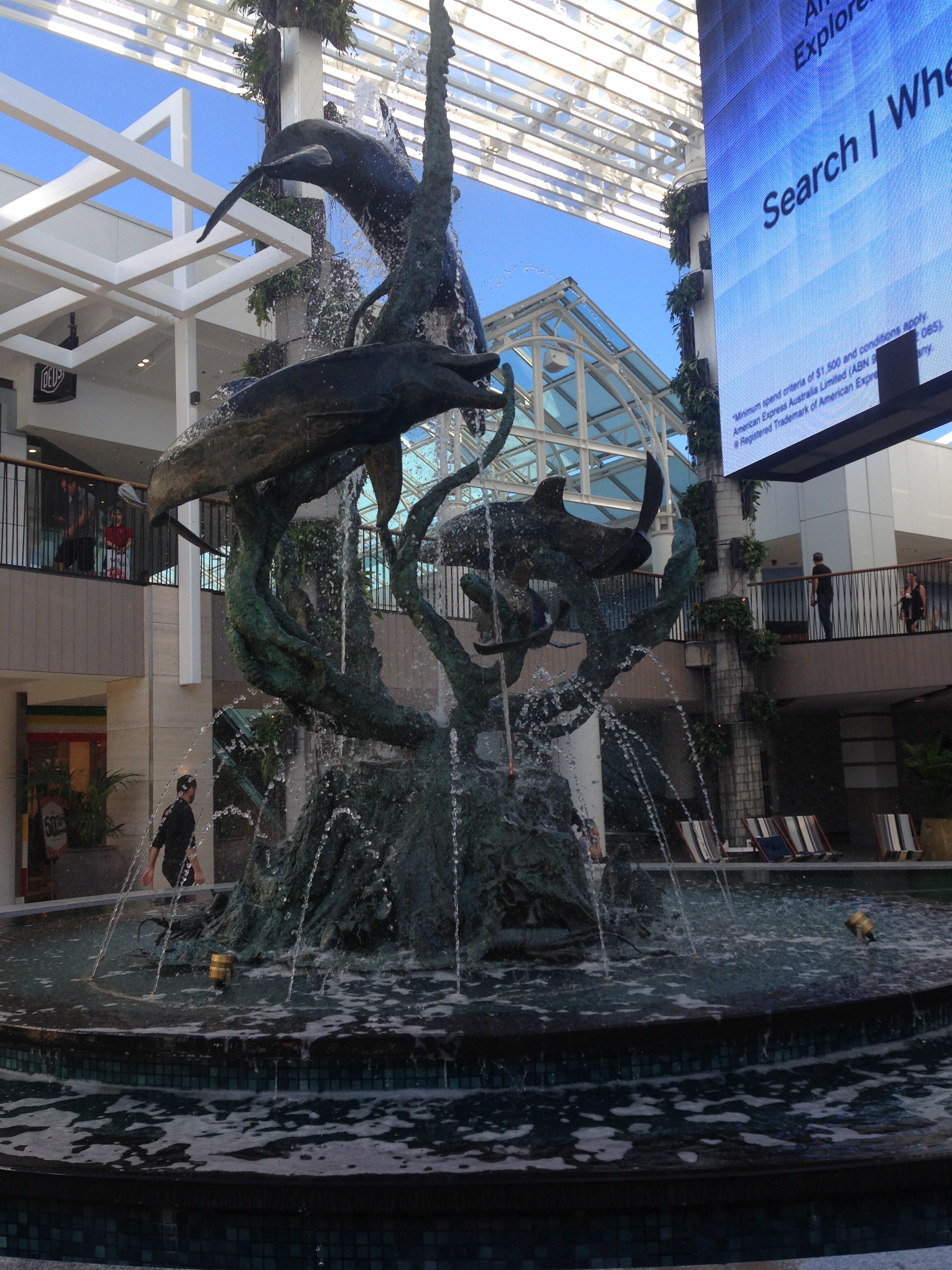
"Pacific Family" by Victor Cusack (1988), at the centre court

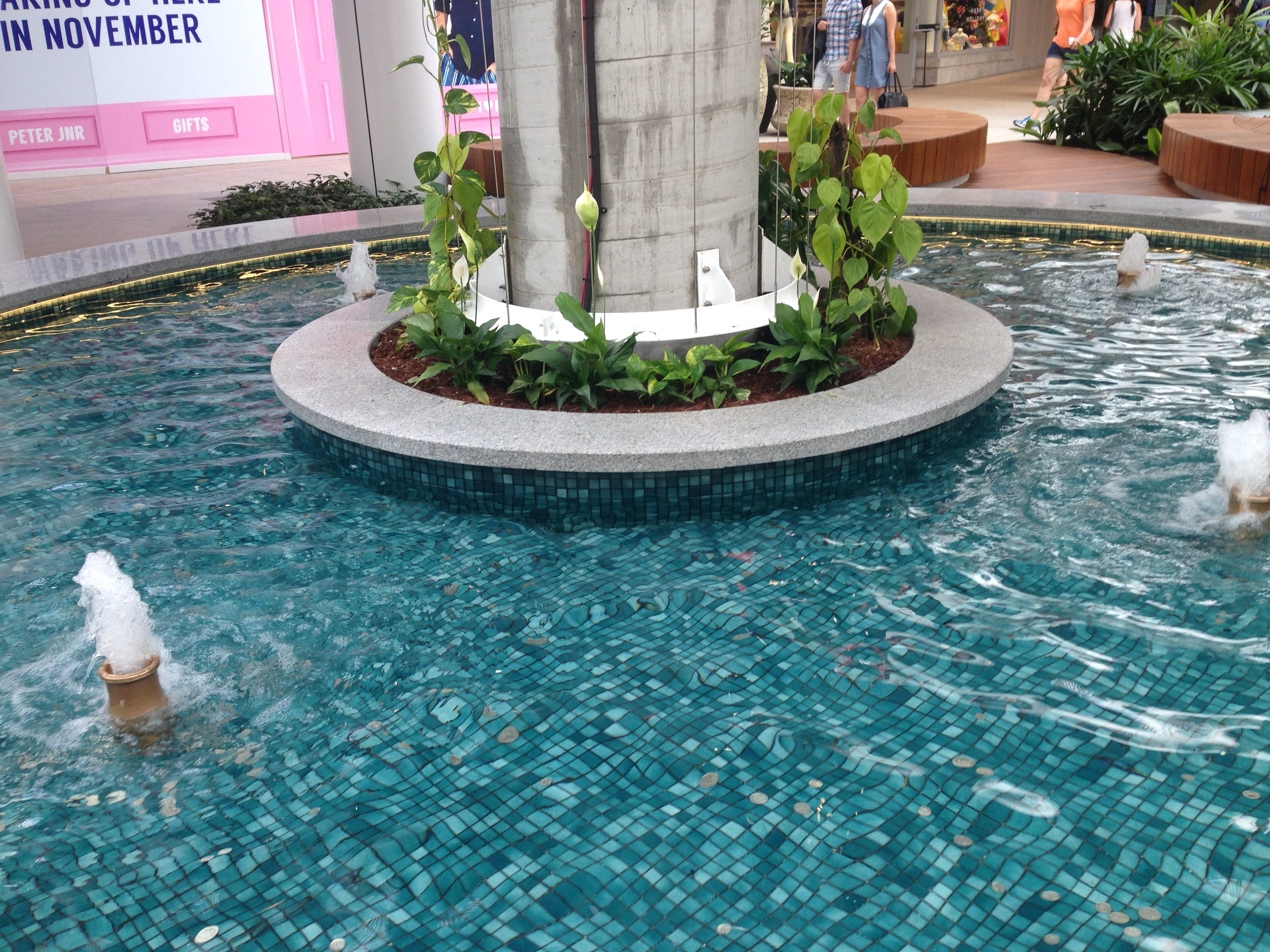
Another fountain at Westfield Warringah Mall

Westfield Warringah Mall (previously known as Warringah Mall; colloquially known as the Mall) is a large indoor/outdoor shopping centre in the suburb of Brookvale in the Northern Beaches region of Sydney.

== History ==
=== 20th century ===
==== 1950s: purchase of land and development plans ====
In 1957 L.J. Hooker purchased land which had previously been part of William Frederick Parker’s Brookvale Farm and also the eight acres owned by the Malcolm Family. Brookvale House was located on the site of the eight acres owned by the Malcom family and was occupied by Jane Try (née Malcolm) until 1957 when it was sold as part of the Warringah Mall development. The idea of a major shopping centre in Brookvale faced skepticism amongst the general public. The first application development for Warringah Mall was refused at a Warringah Council meeting on 9 November 1959 as some councilors feared that Brookvale would become a ‘ghost town’.

New plans for Warringah Mall were submitted to Warringah Council and was subsequently approved on 20 November 1959. Hooker-Rex Pty Ltd, on behalf of the Kanadah Pty Ltd were given town planning approval in to develop a regional shopping centre on the site.

The new proposal included a two-storey department store with a total floor area of 80,000 square feet, a 15,000 square feet chain store, 10 shops of 500 square feet each and 15 shops of 1000 square feet each all grouped around a pedestrian mall linked with covered walkways.

Hammerson Group purchased the site from L.J. Hooker in 1961 and acquired a further 4ha to allow for further expansion.

==== 1960s: opening ====
Warringah Mall opened on 4 April 1963 and was developed by Hammerson Group at a cost of £6 million. It was the second largest Australian shopping centre at the time with Chadstone Shopping Centre being the largest.

Warringah Mall opened with around 50 including a two-level (later three-level) David Jones department store with a supermarket on the ground level, a Grace Bros Homemakers Store, Nock & Kirby hardware store, a Franklins supermarket and a Woolworths supermarket.

During the early 60s saw many well-known musicians perform in the central courtyard area. In the green area outside the Grace Bros Homemakers store featured a circus with pony rides. The intersection of Condamine Street and Pittwater Road featured a mini golf course.

In August 1969 Warringah Mall purchased a clock from the Sydney City Council for $40. The clock was previously located in Martin Place during WW2 when the GPO Clock tower had to be taken down. After the war the clock tower was re-installed and the Martin Place clock later became redundant. Warringah Mall management spent $350 to fix the clock and placed it in a garden courtyard.

==== 1970s: redevelopment, Woolworths fire and Hoyts opening ====
The first major development occurred in 1972 with the Grace Bros store upgraded from a homemakers store to a three-level department store. The new three-level Grace Bros department store and the addition of a second level with 50 speciality stores were opened in 1973. When the new Grace Bros store opened it had a full cafeteria/restaurant on the top floor and an outside staircase which was used for fashion shows.

On 20 November 1973, a fire broke out in the original Woolworths store at around 3:42pm. About 30 shoppers inside the store were all able evacuate. The fire was believed to have started in the roof store's third level plant room. The blaze caused significant damage to the Woolworths building and two women who were employees of the store were trapped inside the store's pay office. Due to the size of the blaze and the fear of civilians trapped. Multiple code red messages were sent through to Headquarters with the arrival of the first crew from Dee Why and then brigades from Narrabeen, Crows Nest and Mosman and later additional crews from the Headquarters, The Rocks, and Neutral Bay to tackle the blaze. Despite the blaze threatening to spread to nearby stores and eventually the whole shopping mall, only 60% of the Woolworths building was on fire. Several firefighters desperately attempted to locate and rescue the two women who had been trapped inside the store. The rescue attempts had been unsuccessful due to the heat from the flames and the structure itself collapsing. By 5:49pm the Woolworths building was utterly destroyed and left to smoldering ruins. Three firefighters and a civilian were taken to Manly Hospital due to injuries caused by the fire, but all were later discharged. Altogether 14 officers, 46 firefighters using 3 pumpers, 1 set of ladders and 7 internal hydrants tackled the destructive blaze. The search for the two women trapped inside the store resumed after the blaze was over and unfortunately both did not survive. The first body found at 6:40pm and the second body found two hours later.

On 13 December 1979 the Hoyts Twin Cinema complex opened with the screening of The Muppet Movie and Alien.

==== 1980s: BMX Bandits film location, Target opening, Australian Bicentenary and Hoyts refurbishment ====
Warringah Mall was the film location in the 1983 movie BMX Bandits. The film starred a 15-year-old Nicole Kidman in one of her first major screen roles. In the scenes filmed at Warringah Mall showcases two young BMX experts, P.J. (Angelo D'Angelo) and Goose (James Lugton) getting chased by the bank robbers forcing them to ride through the mall and perform stunts on their BMX bikes. They then crash into a line of supermarket trolleys being collected by Judy (Nicole Kidman) who was working as a trolley collector.

In the mid-1980s, a Target store was opened along with 20 specialty stores.

To commemorate the Australian Bicentenary, Warringah Shire Council commissioned local sculptor Victor Cusack to create a bronze sculpture central fountain for the mall. The sculpture on the fountain is known as "Pacific Family" or "Dolphin Fountain" and was unveiled by Deputy Shire President Julie Sutton on 23 November 1988. The unveiling was followed by performances from Tommy Tycho’s band, Julie Anthony and Barry Crocker.

The Hoyts Twin Cinemas closed on 10 July 1989 for refurbishment which included the addition of five new screens and was scheduled to reopen by Christmas 1989. However, due to delays in construction the new Hoyts seven-screen multiplex opened on the 13 January 1990 with the premiere attraction Postcards from the Edge.

==== 1990s: sale and redevelopment ====
In September 1994, Warringah Mall was included in the sale of Hammerson's Australian property portfolio. The AMP Society, Bankers Trust Australia and Suncorp Group were shortlisted to battle it out for the purchase of Warringah Mall. AMP Society purchased Warringah Mall for $544 million in October 1994.

On 29 May 1996 it was revealed that AMP Society has proposed $139 million three stage redevelopments of Warringah Mall. It was designed by prominent US-based architects Altoon & Porter alongside local architects Roger J. Thrum & Associates. The redevelopment proposal was to be developed around the large centre court with the open layout retained. A new air-conditioned two-level mall anchored by a newly relocated Woolworths supermarket built on the existing mall to connect to the centre court was proposed. The redevelopment also included a discount department store, a second full-line supermarket and six mini-majors and a further 133 speciality stores would be added which would boost the total number of stores to 273. The redevelopment planned to bring the total floor area from 97,300m² to 125,800m². Work on the redevelopment was expected to begin in late 1996 with completion by the first half of 1999.

In August 1996 Harvey Norman closed its store and relocated to its newly built 12,000m² superstore in Balgowlah. This is the same move that happened months earlier with the store at Westfield Miranda closed and relocated to the newly built Caringbah Super Centre in Taren Point.

In November 1996 the $139 million three stage redevelopment was approved by Warringah Shire Council and the works began in early 1997.

The first stage of the redevelopment was completed in March 1998 and included the opening of the northern wing - a new air-conditioned two-level mall anchored by a Big W discount department store on level one, a new Woolworths supermarket and liquor store on the ground level and the total number of stores to 230.

Stage two of the redevelopment was officially opened in December 1999 and included a new southern wing with 60 new speciality stores, a new Coles supermarket on the ground level, a 700-seat Arena Cove food court alongside McDonald's, Rebel Sport and Surf Dive ‘n' Ski on level one, a new entertainment precinct on level two which included expanded Hoyts cinema complex, Galaxy World arcade, Warringah Mall Library, a community centre, Arena Terrace and Peninsula Room and as well as a new multi-storey carpark on Old Pittwater Road. This redevelopment brought the total floor area from 97,300m² to 125,800m².

=== 21st century ===
==== 2000s ====
The final works of the $139 million redevelopment were completed in 2000. The old areas had a makeover which was to introduce a quality homewares precinct with the opening of Wheel & Barrow and Dick Smith Powerhouse.

In June 2001 the Franklins supermarket was offered for sale and closed down before the end of that year. In that same year German global discount supermarket Aldi launched in Australia and was planning to open in the space vacated by Franklins. However, due to disputes between rival supermarkets Coles and Woolworths it was rejected by AMP Capital. In 2003 Aldi opened its store outside the centre on the corner of Cross and Green Streets.

On 21 March 2003, Westfield Group purchased a $200 million stake in the AMP Shopping Centre Trust (ART). On 20 May 2003, Westfield Trust has launched a $1.4 billion cash bid to the AMP Shopping Centre Trust (ART) to gain interests in another six shopping centres including Warringah Mall. By 22 July 2003, the ACCC decided not to intervene in the takeover offer and Westfield Group had acquired 25% ownership interest in Warringah Mall with AMP Capital retaining management control and 75% interest.

In early 2006 JB Hi-Fi opened its store on level one.

==== 2010s: ownership changes ====
On 25 October 2012, AMP Capital, Westfield Group and Westfield Retail Trust have completed a $1.75 billion shopping centre transaction. As part of the transaction, Westfield Group had acquired $344 million worth of assets from AMP Capital which included the purchase of a 12.5% interest in Warringah Mall.

As a result of the purchase, AMP Capital and Westfield Group have swapped interests in seven centres, including Warringah Mall which became a 50/50 joint venture between the two companies. As part of the deal, centre management transferred from AMP to Westfield with the centre rebranded to Westfield Warringah Mall.

On 30 June 2014, Westfield Group was restructured into two new independent companies known as Scentre Group and Westfield Corporation. Scentre Group manages and owns the company's interests in Australia and New Zealand. As a result of the restructure Scentre Group has taken over the interest of Westfield Warringah Mall from the Westfield Group.

==== 2015–2016 Redevelopment ====
In January 2015, in preparation for the $310 million redevelopment up to ten stores were closed and relocated. Around that time Myer began its refurbishment, shrinking from three levels to two. The store continued to trade during the refurbishment until February 2016 when it temporarily closed to allow for works to continue.

Stage one of the $310 million redevelopment began in August 2015 with the closure and relocation of stores and hoardings were erected around the centre court area. During the redevelopment the outdoor carpark known as the Palm Tree carpark, which was closest to Woolworths and Big W alongside Cross Street has closed. The multi-level carpark known as the Starfish Carpark between Myer and Woolworths and Big W had partially closed with demolition works taking place.

As part of the $310 million redevelopment, the stormwater drainage was upgraded to prevent flooding in preparation for the next one-in-100-year rain event. Since Warringah Mall was built over Brookvale Creek in 1963, the risk of flooding was high and that Brookvale Creek would overflow where it enters the drainage system and inundate the centre and nearby properties in Green and Cross streets. The stormwater upgrade includes the installation of twin box culverts under a number of the carparks from the multi-level carpark under construction on Cross Street to the outdoor carpark known as Crab Carpark on Condamine Street. The works also included the demolition of the former Sizzler restaurant building which previously housed a HCF and the former Pizza Hut restaurant building which housed an abandoned Godfather's Pizza restaurant and the outdoor carpark was expanded.

Stage one of the $310 million redevelopment was completed in June 2016. Westfield Warringah Mall unveiled its 1200 spaces five-level car park and a new fresh food court which was opened by My Kitchen Rules 2015 winners Will and Steve on 30 June 2016.

Stage two of the redevelopment was completed by November 2016 with the grand opening on 17 November 2016. The two-level Myer was officially opened by Australian model Jennifer Hawkins.

This stage two development features two new mini majors a two-level H&M, Cotton On Mega and an Anaconda store, a new two-level parallel mall linking Myer and the existing centre (built over an existing carpark) and a new refurbished centre court with a new look "Pacific Family" fountain and a water feature and a surfboard-inspired sculpture known as "Whitewash" (made from 43 chrome surfboards) by Laura Enever outside Myer. 70 new stores (including 50 fashion stores including H&M and Sephora) were added to the centre.

==== 2018 redevelopment proposal ====
On 5 October 2018, plans for the $226 million redevelopment to add a new cinema, restaurants and parking were revealed. This proposal labelled as stage two of an upgrade to the centre will include a new relocated Hoyts Cinema on level 3 above the northwest restaurant precinct as part of a new dining and entertainment hub. An additional 35 food outlets including licensed premises, 15 specialty retailers, 10 small outlets and one major store will be part of the three-level centre. The existing food court on level 1 will be expanded to the south with addition of six food court outlets and the restaurant precinct on level two will feature views overlooking Brookvale Creek and the Warringah golf course. This development would add an additional 10,000sqm of extra retail space.

The redevelopment will add modifications to the existing Target store and a row of speciality stores from Green Street entrance to the Coles supermarket end on the ground level are also planned. The number of parking spaces will increase to a total of 5,093. This development follows the 2008 master plan of the centre. A 14-month timeline has been estimated for completion of the project. The plans for the centre had been decided in May and on 21 November 2019 it was revealed that there had been changes in the building heights. The proposed building heights have been dropped by 4.8 metres and step the design away from its southern edge with Old Pittwater Road.

On 3 May 2019, IKEA opened its first ever small format Planning Studio store on level one near JB Hi-Fi. The store is different to the company’s traditional large warehouse-style stores and instead offers a digital home planning studio which staff guidance.

==== 2020s ====
In March 2021, work began on modifications to the existing Target store and a row of speciality stores from Green Street entrance to the Coles supermarket end on the ground level. On 15 May 2021 Target closed its store and was replaced by Kmart discount department store which opened on 3 June 2021. On 30 June 2021, Country Growers fruit shop and the adjoining Red Lea Chickens outlet closed and work begun on the addition of travelators which will provide a new entrance to the Orange carpark, Hoyts, food court and the ground level between Coles and Kmart. The old Country Growers space was to be taken over by Harris Farm Markets, however it did not eventuate and the space remained vacant until 2024.

On 18 November 2021, Dexus Wholesale Property Fund (DWPF) acquired the remaining 25% interest from AMP Capital for around $410 million. The acquisition was settled in December 2021 and marks the end of AMP Capital’s 27-years involvement of the centre.

In November 2022, David Jones reduced its floor space from three levels to two and the store was refurbished. The top floor of the store closed and a $20 million redevelopment was proposed. The proposal included one new tenancy on ground floor and two new tenancies above on level two including a co-working space and a gym. A new pedestrian bridge to the level two carpark was to be built and a new roof with skylights to be built over the row of shops between David Jones and Kmart. Later, on 11 November 2026, David Jones and its receivers announced that their store in the centre would close alongside 18 other stores nationwide and in New Zealand, with the closure expected to occur after the Christmas shopping season.

On 20 March 2024, TK Maxx opened its store on the ground level next to Kmart. Four months later Farmers Fresh opened on the old space of Country Growers on 20 July 2024.

On 1 December 2025, Bunnings closed its store as a result of the opening of the nearby five-storey Bunnings Warehouse in Frenchs Forest. The former Bunnings building is set to be demolished for a mixed-use development with a 34-storey residential tower.

== Future ==
On 7 March 2025, Scentre Group sought a rezoning approval from the NSW Government's newly established Housing Delivery Authority (HDA) to build up to 1,500 residential dwellings at Westfield Warringah Mall as part of its State Significant Development.

On 10 September 2025, Scentre Group had revealed its detailed plans to build eight residential and commercial towers ranging from 12 to 39 storeys with up to 1,500 apartments, around 2,500 car spaces and 6,900 m^{2} (74,000 sq ft) of public open space. A proposal was released to create a new town square near the current B-line stop on Pittwater Road.

Stage one of the proposal will be to construct two mixed-use towers on the northern edge of the site. This will see the demolition of the existing medical centre, former Bunnings building, Supercheap Auto, Anytime Fitness, El Jannah and the loss of 450 car spaces. Proposed tower one will include a 34-storey residential tower with up to 350 apartments and include retail, food and beverage outlets as well as community facilities such as a library and five-storey parking podium on the site of the former Bunnings.

Proposed tower two will include 19-storey residential tower and include non-residential uses such as commercial offices, retail and parking within the podium. It will be located on the site of the car park area behind Aldi.

Stage one works will also include a 2,040m² town square to provide a connection between the B-Line bus stop and Westfield Warringah Mall and will include areas for play, recreation and outdoor seating. This proposal sits alongside Northern Beaches Council's Brookvale Structure Plan.

Other stages include four towers on the eastern edge along Condamine Street and Pittwater Road and three towers on Old Pittwater Road opposite Northern Beaches TAFE College.

David Jones will close its store by the end of 2026.

== Tenants ==
Westfield Warringah Mall has 131,589m² of floor space. The major retailers include David Jones, Myer, Big W, Kmart, Coles, Woolworths, Cotton On, H&M, TK Maxx, JB Hi-Fi, Rebel, Anaconda and Hoyts Cinema

== Transport ==
Westfield Warringah Mall has bus connections to the Sydney CBD, Lower North Shore and the Northern Beaches, as well as local surrounding suburbs operated by Keolis Northern Beaches. There is also a regular service to the nearby Frenchs Forest and Belrose regions operated by CDC NSW. The majority of the bus services are located on Pittwater Road and the bus interchange inside the centre.

Westfield Warringah Mall also has multi-level car parks with 4,650 spaces.

== Incidents and accidents ==
- On 29 August 1969, security guard Joseph Charles Coffman was shot and killed by an unknown assailant. It appeared that Coffman was attacked from behind with a blow to the neck, and then shot through the shoulder with what appeared to have been his own revolver. 17,000 cigarettes were found at the scene, so Coffman may have interrupted a robbery in progress. Les Howarth, a 15 year old youth of Balgowlah, accompanied Coffman on his patrol, who was asleep in the security service car at the time of the shooting. A vehicle was seen speeding away from the mall, and a stolen car was found abandoned 17 kilometres away in Ku-ring-gai Chase National Park. On April 13, 1970, three men Mick Zdrauko Sormaz 24, John Laurence Stout 23 and Graham Peter Bell 22 were convicted of murdering Coffman and were sentenced to life imprisonment. Police stated that Coffman had been shot with a 22 sawn-off rifle and his own 38 revolver.
- On 2 May 2012, a man was fatally stabbed at a bus stop at around 11:40pm. He was given first aid before paramedics arrived and he was taken to the Royal North Shore Hospital. He was declared dead on arrival. A 25-year-old male had been arrested but found not guilty due to mental illness.
- On 23 June 2015, a security guard was almost set on fire by a man who was high on ice. The security guard found the man slumped over on the stairs, unresponsive and with his eyes closed.
- On 21 April 2016, a section of the centre was evacuated following reports of a possible bomb threat at the construction site. Access to a small parking area was restricted and the construction site was evacuated from the area at the north of the site, but shoppers were not affected.
- On 7 January 2019, a woman was stabbed by a teenage girl while trying to break up a fight at a nail salon at around 3:00 pm. Two teenage girls, aged 14 and 13, had an altercation when the woman intervened and suffered a knife injury to her arm. Paramedics treated the woman at the scene before being taken to Royal North Shore Hospital. The 13-year-old was later charged.
- On 22 April 2024, a 29-year-old man believed to be a worker fell 3 m (9.8 ft) from the awning over the walkway between two stores, landing face forward on the hard surface, breaking both his arms and hitting his head. He was taken to Royal North Shore Hospital for further treatment, the investigation is still underway to determine what had happened.

== See also ==
- List of shopping centres in Australia
