= Cromer, New South Wales =

Cromer
- Suburb
- Interactive map of Cromer
- Country: Australia
- State: New South Wales
- City: Sydney
- LGA: Northern Beaches Council
- Location: 20 km (12 mi) north-east of Sydney CBD

Government
  - State electorate: Wakehurst
  - Federal division: Mackellar
- Elevation: 19 m (62 ft)

Population
  - Total: 8,030 (2021 census)
- Postcode: 2099
Suburbs around Cromer
Ingleside	Wheeler Heights	Collaroy Plateau
Beacon Hill	Cromer	Collaroy
Oxford Falls	Narraweena	Dee Why

Cromer is a suburb of northern Sydney, in the state of New South Wales, Australia. Cromer is 20 kilometres north-east of the Sydney central business district, in the local government area of Northern Beaches Council and is part of the Northern Beaches region. Cromer is bordered to the north-east by Narrabeen Lagoon.

== History ==
Cromer is named after the seaside town of Cromer, in Norfolk, England. The area had been known as Dee Why West but it was changed after Dee Why Golf Links was taken over by the Cromer Country Club in 1940. The club applied to have the area's name changed to Cromer and permission was granted to create the new suburb.

Cromer Post Office opened on 1 September 1959, and closed in 1992.

== Education ==
Cromer Public School (K-6) and Northern Beaches Secondary College Cromer Campus (7-12) are the two public schools in the suburb.

The education status of people living in Cromer is Infants/Primary (7%), Secondary Education (6%), Technical or Further Education (4%), University or other Tertiary Institution (3%) and Not Attending (Working) (78%).

== Cromer Heights ==
Cromer Heights is an unbounded "urban place" located on the high ground of south-west Cromer identified by the Geographical Names Board of New South Wales.

== Sport and recreation ==
Cromer is home to a number of parks and reserves, including Cromer Park, Truman Reserve, Wambiri Place Reserve, St Matthews Farm Reserve, Dee Why West Recreation Reserve, James Morgan Reserve and Inman Park. The parks are home to a variety of sports throughout the year, such as Rugby League, soccer, rugby union, touch football, baseball, softball and cricket.

Warringah archers, located next to the Cromer High School, is a long-standing archery club that hosts tournaments for archers from all over Sydney.

Cromer Cricket Club fields teams in the MWJCA and MWCA competitions.

The Cromer Golf Club which features the Arcus Tributary meandering across its fairways into Narrabeen Lagoon is the pinnacle sporting facility in the suburb.

== Dee Why West Recreation Reserve ==
Dee Why West Recreation Reserve is located between Cromer Heights and Wakehurst Parkway. The reserve is a popular destination of bush walking, trail bike riding and mountain bike riding.

In recent years there have been several attempts by private property developers to turn the reserve into a housing estate. Warringah Council has denied any further development of the reserve citing population decline and environmental factors.

== Population ==
In the 2021 census, there were 8,030 people in Cromer. 72.2% of people were born in Australia. The most common other countries of birth were England 6.5%, New Zealand 2.0% and Italy 1.4%. 83.6% of people spoke only English at home. Other languages spoken at home included Italian at 1.7%. The most common responses for religion were No Religion 39.6%, Catholic 26.7% and Anglican 15.3%.
