= Northern Sydney =

Region of New South Wales, Australia

- Region
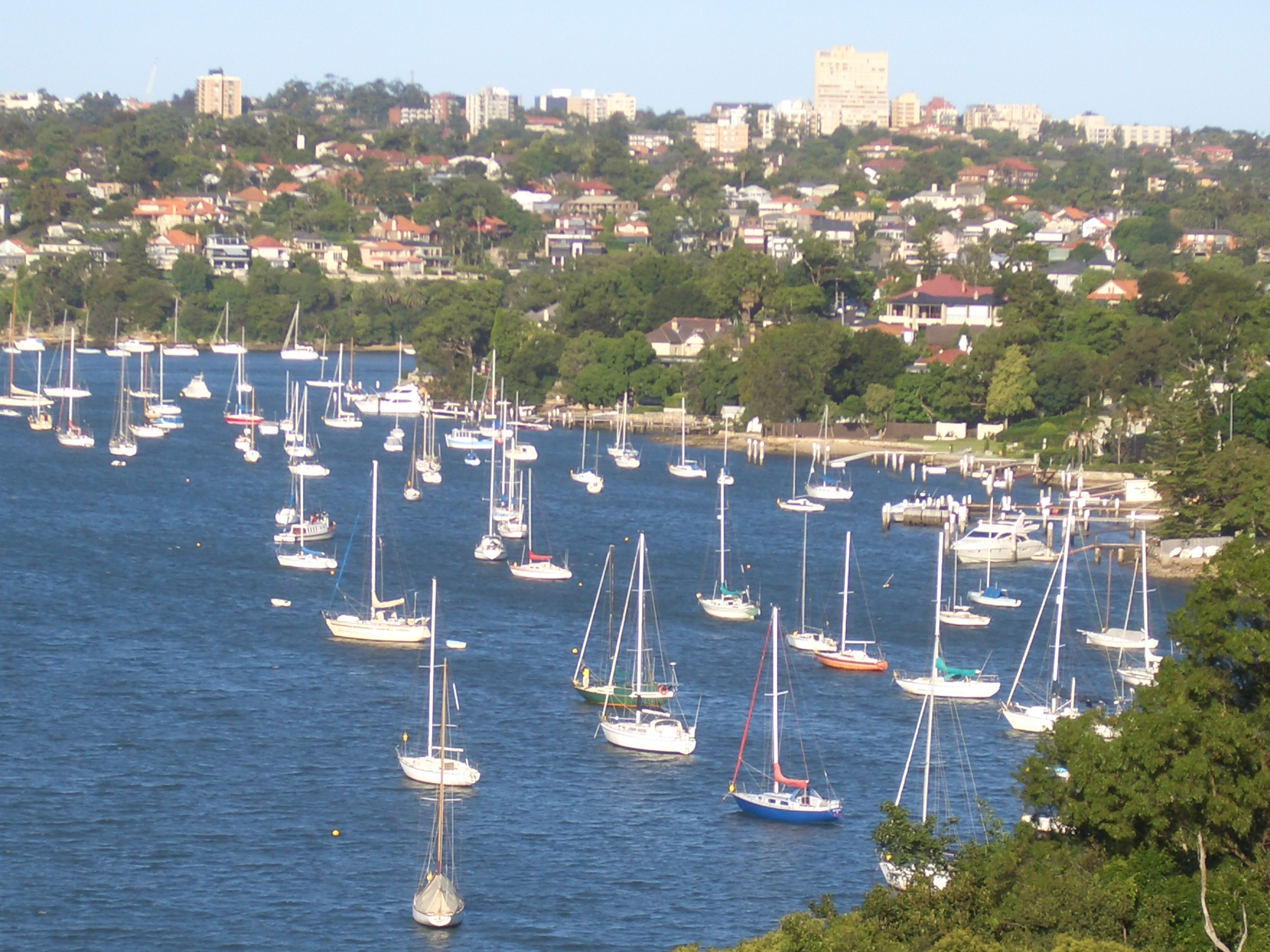
- Parramatta River at Hunters Hill
- Country: Australia
- State: New South Wales
- LGA: Hornsby Shire; City of Willoughby; Ku-ring-gai Council; Municipality of Hunter's Hill; City of Ryde; Municipality of Lane Cove; Municipality of Mosman; North Sydney Council; Northern Beaches Council; City of Parramatta (parts of)

Government
  - State electorate: Davidson; Epping; Ku-ring-gai; Lane Cove; North Shore; Ryde; Willoughby; Manly; Wakehurst; Pittwater
  - Federal division: Bennelong; Mackellar; Warringah; Berowra; Bradfield; North Sydney
- Time zone: UTC+10 (AEST)
  - Summer (DST): UTC+11 (AEDT)
Regions around Northern Sydney
Hills District	Forest District	Northern Beaches
Greater Western Sydney	Northern Sydney	North Shore
Parramatta River	Parramatta River	Parramatta River

Northern Sydney is a large metropolitan region in Greater Sydney, New South Wales, Australia on the north shore of Sydney Harbour and Parramatta River. The region embraces suburbs in Sydney's north-east, north and inner north west. Northern Sydney is divided into distinctive regions such as the North Shore, Northern Beaches and Forest District.

The region is characterised by pristine waterways with immense greenery, a well-planned public transport system, hilly roads, large plots of manicured land, and substantially large federation and bungalow style homes. Northern Sydney is home to some of Sydney's most affluent suburbs, large parks and notable landmarks, in addition to having the leafiest suburbs in the metropolitan area.

== History ==
The western end of Northern Sydney was home to the Wallumettagal (Ryde-Hunters Hill and western Lane Cove) tribe. The first settlement in the north and in fact the third-earliest in Australia, after Sydney and Parramatta, was at Ryde; then known by the Aboriginal name Wallumetta. The territory from Sydney Cove to Parramatta, on the northern side of the Parramatta River, was thought to be that of the Wallumedegal, and had the aboriginal name Wallumetta, the territory of the Wallumede people.

On 3 January 1792, the first land in the Ryde area was granted to eight marines, along the northern bank of the river between Sydney and Parramatta. The area was named by Governor Phillip the "Field of Mars", Mars being the Roman god of war, named to reflect the military association with these new settlers. Today's Field of Mars Reserve is the remnant of a district which once extended from Dundas to the Lane Cove River. Soon after, these grants were followed by grants to ten emancipated convicts in February 1792, the land being further to the east of the marines grants, thus the area was called Eastern Farms or the Eastern Boundary. The name Eastern Farms then changed to Kissing Point by 1794; a name believed to have originated from the way heavily laden boats passing the Parramatta River bumped or "kissed" the rocky outcrop which extends into the river of Kissing Point today.

Further grants were issued in 1794 and 1795, gradually occupying most of the foreshores between Meadowbank and Gladesville. Some of the grants were at the North Brush, north of the Field of Mars settlement, in the area of Brush Farm and Eastwood. Most of the Grants were small, from 12 to 40 hectares (30 to 100 acres).

By 1803, most of the accessible land had been granted. Settlement was based along the Parramatta River and overlooking ridges. Governor King recognised that most of the smaller settlers had insufficient land for their stock but it was not possible to grant them larger allotments. In 1804, it was decided that a 'traditional English common' – a large area of public land for use by local inhabitants – would be set aside. Six commons were gazetted. In 1804, an area of 6000 acres of the Field of Mars was decreed as a common. The common stretched from what is now Hunters Hill, through Ryde to Pennant Hills, incorporating a large tract of forest around the Lane Cove River. It was intended as a resource for small settlers, a place for them to graze their livestock and collect firewood, to supplement their farming practices.

The Field of Mars Connect, an area of approximately 2,040 hectares (5,000 acres) located north of the Field of Mars and the Eastern Farms, covered most of the Ryde municipality. The village itself comprised only a modest scattering of houses in a few streets around the church, surrounded by farms, orchards and some large estates. Nevertheless, the name was well established by 12 November 1870 when the Municipal district of Ryde was officially proclaimed.

== Suburbs and Regions of Northern Sydney ==
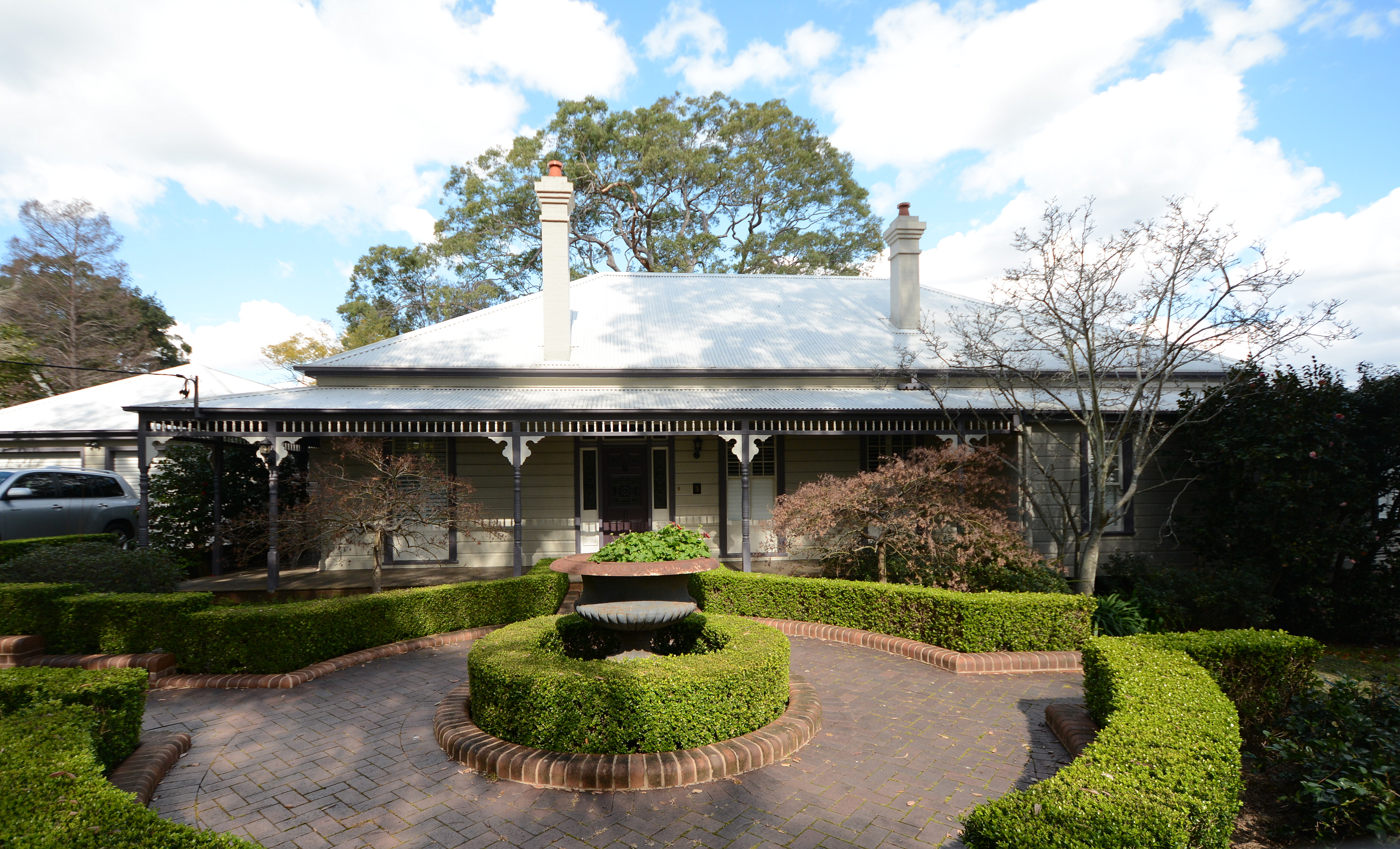
Suburban home in Beecroft

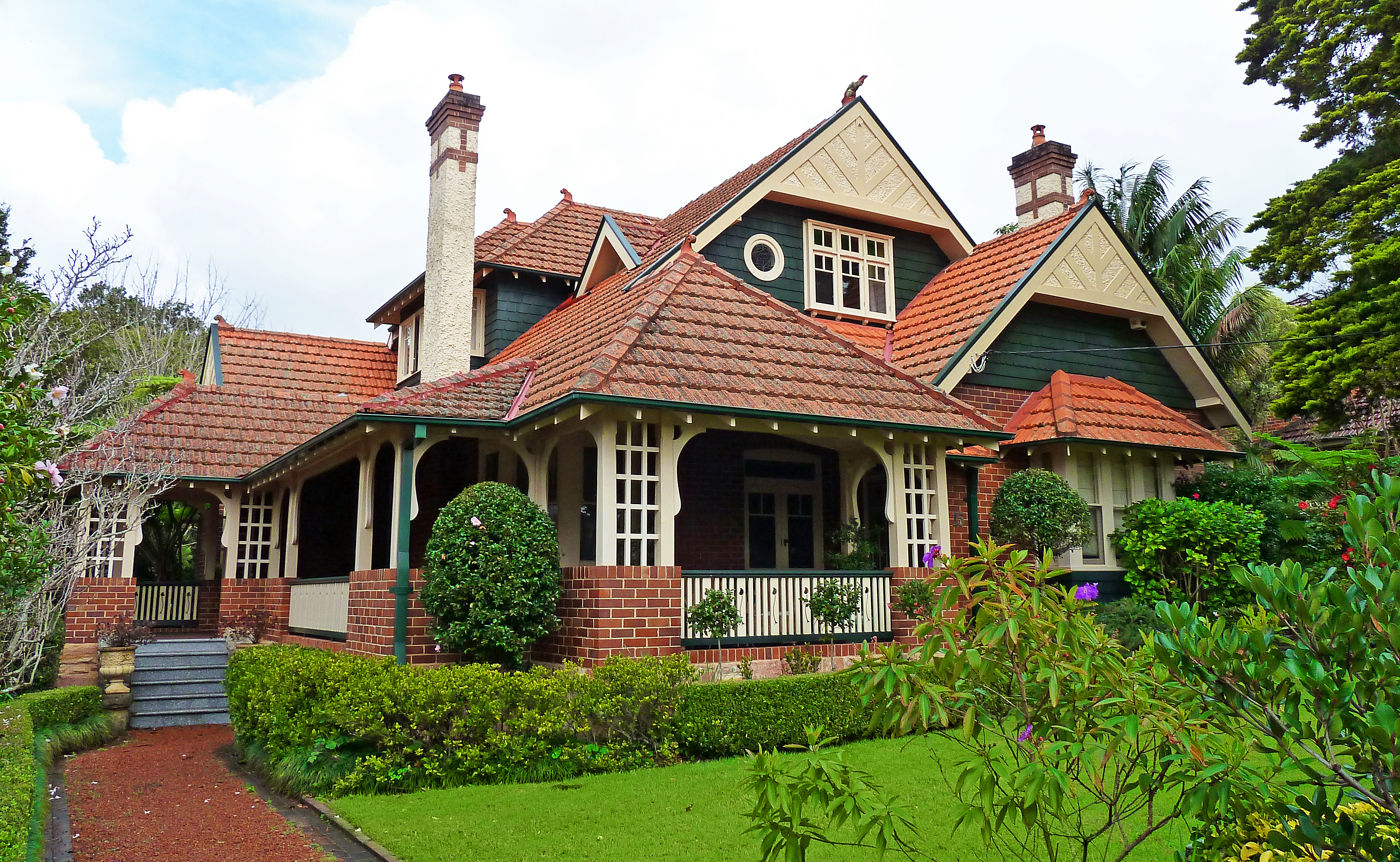
Federation bungalow in Killara

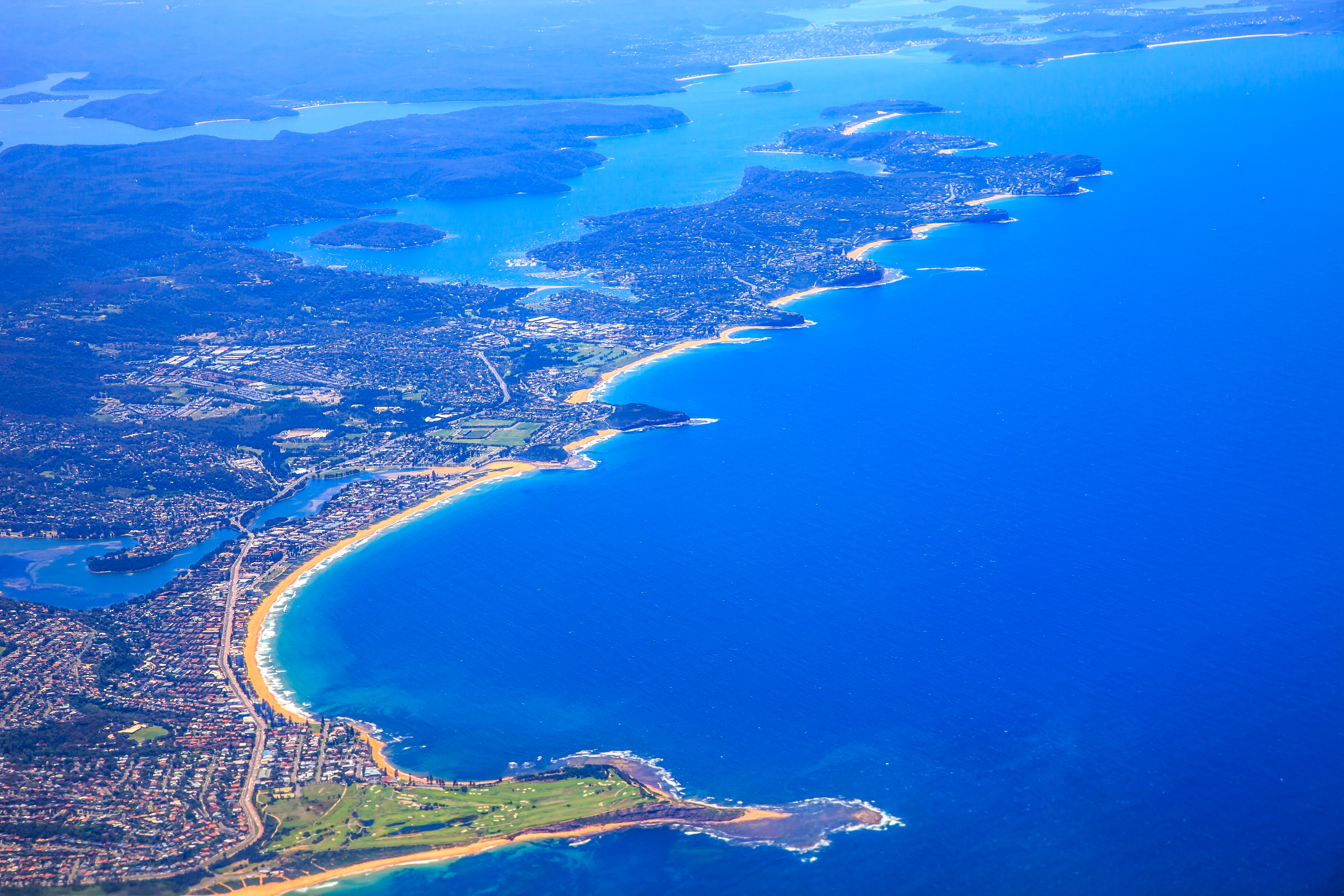
Coast of the Northern Beaches

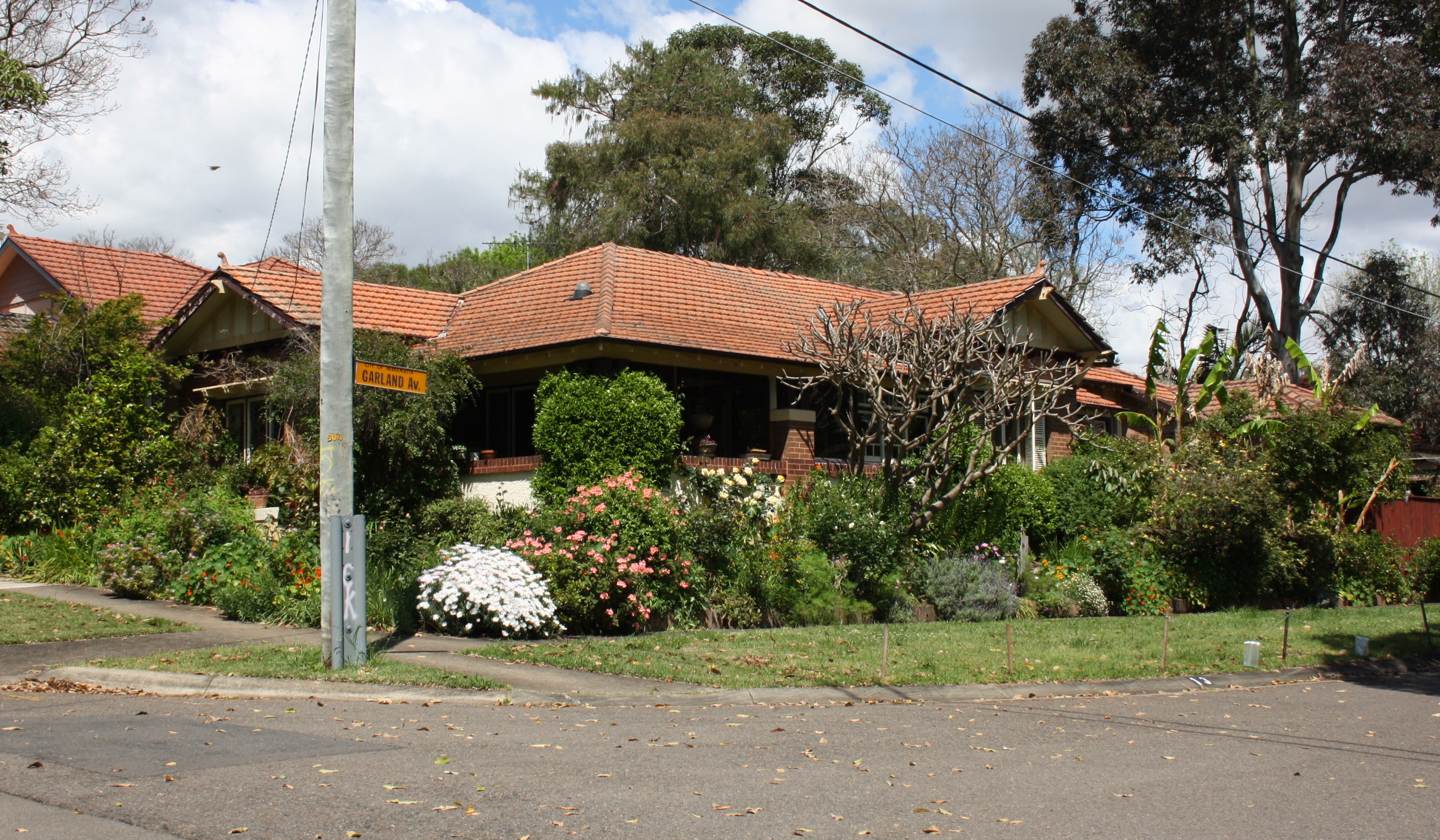
A leafy property in Epping

Northern Sydney is described as the area between Port Jackson to the south, Carlingford and suburbs in line to the west/northwest, Hawkesbury River and Pittwater to the north and the Tasman Sea to the east.

=== Regions ===
Northern Sydney is made up of several overlapping cultural geographical regions including the North Shore, the Northern Beaches and The Northern Districts. The cultural terminology means these areas do not always correspond to local government or statistical boundaries. Despite the region being divided by distinctive definitions, parts of the region are often simply referred to as "Northern Suburbs", "Northern Districts", "North" or "North West", most notably the inner north-western suburbs to the west of the Lane Cove River, such as Epping, Ryde, Melrose Park and Meadowbank. The wider expression Northern Suburbs can refer to varied ideas on what this encompasses; for example, the Northern Suburbs Football Association covers communities from North Sydney through the North Shore to the Hawkesbury River.

==== North Shore ====
The North Shore generally refers to suburbs located on the northern side of Sydney Harbour up to Hornsby, and suburbs between Middle Harbour and the Lane Cove River. Further to this, the region can be broken up into the Lower North Shore and Upper North Shore.

The "Lower North Shore" usually refers to the land that is located to the north of the Sydney Harbour Bridge, between Lane Cove River and Middle Harbour and as far north as Boundary Street, Roseville, or all suburbs within the local government areas of Mosman Council, City of Willoughby, Municipality of Lane Cove, North Sydney Council, Municipality of Hunter's Hill and some suburbs of City of Ryde. The Lower North Shore roughly corresponds with the Parish of Willoughby, a cadastral unit used for land title purposes.

The "Upper North Shore" usually refers to all suburbs within the local government area of Ku-ring-gai, and a small area of Hornsby Shire, situated between Lane Cove National Park and Ku-ring-gai National Park, or suburbs between Boundary Street, Roseville and the M1 Motorway in Wahroonga. It is located to the north-west of the Sydney CBD. It roughly corresponds with the cadastral Parish of Gordon.

The Hornsby area centres on Hornsby, Waitara, Asquith and the railway corridor towards Berowra. It overlaps with some descriptions of the Upper North Shore. Hornsby Shire is considerably larger than this suburban and railway corridor, extending north to the Hawkesbury River and south towards Epping.

==== Northern Districts (Ryde–Epping area) ====
The Northern Districts is a term used for communities in Sydney's inner north-west, particularly in connection with Ryde, Eastwood, Epping and neighbouring suburbs. The core Ryde district lies largely north of the Parramatta River and west of the Lane Cove River, with centres including West Ryde, North Ryde, Marsfield, Macquarie Park and Meadowbank. Generally, this area corresponds to land subdivided with the development of the Northern Line Railway. The name is not associated with a single prescribed boundary, and historic sporting and community catchments have extended northwards into the Epping–Hornsby corridor, encompassing localities that may also be described as part of the Hills or Hornsby district. Other names for this area include Ryde-Eastwood, Ryde-Epping, inner north west, north west sydney or Macquarie area.

The first terminology for the area was the Field of Mars, a name applied to land grants made in 1792, and the Field of Mars Common, established in 1804. The common was described as being along the southern side of the Lane Cove River towards Pennant Hills, while Epping was within the historical Parish of Field of Mars. Epping railway station originally opened as Field of Mars in 1886. The regional name is used in the local press and sport, the Northern District Times developed from the Epping and District Times, the Northern District Cricket Club was formed following a meeting in Epping in 1924, and the Hornsby–Epping soccer association adopted the name Northern District Football Association in 1956. Macquarie Community College was formed in 1988 by amalgamating evening colleges in Carlingford, Eastwood and North Ryde. The National Parks Association of New South Wales also uses Northern Districts as a regional designation separate from the North Shore and the Hills District.

==== Northern Beaches ====
The Northern Beaches is on the coast and extends south to the entrance of Port Jackson (Sydney Harbour), west to Middle Harbour and north to the entrance of Broken Bay at Palm Beach. The Northern Beaches area is governed on a local level by the Northern Beaches Council. Its historical local districts include Manly in the south, Warringah across much of the central area, and Pittwater towards the northern peninsula and estuary. These were also the names of the three local government areas amalgamated to form Northern Beaches Council on 12 May 2016.

The Forest District, also known as the Forest Area, or the Forest, is a group of suburbs at the inland western side of the Northern Beaches, centred on Frenchs Forest, Forestville, Belrose, Davidson and Killarney Heights. It is commonly treated as a subregion of the Northern Beaches rather than a separate coastal region.

==== Hills District ====
The Hills District adjoins northern Sydney to the west and north-west, particularly around Carlingford, Pennant Hills, West Pennant Hills and Cherrybrook. Although generally classified with north-western Sydney, The Hills Shire has socioeconomic characteristics similar to more advantaged northern and eastern parts of Greater Sydney. The broader socioeconomic divide between Sydney's north-east and south-west is commonly described by the informal Latte Line, also known as the Red Rooster line, or a newer Yo-Chi line, based on the distribution of the frozen-yoghurt chain. These are informal cultural ideas.

==== Statistical Geography ====
The Australian Bureau of Statistics uses Statistical Area Level 4 (SA4) boundaries that are located in northern Sydney. These are:

- Sydney – Northern Beaches, covering the customary Northern Beaches region northeast of Middle Harbour and south of the Hawkesbury River;
- Sydney – North Sydney and Hornsby, covering the customary upper and lower North Shore regions southwest of Middle Harbour, northeast of the Lane Cove River and south of the Hawkesbury River; and
- Sydney – Ryde, covering the inner north-western region southwest of the Lane Cover River.

These classifications are used for census statistics and are not directly establishing the cultural or customary regions.

=== Suburbs and localities ===
This list is not exhaustive.

The suburbs and localities of the Northern Sydney region are:

- Allambie Heights
- Artarmon
- Asquith
- Avalon
- Balgowlah Heights
- Balgowlah
- Bayview
- Beacon Hill
- Belrose
- Bilgola
- Bilgola Plateau
- Brookvale
- Beecroft
- Berowra
- Berowra Heights
- Berowra Waters
- Brooklyn
- Carlingford
- Cammeray
- Castle Cove
- Castlecrag
- Chatswood
- Chatswood West
- Cheltenham
- Cherrybrook
- Cremorne
- Cremorne Point
- Crows Nest
- Church Point
- Clareville
- Clontarf
- Coasters Retreat
- Collaroy
- Collaroy Plateau
- Cottage Point
- Cowan
- Cromer
- Curl Curl
- Davidson
- Dee Why
- Denistone
- Denistone East
- Denistone West
- Duffys Forest
- East Killara
- East Lindfield
- East Ryde
- Eastwood
- Epping
- Elanora Heights
- Ermington
- Elvina Bay
- Fairlight
- Forestville
- Frenchs Forest
- Freshwater
- Gordon
- Great Mackerel Beach
- Greenwich
- Gladesville
- Henley
- Hornsby
- Huntleys Cove
- Huntleys Point
- Hunters Hill
- Ingleside
- Killara
- Killarney Heights
- Kirribilli
- Lane Cove
- Lane Cove North
- Lane Cove West
- Lavender Bay
- Lindfield
- Linley Point
- Longueville
- Lovett Bay
- Macquarie Park
- Manly
- Manly Vale
- Marsfield
- McMahons Point
- Meadowbank
- Melrose Park
- Middle Cove
- Milsons Point
- Mona Vale
- Morning Bay
- Mosman
- Mount Colah
- Mount Kuring-gai
- Naremburn
- Narrabeen
- Narraweena
- Neutral Bay
- Newport
- Normanhurst
- North Balgowlah
- North Curl Curl
- North Epping
- North Manly
- North Narrabeen
- North Ryde
- North Sydney
- North Turramurra
- North Wahroonga
- North Willoughby
- Northbridge
- Northwood
- Oxford Falls
- Palm Beach
- Pennant Hills
- Putney
- Pymble
- Queenscliff
- Roseville
- Roseville Chase
- Ryde
- Riverview
- St Ives
- St Ives Chase
- South Turramurra
- St Leonards
- Scotland Island
- Seaforth
- Terrey Hills
- Tennyson Point
- Thornleigh
- Turramurra
- Wahroonga
- Waitara
- Warrawee
- Warriewood
- Warringah
- Waverton
- Westleigh
- West Pennant Hills
- West Pymble
- West Ryde
- Whale Beach
- Wheeler Heights
- Willoughby
- Willoughby East
- Wollstonecraft
- Woolwich

== Culture and sport ==
Sporting representation in Northern Sydney often differs by areas of the region. In rugby league, the North Sydney Bears represent the North Shore, as well as much of the Hornsby area, whilst the Manly Warringah Sea Eagles represent the Northern Beaches and Forest District. The Ryde area lacks a specific rugby league team, but local teams compete in the Balmain District Junior Rugby League, feeding into the Wests Tigers development system.

In the main rugby union competition in Sydney the Shute Shield, Northern Sydney is very well represented,. On the North Shore, Gordon Rugby Club represents Chatswood and the Upper North Shore, whilst Northern Suburbs Rugby Club represents much of the Lower North Shore. Manly RUFC represents the Lower Northern Beaches, whilst the Warringah Rugby Club represents the Upper Northern Beaches. The Ryde area is represented by Eastwood Rugby Club. Many children from the area are sent to the elite private schools of Sydney and hold rugby union as the preferred code. Notable traditional 15 man code schools include Barker College, Knox Grammar School, St Joseph's College, Hunters Hill and Saint Ignatius' College, Riverview.

In NSW Premier Cricket, teams in Northern Sydney include Gordon District Cricket Club, Manly Warringah District Cricket Club,Mosman Cricket Club, Northern District Cricket Club (Waitara), and UTS North Sydney Cricket Club.

== Transport ==
Northern Sydney is very well serviced by public transport. Two railway lines operate through the region known as the North Shore railway line and the Northern railway line on the Sydney Trains network.

The Epping to Chatswood rail link which opened in 2009, crosses Northern Sydney from Chatswood to Epping. The link is now part of Sydney Metro Northwest.

There is also an abundance of bus routes serving the region operated by Busways, CDC NSW and Keolis Northern Beaches.

The southern part of this region is frequented by ferry services to the Sydney central business district and westbound towards Parramatta, as well as ferry services to the Sydney CBD from Manly.

The main arterial roads in Northern Sydney are Military Road, the Pacific Highway, the Warringah Freeway, Pennant Hills Road, Ryde Road, Epping Road, Mona Vale Road, Victoria Road, Beecroft Road, Pittwater Road and Wakehurst Parkway.

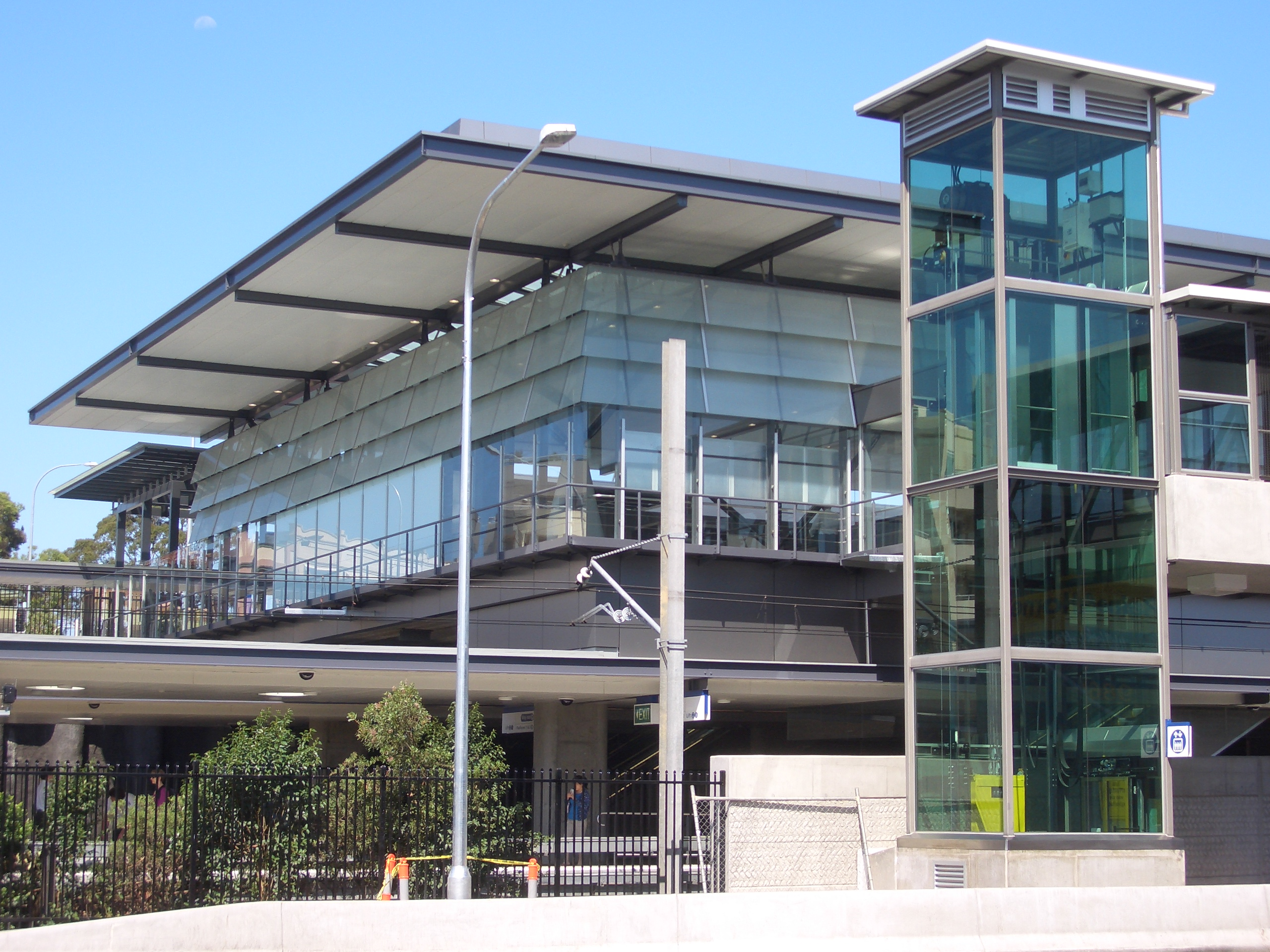
Epping railway station

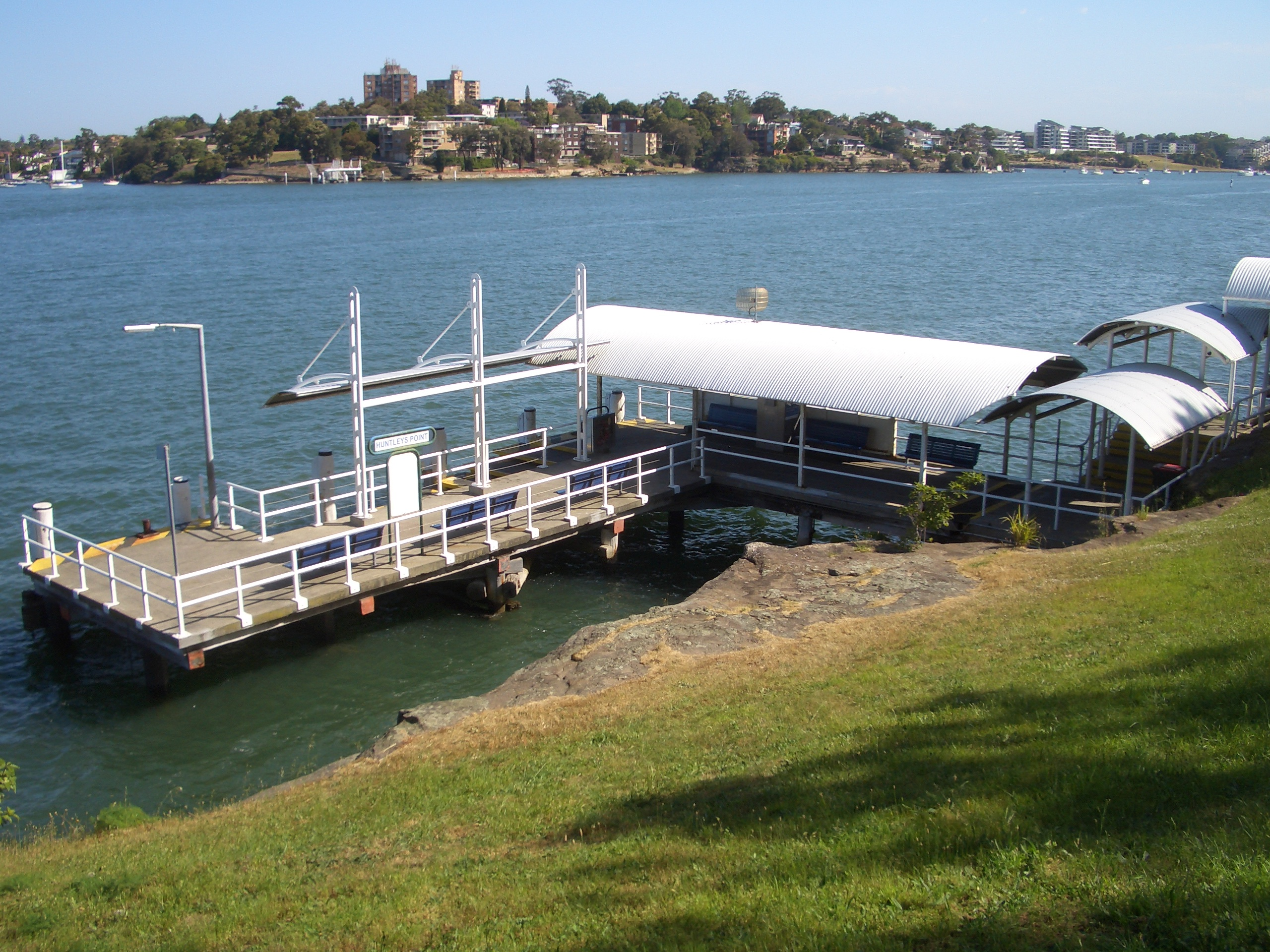
Huntleys Point ferry wharf

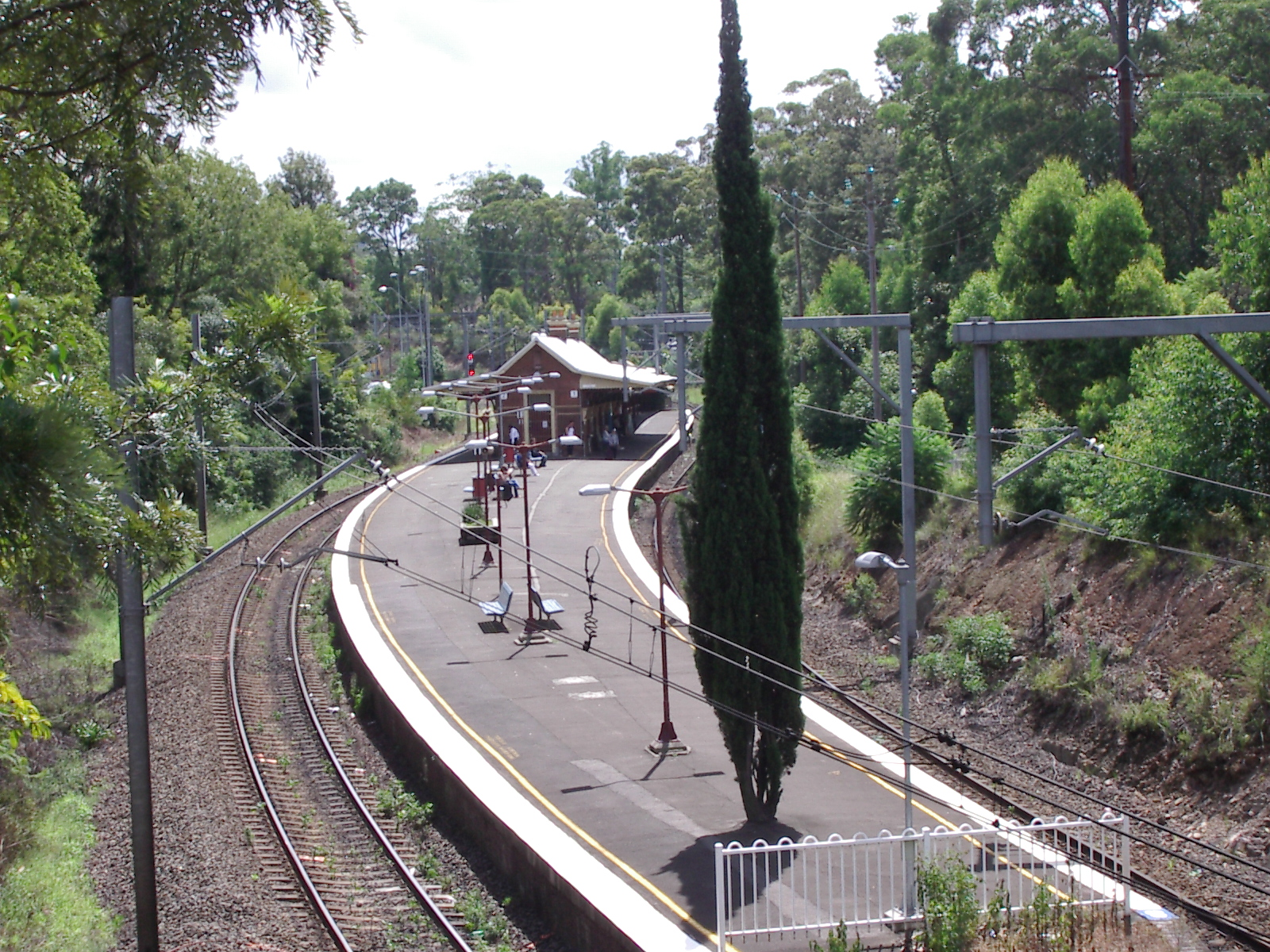
Beecroft railway station

== Landmarks ==
Northern Sydney has many unique landmarks such as: The Sydney Harbour Bridge, Taronga Zoo in Mosman, Admiralty House (Sydney residence of the Governor-General of Australia), Kirribilli House (Sydney residence of the Prime Minister of Australia), Luna Park, Balmoral Beach, Palm Beach, Gladesville Bridge, Macquarie Centre & Ice Skating Rink and Curzon Hall in Marsfield.

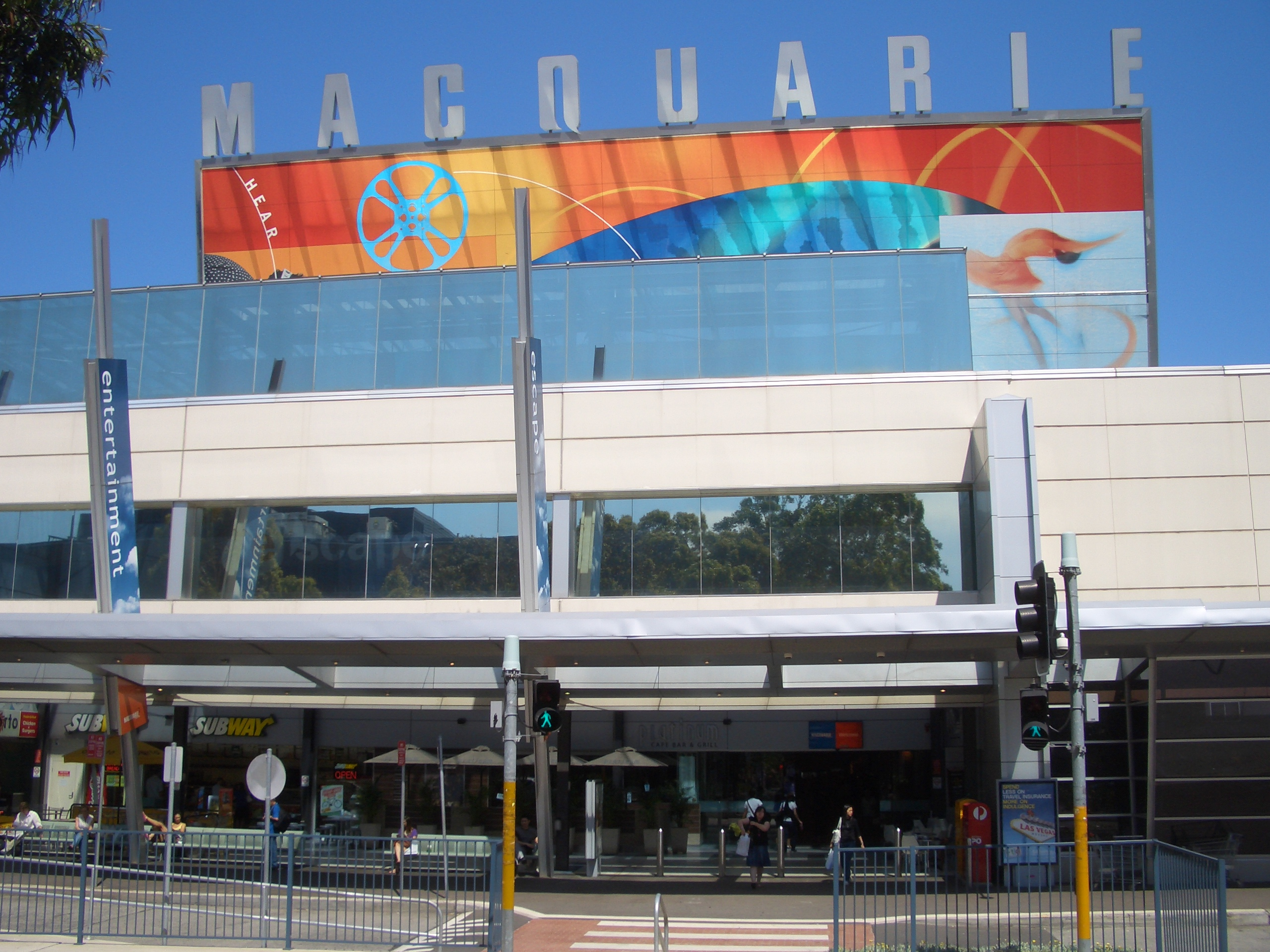
Macquarie Centre's main entrance on Herring Road

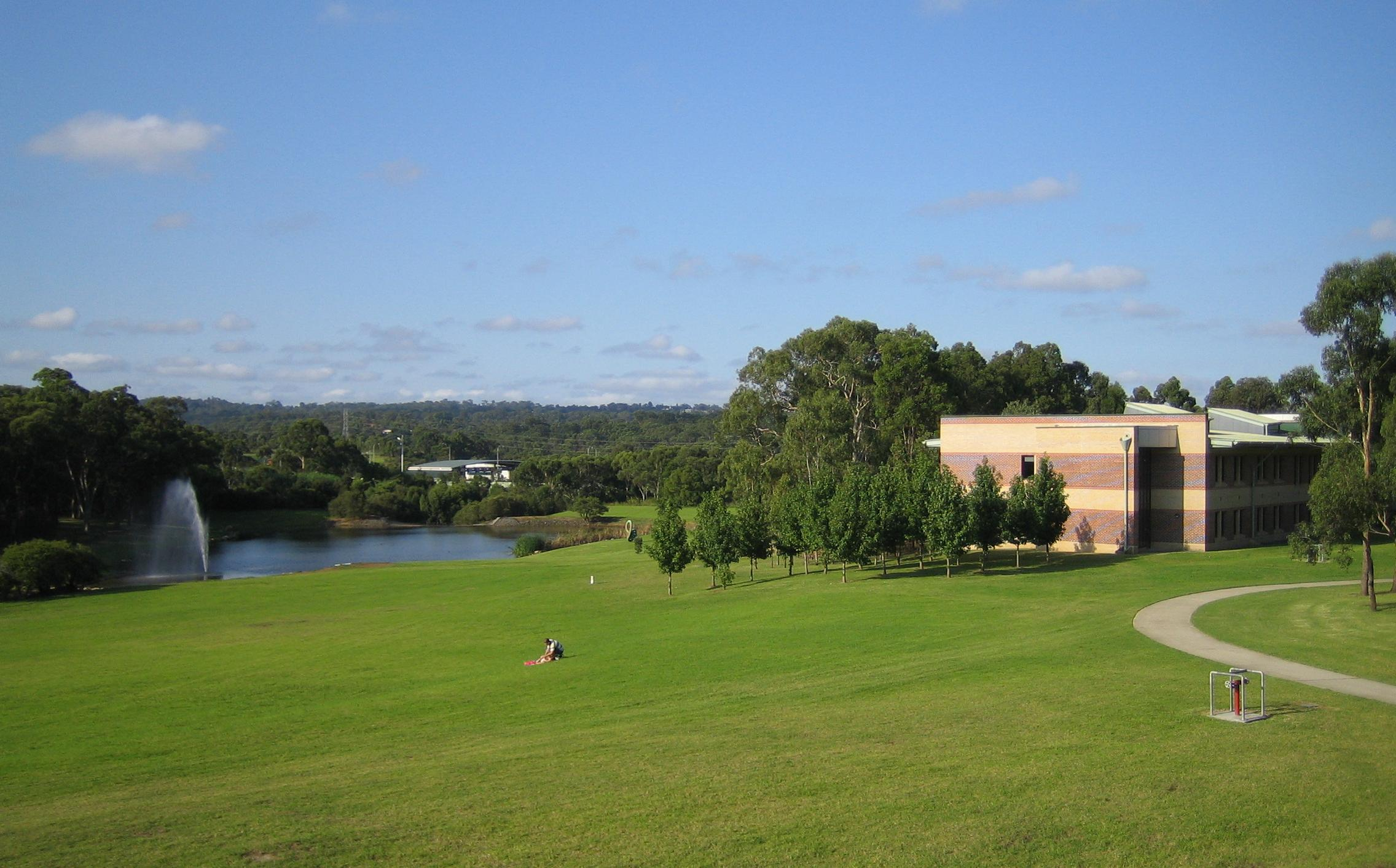
Macquarie University grounds

== Events and celebrations ==
The Willoughby Spring Festival is held throughout the Willoughby local government area, in September each year. The festival lasts for a month and features over 40 events including live music/entertainment, exhibitions, cultural celebrations, business events and many more community activities. The highlight is the annual Willoughby StreetFair where the Chatswood CBD is taken over by market stalls, performers, dancers and musicians. The StreetFair features the Willoughby Street Parade which included over 1,000 participants in 2007.

The suburb of Eastwood holds a large event named the Granny Smith Festival held usually in October of each year. The festival's attendance record set in 2004 currently stands at approximately just over 90,000. Many are attracted each year by the live bands, shows, stores, rides, the main street parade down Rowe Street and of course the massive fireworks display in the skies over Eastwood.

Other main festivals/events in Northern Sydney include: Tartan Day at Lane Cove, the Guringgai Festival honouring Northern Sydney's Aboriginals, The Ryde Aquatic Festival & Bridge to Bridge run, the Moocooboola Festival at Hunters Hill, the Mosman Festival, Lane Cove's Cammeraygal Festival, Chinese New Year at Chatswood and the Ryde Summer Festival which mainly includes outdoor cinemas. Willoughby also holds an annual art prize.
