= Balgowlah Substation =

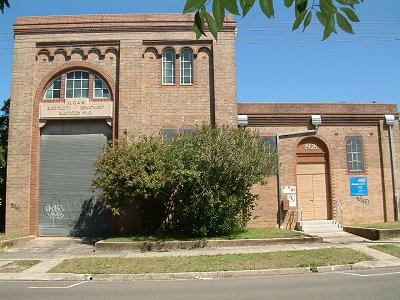

- Location within NE Sydney
- 33°47′34″S 151°16′03″E
- Location: 83 Griffiths Street, Balgowlah, Northern Beaches Council, New South Wales, Australia

History
- Built: 1928

Site notes
- Architectural style: Interwar Stripped Classical
- Owner: Ausgrid

New South Wales Heritage Register
- Official name: Substation; #15003 Balgowlah 33 kV Zone Substation
- Type: State heritage (built)
- Designated: 2 April 1999
- Reference no.: 936
- Type: Electricity Transformer/Substation
- Category: Utilities - Electricity

The Balgowlah Substation is a heritage-listed former electrical substation and now child care centre located at 83 Griffiths Street, Balgowlah, New South Wales, a suburb of Sydney Australia. It was built in 1928. It is also known as #15003 Balgowlah 33 kV Zone Substation. The property is owned by Ausgrid, a privately owned energy utility company. The property was added to the New South Wales State Heritage Register on 2 April 1999.

== History ==
Prior to 1928 the site was in agricultural use.

The Balgowlah Zone substation is a purpose designed and built structure dating from 1928. "M.C. of S.ELECTRICITY DEPARTMENT SUBSTATION no. 191" and "1928" appear above the entrances in relief. It is a similar design to the Pymble and Randwick substations.

In 1926, the Municipal Council of Sydney acquired the subject land for the purpose of constructing a new substation to meet increasing demands for electricity in the Municipality of Manly. Prior to this the land was vacant. Balgowlah Zone Substation was erected on the site in 1928 with the following relief signage above the door "M.C. of S. Electricity Department Substation no. 191, 1928".

Upon its formation in 1951, ownership of the substation was transferred to MacKellar County Council (MCC). Elcom briefly took possession of the substation before MCC reacquired it in 1955. Substantial maintenance works were undertaken in 1976 including replacement of the boundary fence, repairs to the roof, and re-painting.

In 1979, MCC was absorbed into Sydney County Council (SCC), and thus SCC took over Balgowlah Zone Substation. The same year, SCC undertook transformer upgrade works including the installation of additional 11 kiloelectronvolts (1.8 fJ) switchgear and the replacement of transformer cables. SCC would later become Sydney Electricity, which was absorbed into EnergyAustralia in 1996. In 2011 EnergyAustralia's electricity distribution network was rebranded as Ausgrid.

In 1980, following noise complaints, brick screen walls were constructed on the northern and eastern sides of the transformer bays. Although this served to reduce high frequency noise, noise complaints continued. To further reduce reverberation the transformer bays were enclosed by masonry construction and cooling fans installed. Further switchgear and transformer upgrade works were undertaken in 1985.

GEC VLP 33kV bulk oil insulated indoor switchgear

In 2013 the substation was decommissioned. Here the 11kV and 33kV switchgear has been removed and the site offered for sale. Note the blackened area on the left wall, The result of a 2004 11kV switchgear flashover failure.

== Description ==
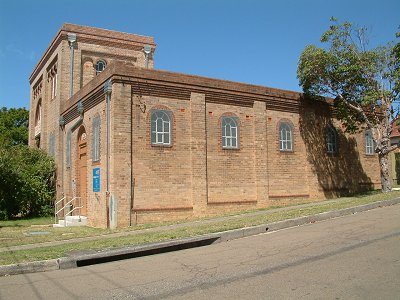
Side view

Development in the surrounding area is primarily low density residential, with single and two storey residences dominating the streetscape. Infill development in the neighbourhood comprises medium density interwar and 1960s apartment blocks and a primary school opposite the site on Griffiths Street.

The Balgowlah Zone substation is an elegant single and two storey structure. It is a refined and well detailed face brick building designed in the Interwar Stripped Classical style evidenced by the vertically emphasised form and facade detailing, parapet cornice and groupings of arched multi-paned windows. Stylistic elements also include recessed facade panels incorporating corbelled brickwork. Decorative elements include contrasting brickwork, repetitive arch motifs and cement rendered lintel plaques within the arches. Two large entrances with roller shutters provide access.

The substation is constructed with load-bearing face brick and incorporates brick arches to all facade openings. Large plant doorways are steel roller shuttered.

The transformer bays and outbuildings sit atop sandstone foundations and a distinctive cut sandstone rock-face is prominent at the rear of the site. Repetitive arch motifs and cement rendered lintel plaques are located within the arches. Two large entrances with roller shutters provide access.

== Heritage listing ==
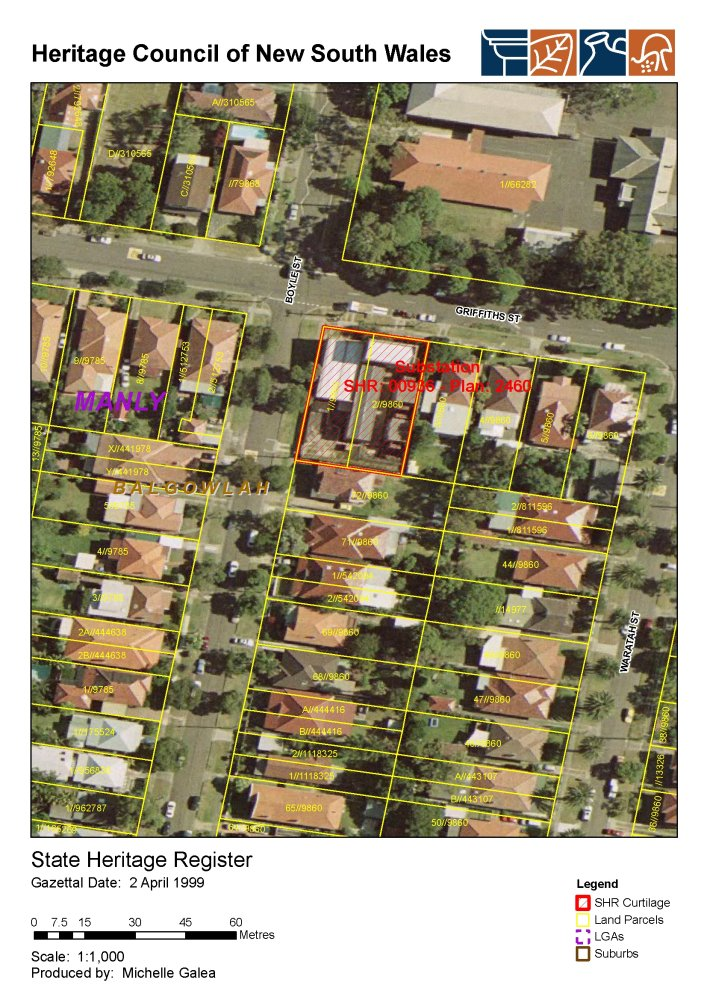
Heritage boundaries

As at 8 November 2000, the Balgowlah Zone substation was an example of a well detailed face brick substation building designed in the interwar period. It is a rare and representative example of this style and considered to be of State Significance.

The substation was listed on the New South Wales State Heritage Register on 2 April 1999.
