= North Balgowlah =

- Suburb
- Interactive map of North Balgowlah
- Country: Australia
- State: New South Wales
- City: Sydney
- LGA: Northern Beaches Council
- Location: 13 km (8.1 mi) north-east of Sydney CBD
- Established: 1832

Government
  - State electorate: Manly
  - Federal division: Warringah
- Elevation: 101 m (331 ft)

Population
  - Total: 3,816 (2021 census)
- Postcode: 2093
Suburbs around North Balgowlah
Allambie Heights	North Manly	Manly Vale
Seaforth	North Balgowlah	Balgowlah
Seaforth	Seaforth	Balgowlah

North Balgowlah is a suburb of Northern Sydney, in the state of New South Wales, Australia. North Balgowlah is located 13 kilometres north-east of the Sydney central business district, in the local government area of Northern Beaches Council, and part of the Northern Beaches region. North Balgowlah shares the postcode 2093 with the adjacent Balgowlah and Balgowlah Heights.

There is access to Manly Dam Memorial Park from many streets in North Balgowlah for bushwalking, kayaking, swimming, and water-skiing. Manly Dam also has a children's playground which is currently being re-developed, and multiple picnic areas

North Balgowlah is home to a primary school, Community Centre, park and local shops.

== History ==
Balgowlah was named in 1832 after an Aboriginal word meaning north harbour in reference to its position from Port Jackson. There are multiple Aboriginal sites in the Manly Dam Memorial Park demonstrating an aboriginal settlement.

In July 1988 a local man fired his gun injuring two people leading to a siege which ended when his body was discovered in his burnt out house on Woodbine Street.
