= Balgowlah Heights Public School =

Primary School in Sydney, New South Wales

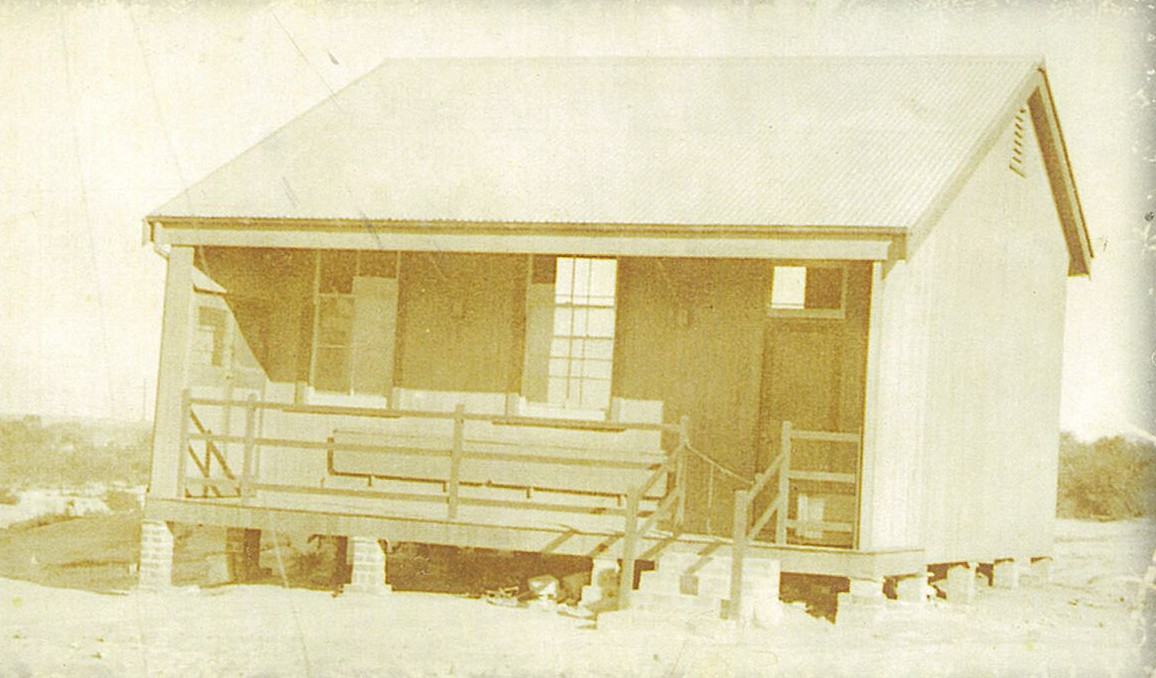
- The original school building

Location
- 9B Lewis St, Balgowlah Heights, New South Wales
- 33.80605°S 151.25801°E

Information
- Former name: Balgowlah Heights Infants School
- Type: Public, co-educational, primary, day school
- Established: 1933
- Educational authority: New South Wales Department of Education
- Oversight: NSW Education Standards Authority
- Principal: David Shuster
- Enrollment: 704 (2023)
- Website: Official Website

Balgowlah Heights Public School (commonly formatted as BHPS) is a public co-educational primary school located in the Sydney suburb of Balgowlah Heights, New South Wales, Australia. It is administered by the New South Wales Department of Education, with an enrollment of 704 students and a teaching staff of 35, as of 2023. The school serves students from Kindergarten to Year 6.

It originally opened as an infants' school in 1933 but lost the classification in 1946, however, remained an Infants' school until the end of 1947 and officially opened as a public school in January 1948. The name of the school was officially recorded as a geographical name by the Department of Lands on 16 July 1976.

== History ==
In 1916, the land was reserved for school purposes, but it wasn't until 1929 that the land was cleared and surveyed. An order to begin construction was issued on 6 July 1932 and the construction was completed on 18 January 1933 at the cost of £384.

At the request of the local population, the school opened at the beginning of the 1933 school year as an infants' school in a portable room. The school population was not large enough to justify a permanent building. It was officially opened by the then member for Mosman, Herbert Lloyd on Saturday, 4 March 1933.

26 students from the school knitted 163 square tiles for a quilt for the Lady Mayoress's Clothing Fund in 1937.

In 1939, the Assistant Federal Treasurer, Percy Spender was disgusted at the conditions of the school during his visit and stated he would bring the matter up with the state premier. In response, the education minister at the time, David Drummond explained that if funds were not diverted to technical education to meet defense requirements, there would be fewer complaints about the condition of state schools. The school population was still not large enough to justify a permanent building at this time.

In 1942, after five weeks volunteers spent digging an air raid shelter for the 31 students, a Works Department inspector deemed it unsatisfactory.

Tenders were being taken by the Education Department in 1948 for the erection of a weathershed and a toilet block, along with the associated sewage installation. In December of the very same year, the headmaster, James Bede announced his retirement, his last day was 7 March 1949.

As part of Education Week in 1954, the pupils planted 100 trees around the school grounds. 70 students, along with their parents took part.

The school went under extensive refurbishment in 2006 to cater for the new student at the time, Sophie Delezio.

In 2015, the premier of New South Wales at the time, Mike Baird visited the school and was popular among the students.

A man attacked a volunteer during a federal election set up outside the school in 2019.

== Demographics ==
In 2023, the school had a student enrollment of 704 with 35 teachers (36.5 full-time equivalent) and 5 non-teaching staff (4.7 full-time equivalent). Female enrollments consisted of 332 students and Male enrollments consisted of 372 students; Indigenous enrollments accounted for a total of 0% and 22% of students had a language background other than English.

== Notable alumni ==
- Sophie Delezio, disability advocate.

== See also ==
- Education in New South Wales
- List of government schools in New South Wales: A–F
