= Tania Park =

Park in Sydney, Australia

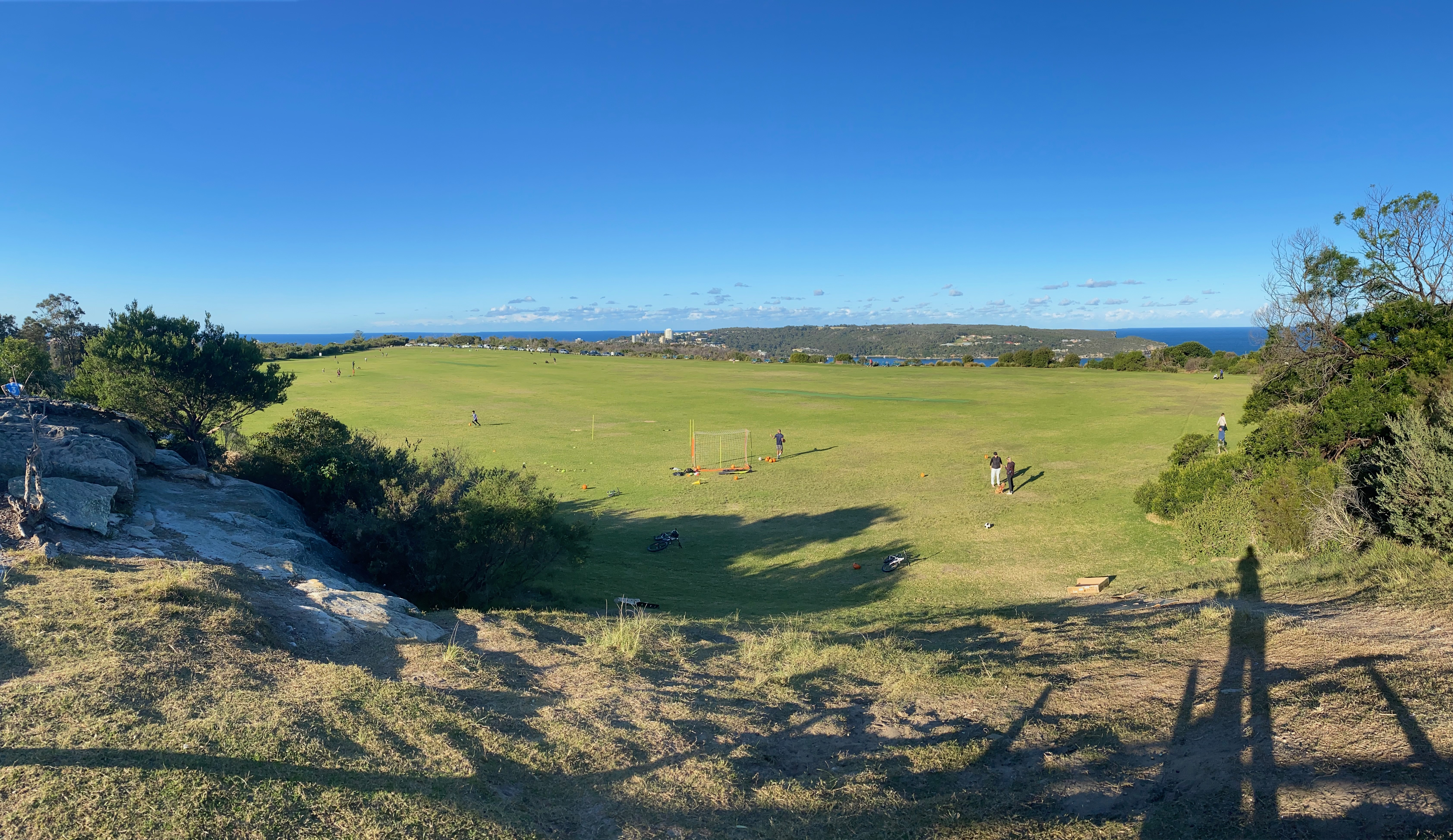
- Interactive map of Tania Park
- Type: Urban park
- Location: 2 Bareena Drive, Balgowlah Heights, New South Wales, Australia
- Coordinates: 33°48′34″S 151°16′00″E
- Created: 1964
- Etymology: Tania Verstak
- Operator: Northern Beaches Council
- Status: Open all year
- Website: www.manly.nsw.gov.au/attractions/sports/sports-fields/tania-park/

Tania Park is an urban park located at 2 Bareena Drive, Balgowlah Heights, a suburb of Sydney, New South Wales, Australia.

Administered by the Northern Beaches Council, the park functions as a suburban park containing large dog exercise areas, sporting facilities and play equipment. The park is adjacent to Dobroyd Head which offers commanding views of Sydney, Middle and North Harbours. Located on a high point, it contains the 90.3 2MWM transmitter, which can be heard across northern and eastern Sydney.

It is named after Tania Verstak, a winner of the 1962 Miss International Beauty pageant, who was brought up locally.

Tania park is known for its wide variety of activities such as dog walking, cricket, football and many more sporting activities.
