= Balgowlah Heights =

- Suburb
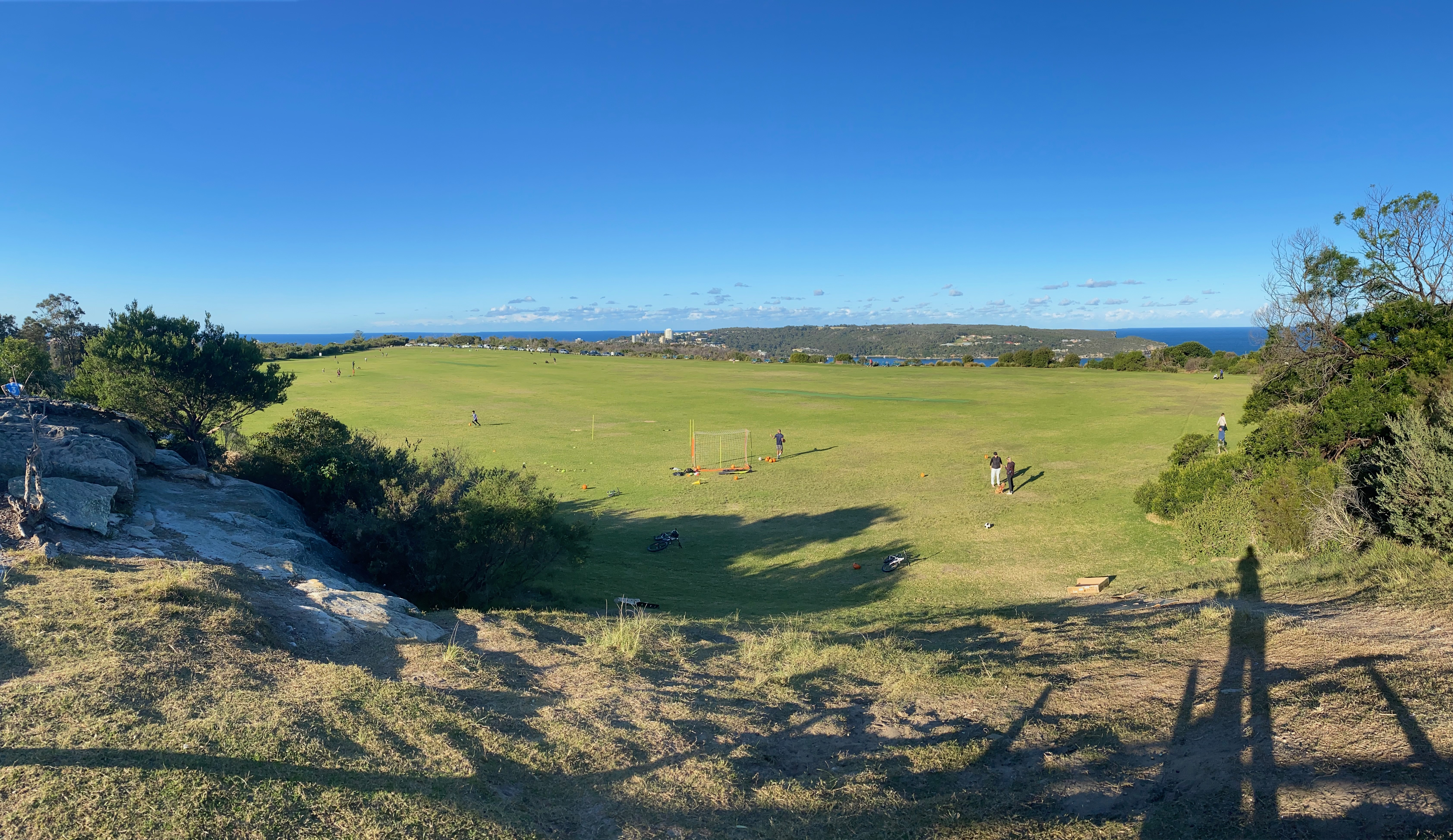
- Tania Park, Balgowlah Heights

- Interactive map of Balgowlah Heights
- Country: Australia
- State: New South Wales
- City: Sydney
- LGA: Northern Beaches Council
- Location: 11 km (6.8 mi) north-east of Sydney CBD
- Established: 1832

Government
  - State electorate: Manly
  - Federal division: Warringah
- Elevation: 76 m (249 ft)

Population
  - Total: 3,546 (2021 census)
- Postcode: 2093
Suburbs around Balgowlah Heights
Balgowlah	Balgowlah	Fairlight
Seaforth	Balgowlah Heights
Clontarf		North Harbour

Balgowlah Heights is a suburb of northern Sydney, in the state of New South Wales, Australia 11 kilometres north-east of the Sydney central business district in the local government area of Northern Beaches Council, in the Northern Beaches region. Balgowlah Heights shares the postcode 2093 with the adjacent Balgowlah and North Balgowlah.

Situated on a ridge up to 80 metres above North Harbour and Middle Harbour, some houses have panoramic views of the harbour, Eastern Suburbs and Spit Bridge. The suburb features remnant Sydney Harbour bushland, contained in the National Park around Dobroyd Head and Grotto Point. Tania Park at the eastern fringe offers relaxed recreation and one can watch the Manly ferry cut its way to Circular Quay.

== History ==
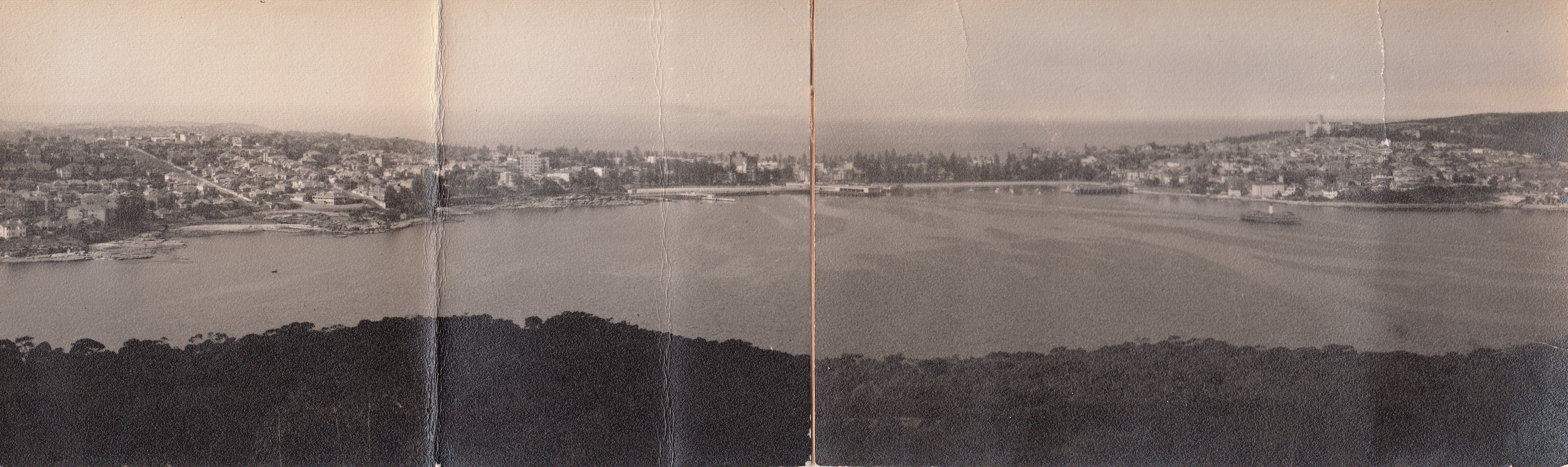
Panorama of Manly from Balgowlah Heights, Sydney (undated)

Balgowlah was named in 1832 after an Aboriginal word meaning north harbour in reference to its position on Port Jackson. The area was not developed until the 1960s.

== Demographics ==
According to the 2021 census, there were 3,546 residents in Balgowlah Heights. 68.1% of people were born in Australia. The next most common country of birth was England at 10.6%. 86.3% of people only spoke English at home. The most common responses for religious affiliation were No Religion 41.4%, Catholic 24.6% and Anglican 20.0%.

== Education ==
- Balgowlah Heights Public School

== Politics ==
Balgowlah Heights is in the federal electorate of Warringah (a seat no longer held by former PM Tony Abbott of the Liberal Party of Australia), the state electorate of Manly (a seat no longer held by Liberal Party MP and Premier Michael Baird) and is within the local council area of Manly. It used to be regarded as a safe Liberal seat, however in the 2019 election the seat was won by Independent, Zali Steggall.
