= Northern District Times =

Australian local newspaper

- Front page example of the Northern District Times
- Type: Weekly Community newspaper
- Format: Tabloid
- Owner(s): Cumberland Newspaper Group (News Limited)
- Editor: Colin Kerr
- Founded: -
- Political alignment: Moderate
- Headquarters: 142–154 Macquarie St, Parramatta, NSW 2150, Australia
- Website: www.northerndistricttimes.com.au

The Northern District Times is an Australian local newspaper, serving the communities in the western parts of the Northern Sydney region. The readership area stretches from the Parramatta River in suburbs such as Gladesville and Hunters Hill to Beecroft and Cheltenham on the Upper North Shore of Sydney. The paper is circulated to approximately 58,500 people, with a readership of approximately 94,000 people. Most of these people are in the 35–64 age group.

The paper is one of the News Limited community newspapers in New South Wales. The Northern District Times is delivered free to homes and businesses every Wednesday.

The paper has been involved in the promotion and sponsorship of local community activities, including the local Granny Smith Festival, held to celebrate the creation of the Granny Smith apple in local suburb Eastwood, and the local section for the Truelocal Business Awards.

== See also ==
- North Shore Times - sister paper for the Upper North Shore area of Sydney.
- List of newspapers in Australia
