= Clontarf, New South Wales =

Clontarf
- Suburb
- Interactive map of Clontarf
- Country: Australia
- State: New South Wales
- City: Sydney
- LGA: Northern Beaches Council
- Location: 13 km (8.1 mi) north-east of Sydney CBD

Government
  - State electorate: Manly
  - Federal division: Warringah

Area
  - Total: 0.8 km^{2} (0.31 sq mi)
- Elevation: 20 m (66 ft)

Population
  - Total: 1,746 (2021 census)
  - Density: 2,180/km^{2} (5,700/sq mi)
- Postcode: 2093
Suburbs around Clontarf
Seaforth	Balgowlah	Seaforth
Seaforth	Clontarf	Balgowlah Heights
Mosman	Mosman	North Harbour

Clontarf (Irish: Cluain Tarbh, meaning "meadow of the bull") is a suburb of northern Sydney, in the state of New South Wales, Australia. Clontarf is located 13 kilometres north-east of the Sydney central business district in the local government area of Northern Beaches Council, in the Northern Beaches region.

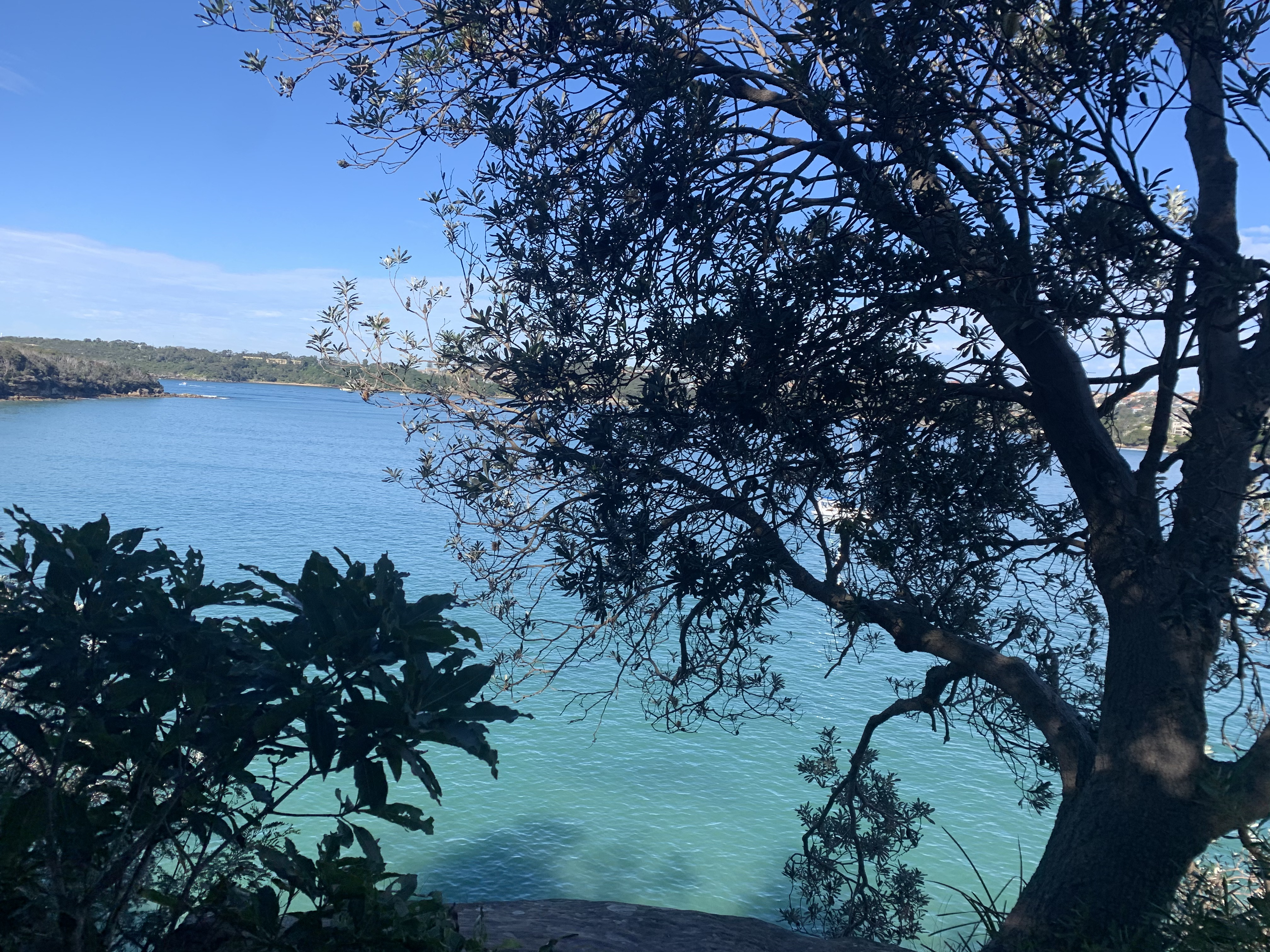

== Landmarks ==
Clontarf's landmarks are Clontarf Beach, Sandy Bay, Castle Rock and Grotto Point.

== History ==
Clontarf is named after the Clontarf district in Dublin, Ireland.

The son of Queen Victoria, Prince Alfred, Duke of Edinburgh, visited Clontarf in 1868 where he was shot in the back by an Irishman, Henry James O'Farrell. Alfred was saved because the bullet struck him at a point where his India-rubber braces, holding his trousers up, crossed over. The bullet was deflected around his rib-cage and did no major harm.

Clontarf beach was washed away by the 1960 Chilean tsunami.

== Name legacy ==
In February 2021 Transport for NSW advised that one of the series 2 Emerald-class ferries to commence service on the Manly ferry service, around the middle of 2021, would be named Clontarf after Clontarf Beach.

== Demographics ==
According to the 2021 census, there were 1,746 residents in Clontarf. 64.1% of people were born in Australia. The next most common countries of birth were England 11.2%, China 3.0%, New Zealand 1.9%, South Africa 1.6% and United States of America 1.4%. 84.1% of people only spoke English at home. Other languages spoken at home included Mandarin 4.0%, Greek 2.1%, Italian 1.1%, French 0.7% and Cantonese 0.7%. The most common responses for religion were No Religion 40.4%, Catholic 20.1% and Anglican 20.1%.

The median age was 47 years, compared to the national median of 38 years, while children aged under 15 years made up 17.5% of the population (national average is 18.2%) and people aged 65 years and over made up 17.6% of the population (national average is 17.3%). The median household income in Clontarf was $4,609 per week, which is nearly triple the national median of $1,746. With high incomes, Clontarf residents also have high housing costs. The median mortgage payment was $5,317 per month compared to $1,863 for all of Australia.
