= Seaforth, New South Wales =

Seaforth
- Suburb
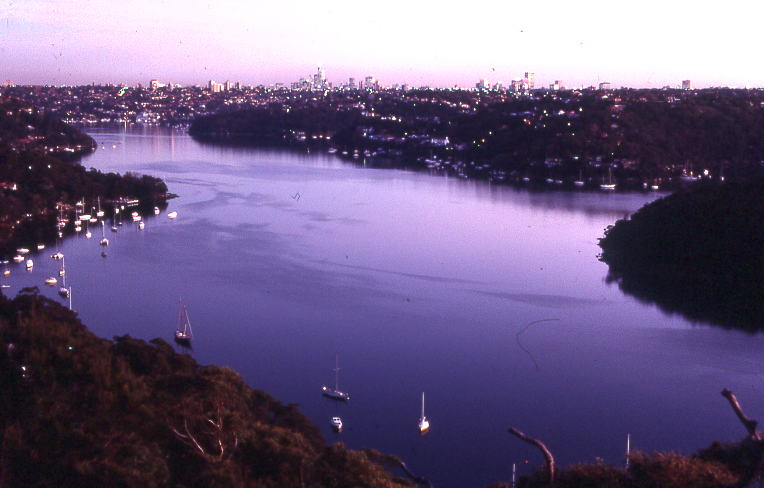
- View of Middle Harbour from Seaforth

- Interactive map of Seaforth
- Country: Australia
- State: New South Wales
- City: Sydney
- LGA: Northern Beaches Council
- Location: 12 km (7.5 mi) north-east of Sydney CBD
- Established: 1906

Government
  - State electorate: Manly
  - Federal division: Warringah

Area
  - Total: 3.1 km^{2} (1.2 sq mi)
- Elevation: 70 m (230 ft)

Population
  - Total: 7,384 (SAL 2021)
- Postcode: 2092
Suburbs around Seaforth
Killarney Heights	Allambie Heights	North Balgowlah
Castlecrag Castle Cove	Seaforth	Balgowlah
Northbridge	Mosman	Clontarf

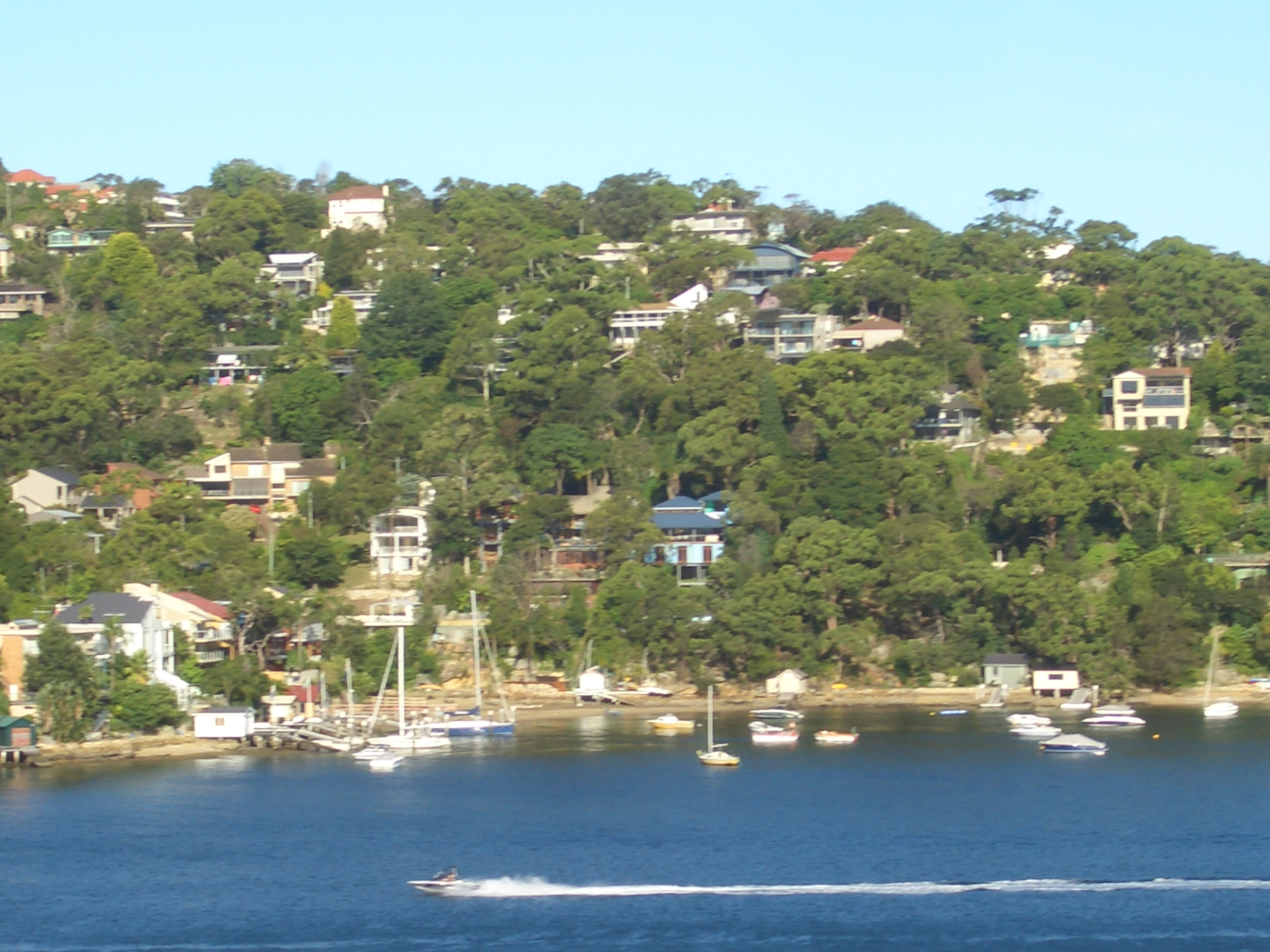
Seaforth

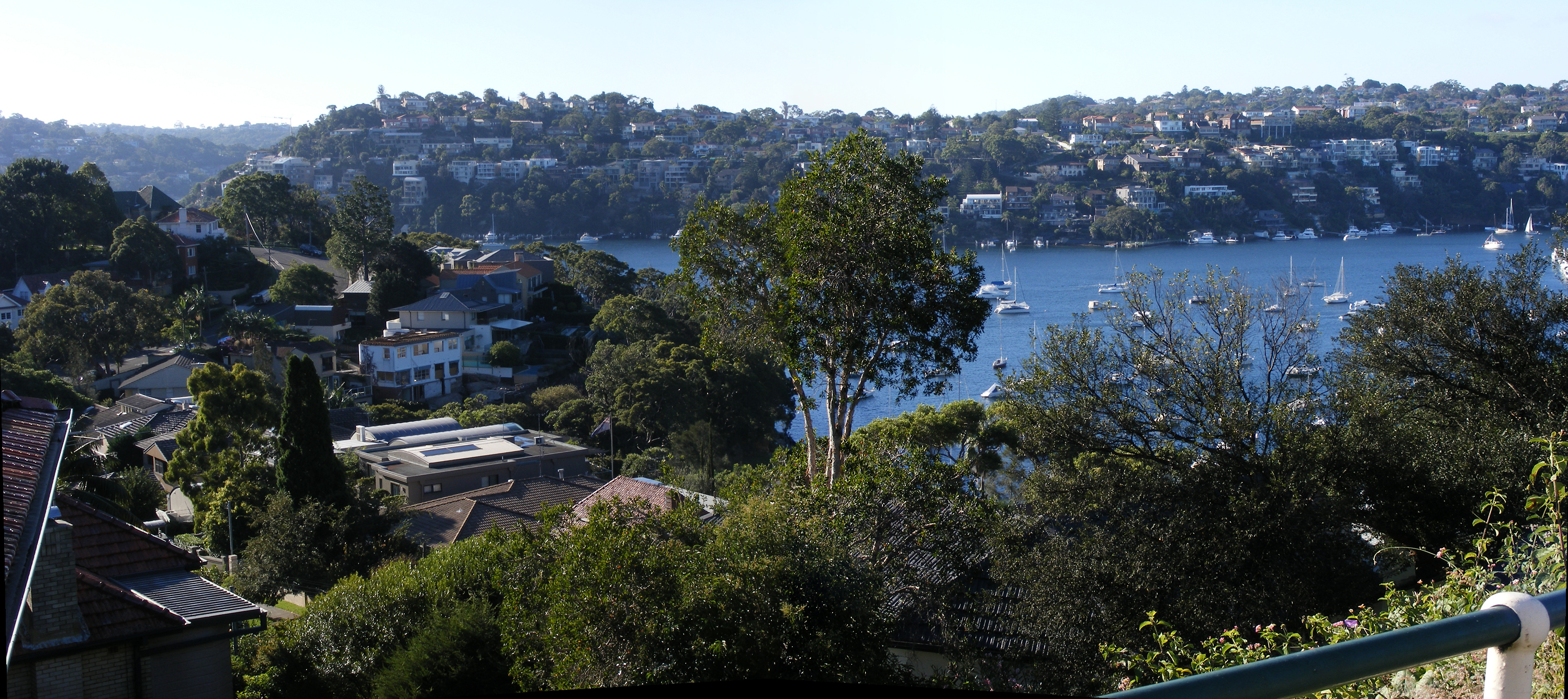
View of Seaforth from Mosman

Seaforth is a suburb of Northern Sydney, in the state of New South Wales, Australia. Seaforth is located 12 kilometres north-east of the Sydney central business district in the local government area of Northern Beaches Council and is part of the Northern Beaches region.

Seaforth overlooks Middle Harbour and is linked south to Mosman by the Spit Bridge. To the west, Seaforth overlooks Sugarloaf Bay across to the suburbs of Northbridge, Castlecrag and Castle Cove. The Garigal National Park sits on the northern border.

== History ==
Seaforth was named after Loch Seaforth and Seaforth Island in Scotland. The land in this area was once owned by Henry Halloran, who subdivided it in 1906.

The Seaforth library was built in 1887 and protected by heritage listing by Manly Council in 1995. It stands outside the former Seaforth TAFE. Seaforth celebrated its centenary on Sunday 12 November 2006 with a historical display in the town centre.

== Commercial area ==
The Seaforth shopping district is located off Sydney Road and offers a wide variety of services, including niche market products. It is also home to Balgowlah RSL Memorial Club.

== Demographics ==
At the 2021 census, the suburb of Seaforth recorded a population of 7,384. Of these:

- There are more families with young children than typical. While the median age was 42 years, compared to the national median of 38 years, children aged under 15 years made up 23.1% of the population (the national average was 18.2%) and people aged 65 years and over made up 15.3% of the population (the national average was 17.2%).
- 64.9% of people were born in Australia. The most common countries of birth were England 9.5%, China (excluding Special Administrative Regions and Taiwan) 2.5%, New Zealand 2.2%, South Africa 1.7% and the United States of America 1.5%.
- 81.9% of people only spoke English at home. Other languages spoken at home included Mandarin at 2.9%, Cantonese at 1.2%, Spanish at 1.2%, Greek at 1.1% and German at 1.0%.
- The most common responses for religion were No Religion at 41.7%, Catholic at 24.8%, Anglican at 16.3% and Eastern Orthodox at 2.7%.
- The median household weekly income was $4,184, compared to the national median of $1,746.
- Separate houses made up the vast majority (86.6%) of residences, 8.0% were semi-detached and 5.1% were flats, units or apartments. The average household size was 3.1 people.

== Schools ==
Seaforth is home to Seaforth Public School. There is currently an aged care facility where a TAFE used to be.
