= Fairlight, New South Wales =

Fairlight
- Suburb
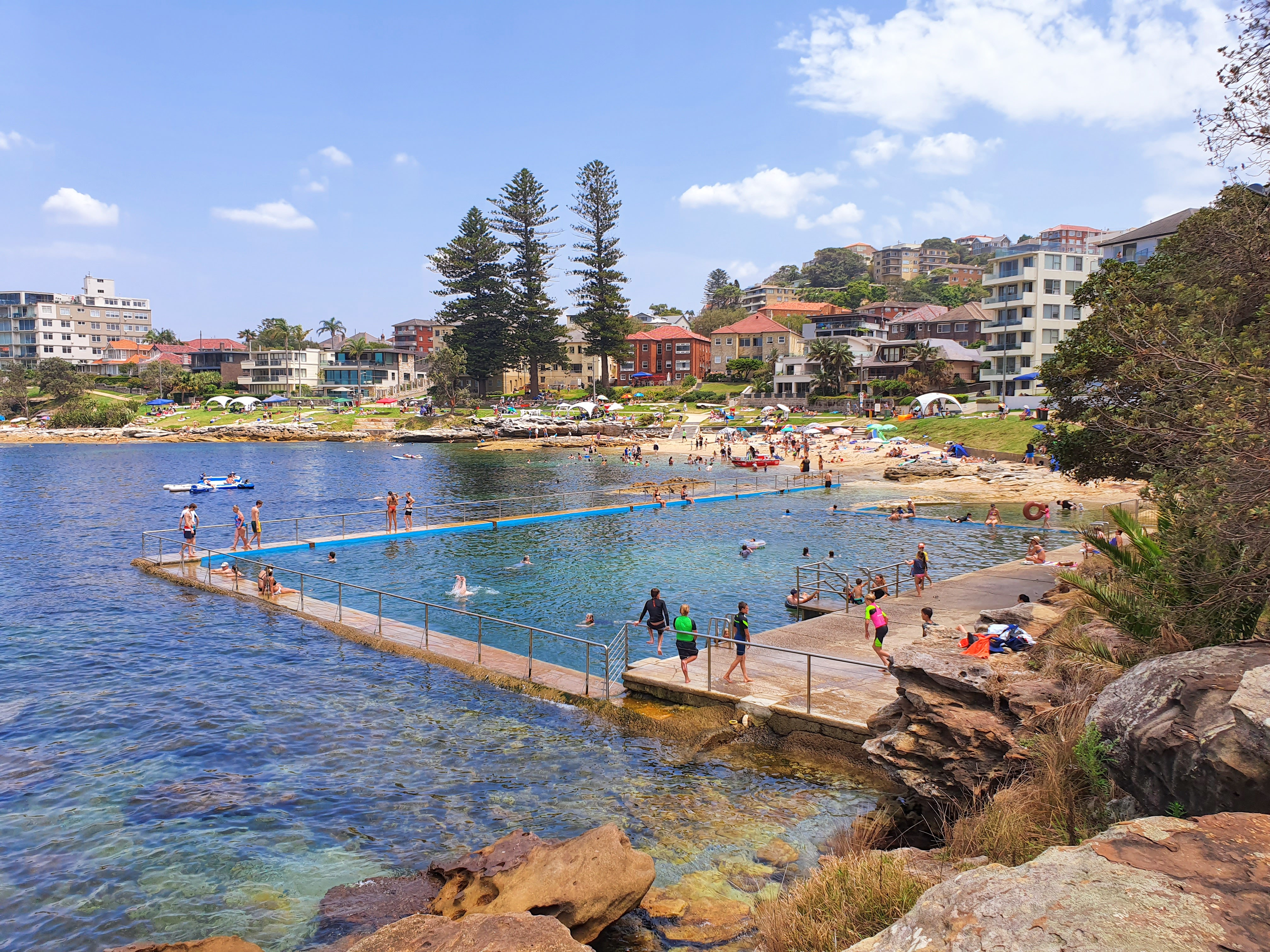
- Fairlight Rock Pool

- Interactive map of Fairlight
- Country: Australia
- State: New South Wales
- City: Sydney
- LGA: Northern Beaches Council
- Location: 13 km (8.1 mi) north-east of Sydney CBD

Government
  - State electorate: Manly
  - Federal division: Warringah
- Elevation: 55 m (180 ft)

Population
  - Total: 6,146 (2021 census)
- Postcode: 2094
Suburbs around Fairlight
Manly Vale	Manly Vale	Queenscliff
Balgowlah	Fairlight	Manly
Balgowlah Heights	North Harbour	Manly

Fairlight is a suburb of northern Sydney, in the state of New South Wales, Australia. Fairlight is located 13 kilometres (8.1 miles) north-east of the Sydney central business district in the local government area of Northern Beaches Council and is part of the Northern Beaches region.

Fairlight lies between Balgowlah and Manly on both sides of Sydney Road. The suburb reaches north past Balgowlah Road and the western boundary is Hill Street.

== History ==
Fairlight takes its name from Fairlight House built by Henry Gilbert Smith (1802–1886) on land he bought in 1853 from John Parker who had received a land grant in 1837. The house was named after Fairlight, East Sussex, a historic village near Hastings, on the south coast of England.

Fairlight was originally only the area near the beach where Fairlight House once stood, and the suburb at the top of the hill was called Red Hill, due to the pre World War II red gravel surface of Sydney Road.

== Name legacy ==
The Port Jackson & Manly Steamship Company had a tradition of naming its ferries after the suburbs of the Northern Beaches. A paddle steamer ferry was commissioned in 1878 and named "Fairlight". In 1966, the company commissioned a hydrofoil Fairlight, which in turn gave its name to the Fairlight CMI synthesiser. In 1987 Strider and Black Shadow named the now legendary warez and demogroup Fairlight after this synthesizer company.

In February 2021 Transport for NSW advised that one of the series 2 Emerald-class ferries to commence service on the Manly ferry service around the middle of 2021, would be named Fairlight after Fairlight Beach.

== Landmarks ==
Fairlight has a cemetery in Griffiths Street. The Manly Fire Station is located on Sydney Road, Fairlight.

=== Fairlight Beach ===
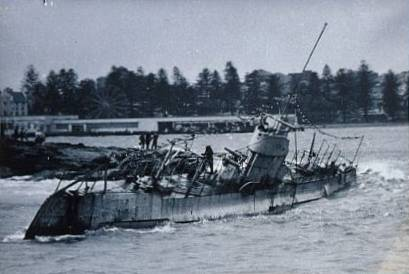
Dutch submarine K-12 on Fairlight Beach in 1949

Fairlight Beach is located on the Manly Scenic Walkway on Sydney Harbour, which can be followed for some kilometres (miles) to Spit Bridge. The beach experiences light harbour swells and southerly winds. Though swells up to 2 metres (6.6 ft) were recorded following Hurricane Larry, it is not a surfing beach, as the shore is rocky and the break unpredictable. The beach has sand largely made up of shell grit (largely missing from the beaches on either side), and a small tidal swimming pool.

The K-12 was a 611-ton ex-submarine of the Royal Netherlands Navy (later the United States Navy) that was bought by private buyers after World War II and leased to the Port Jackson & Manly Steamship Company, who set her up as a museum ship at a custom berth adjacent to Manly harbour pool. When storms struck in June 1949, an attempt was made by her owners to tow her to a safer berth in Neutral Bay, however the tow ropes broke, and the submarine grounded on rocks near Fairlight Beach. The hull was lightened by salvagers then re-floated on 7 January 1951, and towed up the Parramatta River to Ryde Road bridge; however here she sank again after her seacocks were vandalised. Some sources say that the engines and sections of the bow remain in Fairlight and are accessible by scuba divers. However, they are the remains of a large aluminium speedboat that got blown by high winds and sunk on the night of 7 January 1952.

== Population ==
In the 2021 Census, there were 6,146 people in Fairlight. 63.9% of people were born in Australia. The next most common countries of birth were England 11.5% and New Zealand 2.3%. 86.1% of people only spoke English at home. The most common responses for religion were No Religion 51.0%, Catholic 19.9% and Anglican 14.4%. The most common occupations included Professionals 39.9%, Managers 24.3%, Clerical and Administrative Workers 10.2%, Community and Personal Service Workers 7.7%, and Sales Workers 6.5%. The median household weekly income was high at $3,251. Housing was expensive in Fairlight, with the median weekly rent being $720 and the median monthly mortgage payment was $3,467.

== Sport and recreation ==
Fairlight Beach is popular for swimming and snorkelling and as a vantage point to view harbour yacht races. Fairlight is home to the Manly Golf Club and Golf Course. Shops and cafes are located in a shopping strip in Sydney Road.

== Events ==
Fairlight is home to an annual Christmas Lights fundraising competition on Edwin Street.
