= Balgowlah =

- Suburb
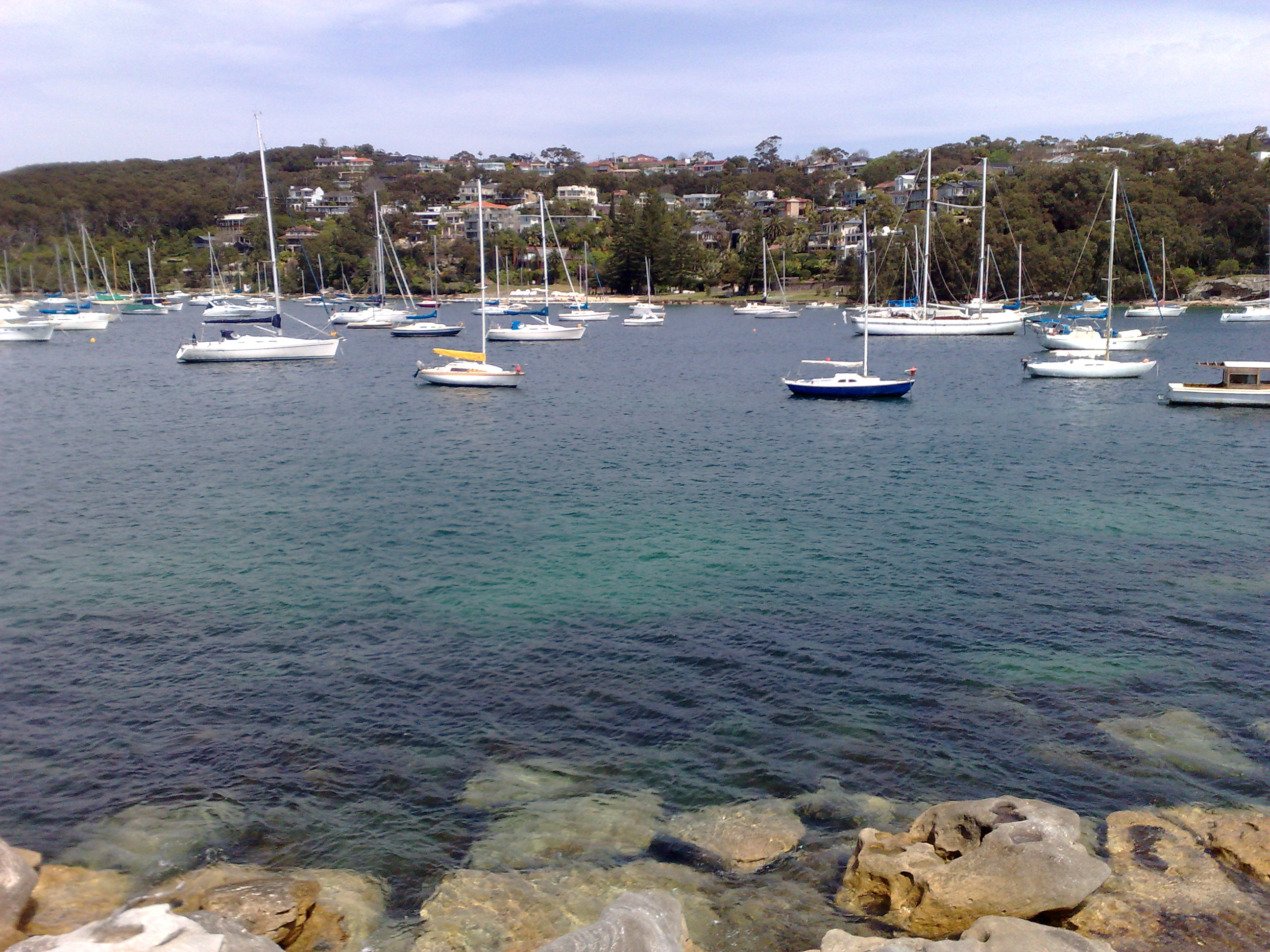
- North Harbour, Balgowlah

- Interactive map of Balgowlah
- Country: Australia
- State: New South Wales
- City: Sydney
- LGA: Northern Beaches Council
- Location: 12 km (7.5 mi) north-east of Sydney CBD
- Established: 1832; 194 years ago

Government
  - State electorate: Manly
  - Federal division: Warringah
- Elevation: 43 m (141 ft)

Population
  - Total: 8,068 (2021 census)
- Postcode: 2093
Suburbs around Balgowlah
North Balgowlah	Manly Vale	Manly Vale
Seaforth	Balgowlah	Fairlight
Clontarf	Balgowlah Heights	North Harbour

Balgowlah is a suburb of northern Sydney, in the state of New South Wales, Australia. Balgowlah (or Bulgowlah) said to be an Aboriginal name for "North Harbour". The area now known as Balgowlah was known to the Aboriginals as Jilling.

Balgowlah is located 12 kilometres north-east of the Sydney central business district in the local government area of Northern Beaches Council, in the Northern Beaches region. Balgowlah shares the postcode 2093 with the adjacent suburbs of Manly Vale, Balgowlah Heights and North Balgowlah.

== History ==
Balgowlah was named in 1832 after an Aboriginal word meaning north harbour in reference to its position from Port Jackson. In the early days of European Settlement it had been known as Little Manly. Sir Edmund Barton, Australia's first prime minister, resided in the building known as Whitehall in White Street. Since 2004, Whitehall has been the site of the Norwegian Seamen's Church.

== Heritage listings ==
Balgowlah has a number of heritage-listed sites, including:

- 83 Griffiths Street: Balgowlah Substation

== Demographics ==
According to the 2021 census of population, there were 8,068 residents in Balgowlah. 65.2% of residents were born in Australia. The most common other countries of birth were England 9.6%, New Zealand 2.7% and South Africa 1.9%. 83.3% of residents spoke only English at home. The most common responses for religious affiliation were No Religion 47.1%, Catholic 23.0% and Anglican 14.3%.

== Commercial area ==
Balgowlah's main commercial area is located on Condamine Street and Sydney Road. Major businesses in Balgowlah are Harvey Norman and Bunnings. Stockland Balgowlah is a shopping centre located on Condamine Street. The centre opened on 15 July 2009. Its main majors are Coles, Fitness First and 62 other retailers. Stockland Balgowlah is built on the site of the historic Totem Centre, which opened in 1959. The name Totem was based on the North American model. The centre had 33 shops, a Zone Bowling bowling alley and a huge Woolworths store. In 2007 the Totem Centre was demolished, the centre was run down at the time of its demolition and the Totem name was not continued. However, the centre is still colloquially referred to as "the Totem" or the "Totem Shopping Centre" in the area. The nearest major shopping centre is Westfield Warringah Mall, located two kilometres north of the suburb.

There are a few smaller shopping areas in Balgowlah, some of them the remnants of the traditional "corner shop" prior to the 1960s.

== Transport ==
Balgowlah is one of the destinations for the Hop-Skip-Jump free bus service operated by Northern Beaches Council. Numerous public buses operated by Keolis Northern Beaches also operate in the area, the majority coming through Balgowlah en route to Manly, Westfield Warringah Mall, Seaforth and the city.

== Schools ==
Schools in the Balgowlah region include:

- St. Cecilias Primary School
- Balgowlah Heights Public School
- Manly West Public School
- Northern Beaches Secondary College Balgowlah Boys Campus

== Parks and reserves ==
The North Harbour Reserve on Condamine Street, south of the shopping centre, is a popular picnic spot for large groups. The reserve is also on the scenic walk that runs from Manly through Fairlight, Balgowlah, Balgowlah Heights and Clontarf to The Spit, near the Spit Bridge.

== Notable people ==
- Moya Beaver - ballet dancer
- Wayne Jarratt – actor on stage and television
- Emma Jeffcoat – Australian triathlete
- Callan Mulvey – actor on television and film
- Jack Vidgen – singer
