= List of city and town halls =

This is a list of city and town halls. Buildings used as the seat of local government are in this context classed as city or town halls.

== Argentina ==
- Buenos Aires City Hall
- La Plata City Hall
- Palacio de los Leones

== Armenia ==
- Yerevan City Hall

== Australia ==
=== New South Wales ===
- Alexandria
- Annandale
- Balmain
- Botany
- Darlington
- Erskineville
- Glebe
- Granville
- Hornsby
- Hunters Hill
- Leichhardt
- Manly
- Marrickville
- Newtown
- North Sydney
- Paddington
- Parramatta
- Petersham
- Randwick
- Redfern
- Rockdale
- Ryde
- Sydney
- Warringah
- Waterloo
- Willoughby
- Woollahra

=== Queensland ===
- Brisbane City Hall
- Toowoomba City Hall

=== South Australia ===
- Adelaide Town Hall

=== Tasmania ===
- Hobart Town Hall

=== Victoria ===
- Melbourne Town Hall

=== Western Australia ===
- Perth Town Hall
- Fremantle Town Hall

== Austria ==
- Rathaus, Vienna

== Bangladesh ==
For cities in Bangladesh see

- City Hall, Barishal
- City Hall, Bogura
- City Hall, Chattogram
- City Hall, Cumilla
- City Hall, Dhaka
- City Hall, Gazipur
- City Hall, Jashore
- City Hall, Khulna
- City Hall, Mymensigh
- City Hall, Narayanganj
- City Hall, Rajshahi
- City Hall, Rangpur
- City Hall, Sylhet
- Dinajpur Town Hall
- Kushtia Town Hall
- Pabna Town Hall
- Rangamati Town Hall
- Noakhali Town Hall
- Satkhira Town Hall
- Feni Town Hall
- Tangail Town Hall
- Bagerhat Town Hall
- Faridpur Town Hall
- Patuakhali Town Hall
- Magura Town Hall
- Narail Town Hall
- Jhenaidah Town Hall
- Meherpur Town Hall
- Chuadanga Town Hall

== Belgium ==
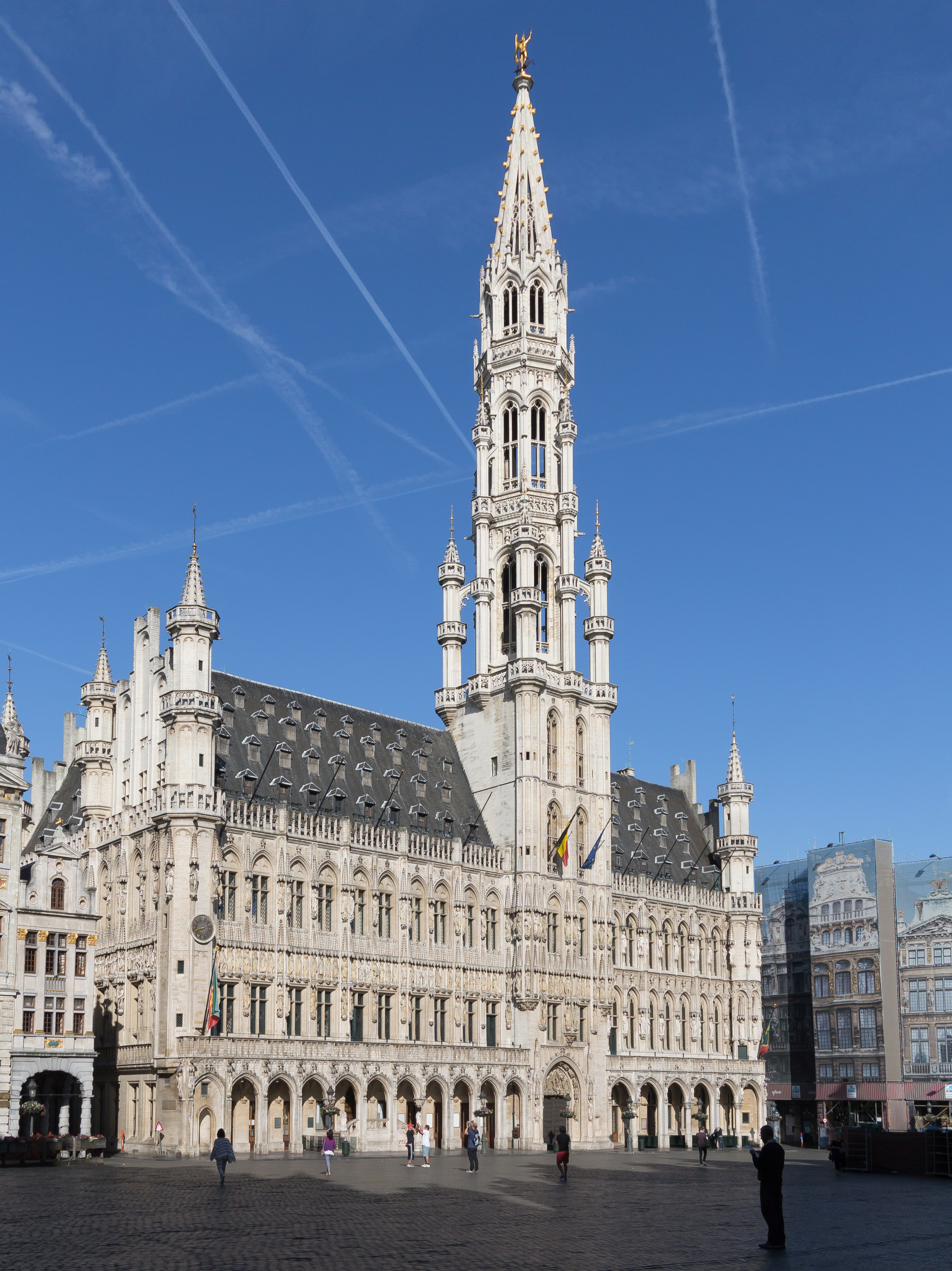
Brussels Town Hall

- Schepenhuis, Aalst
- Antwerp City Hall
- Brussels Town Hall
- Kortrijk City Hall
- Leuven Town Hall
- Old Town Hall, Lo
- Oudenaarde Town Hall

== Bosnia and Herzegovina ==
- Sarajevo City Hall (Vijećnica)

== Brazil ==
- Matarazzo Building

== Croatia ==
- Old City Hall (Zagreb)
- Pula Communal Palace
- Rector's Palace, Dubrovnik

== Czech Republic ==
- Liberec City Hall
- New Town Hall (Prague)
- New City Hall, Ostrava

== Denmark ==
- Aarhus City Hall
- Copenhagen City Hall
- Frederiksberg Town Hall

== Estonia ==
- Narva Town Hall
- Tallinn Town Hall
- Tartu Town Hall

== Finland ==
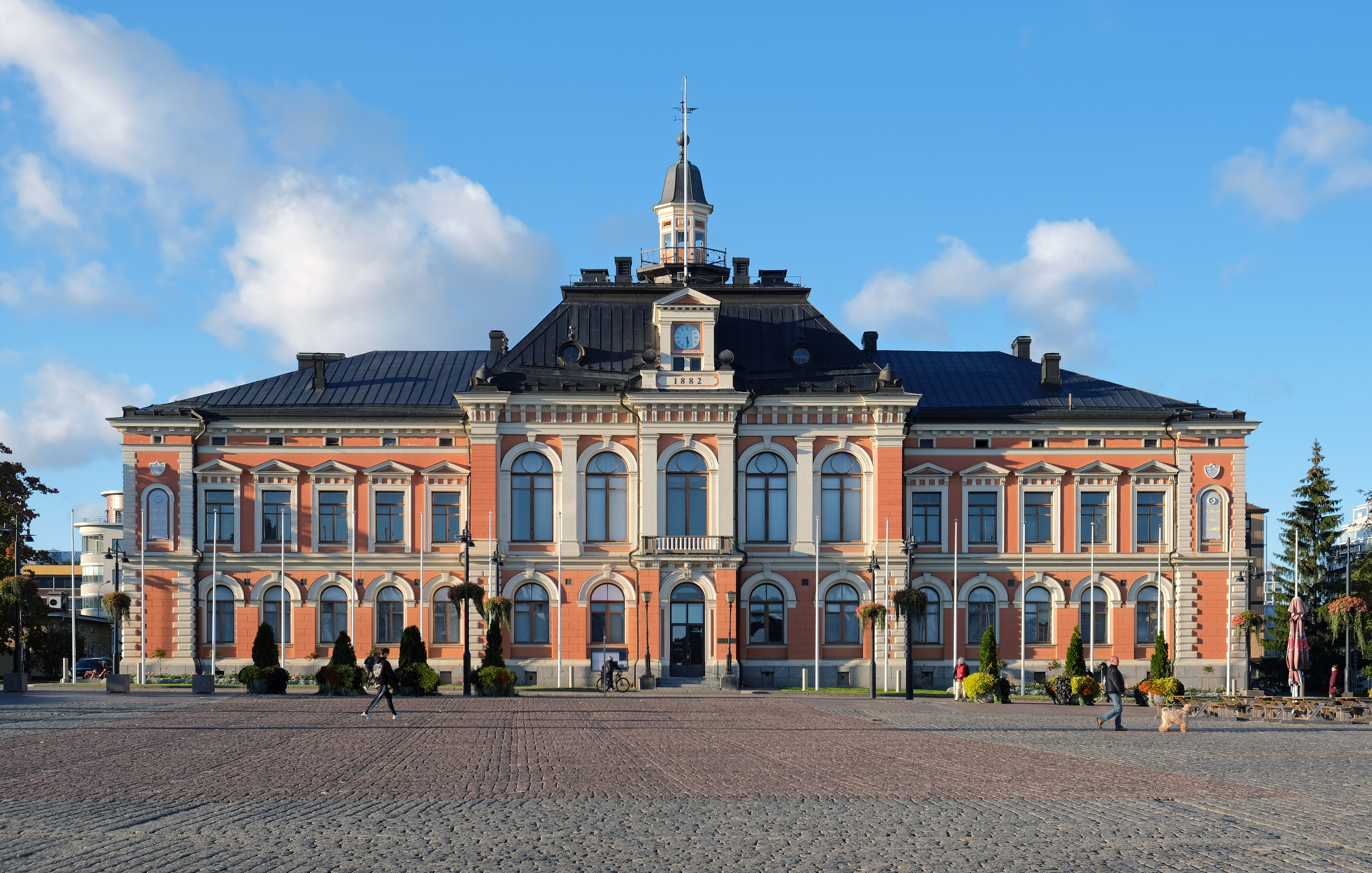
Kuopio City Hall

- Helsinki City Hall
- Jakobstad City Hall
- Kuopio City Hall
- Lahti Town Hall
- Oulu City Hall
- Pori Old Town Hall
- Rauma Old Town Hall
- Säynätsalo Town Hall
- Turku City Hall

== Germany ==
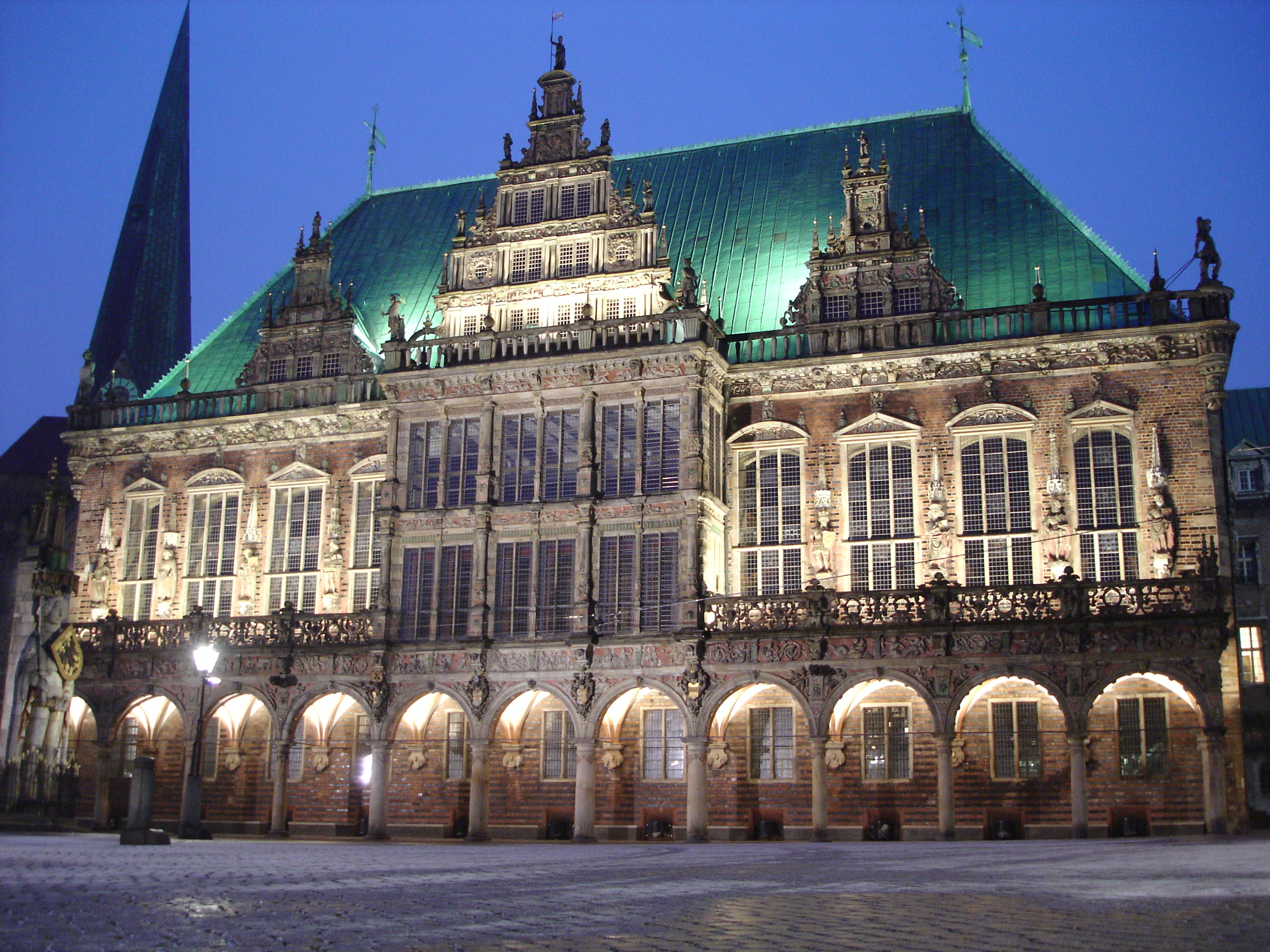
Bremen City Hall

- Augsburg Town Hall
- Berlin City Hall
- Bonn City Hall
- Bremen City Hall
- Cologne City Hall
- Dortmund City Hall
- Düsseldorf City Hall
- Duisburg City Hall
- Essen City Hall
- Frankfurt City Hall
- Old Town Hall (Halle, Germany)
- Hamburg Rathaus
- New Town Hall (Hanover)
- Kaiserslautern Town Hall
- New Town Hall, Munich
- Historical City Hall of Münster
- Recklinghausen City Hall
- Rathaus Schöneberg
- Rotes Rathaus
- Römer
- Schmargendorf Town Hall

== Georgia ==
- Tbilisi City Hall

== Hong Kong ==
- Hong Kong City Hall
- North District Town Hall
- Sha Tin Town Hall
- Tsuen Wan Town Hall
- Tuen Mun Town Hall
- Yuen Long Town Hall

== Hungary ==
- Kecskemét City Hall

== India ==
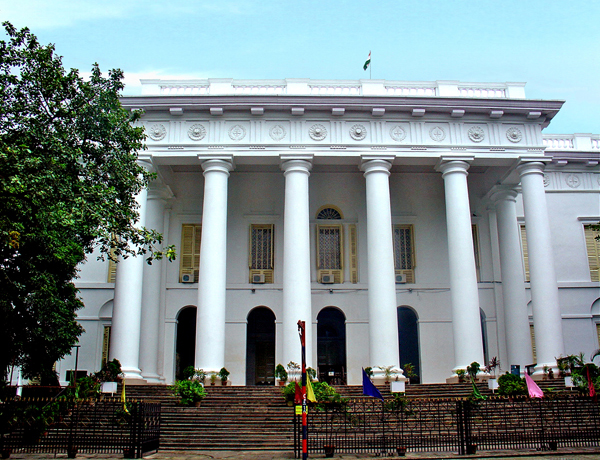
Kolkata Town Hall

- Delhi Town Hall
- Shimla Town Hall
- Kanpur Town Hall
- Kolkata Town Hall
- King George Hall
- King Edward Memorial Hall
- Mumbai Town Hall

== Indonesia ==
- Cirebon City Hall
- Jakarta City Hall
- Medan City Hall
- Surabaya City Hall

== Italy ==
- Ca' Farsetti and Ca' Loredan, Venice City Hall
- Palazzo Senatorio
- Palazzo della Ragione, Padua
- Palazzo Pubblico
- Palazzo Vecchio
- Palazzo dell'Arengo

== Iceland ==
- Reykjavík City Hall
- Hafnarfjörður Town Hall

== Lithuania ==
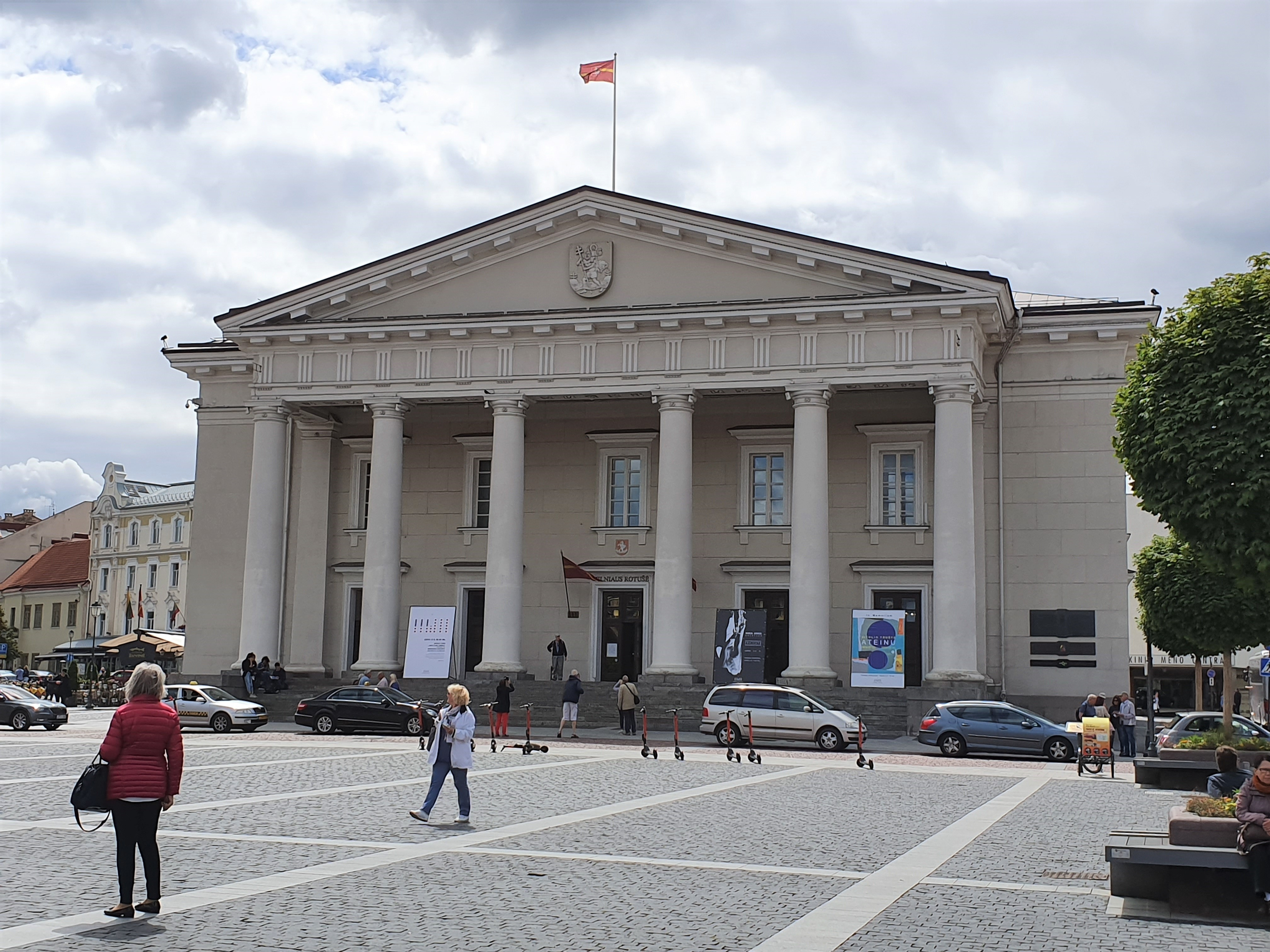
Vilniaus City Hall

- Town Hall, Kaunas
- Town Hall, Vilnius
- Town Hall, Kėdainiai

== Luxembourg ==
- Luxembourg City Hall
- Mamer Castle

== Malta ==
- Auberge de France in Birgu
- Banca Giuratale in Victoria, Gozo
- Corte Capitanale in Mdina
- Della Grazie Battery in Xgħajra

== Netherlands ==
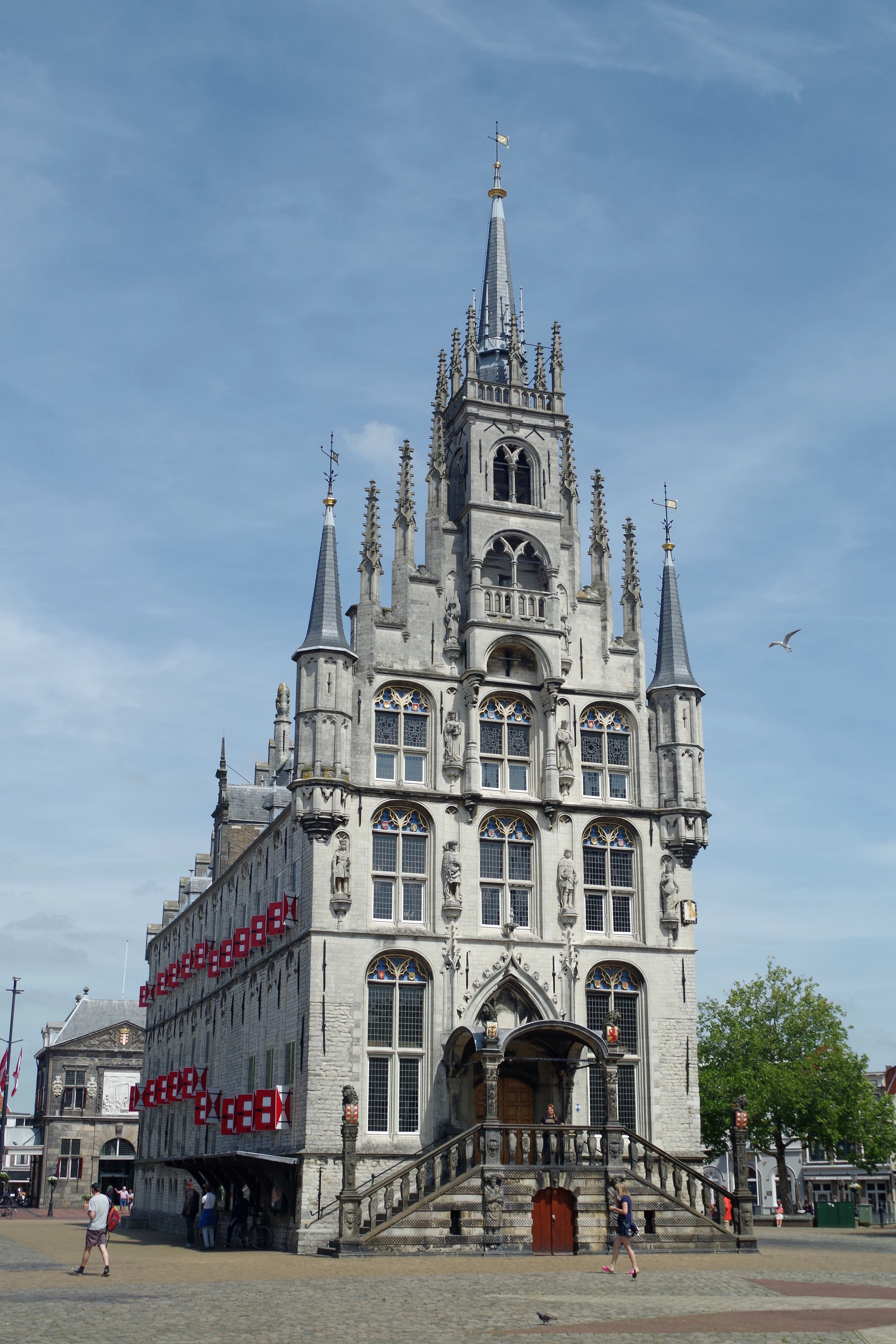
City hall Gouda

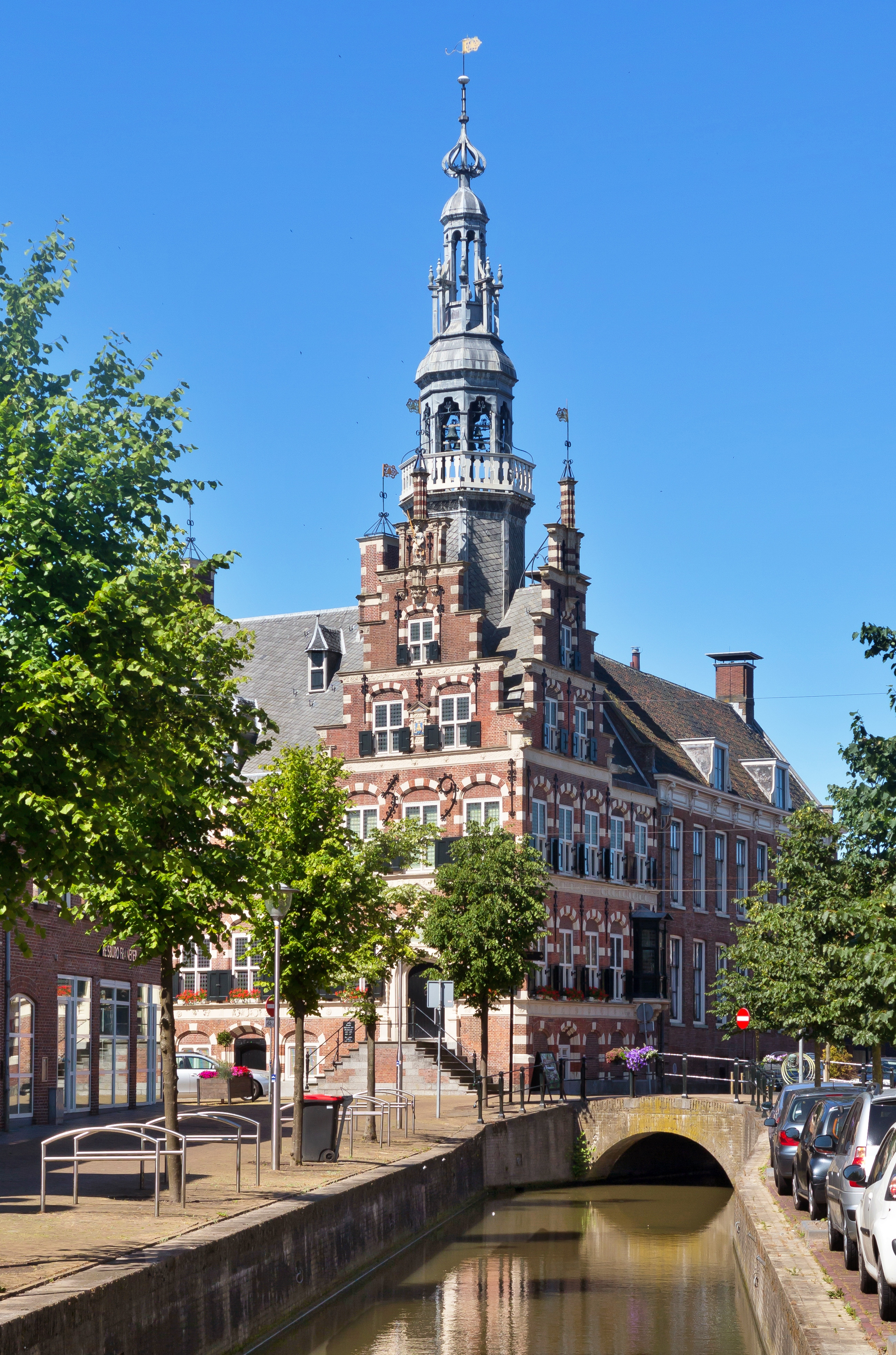
Franeker City Hall

- City Hall (Haarlem)
- Royal Palace of Amsterdam (former town hall)
- City Hall (Delft)
- Maastricht City Hall
- Middelburg Town Hall
- Old City Hall (The Hague)
- Rotterdam City Hall
- Former town hall of Nieuwer-Amstel
- City Hall, Groningen
- City Hall, Dordrecht
- City Hall, Kampen
- Hilversum Town Hall
- City Hall, Weesp
- Gemeenlandshuis
- Gemeenlandshuis van Rijnland
- Gemeenlandshuis Zwanenburg
- Franeker City Hall
- City Hall of Tilburg
- Crackstate
- Stopera
- De Rijp Town Hall

== New Zealand ==
- Auckland Town Hall
- Christchurch Town Hall
- Dunedin Town Hall
- Wellington Town Hall

== Norway ==
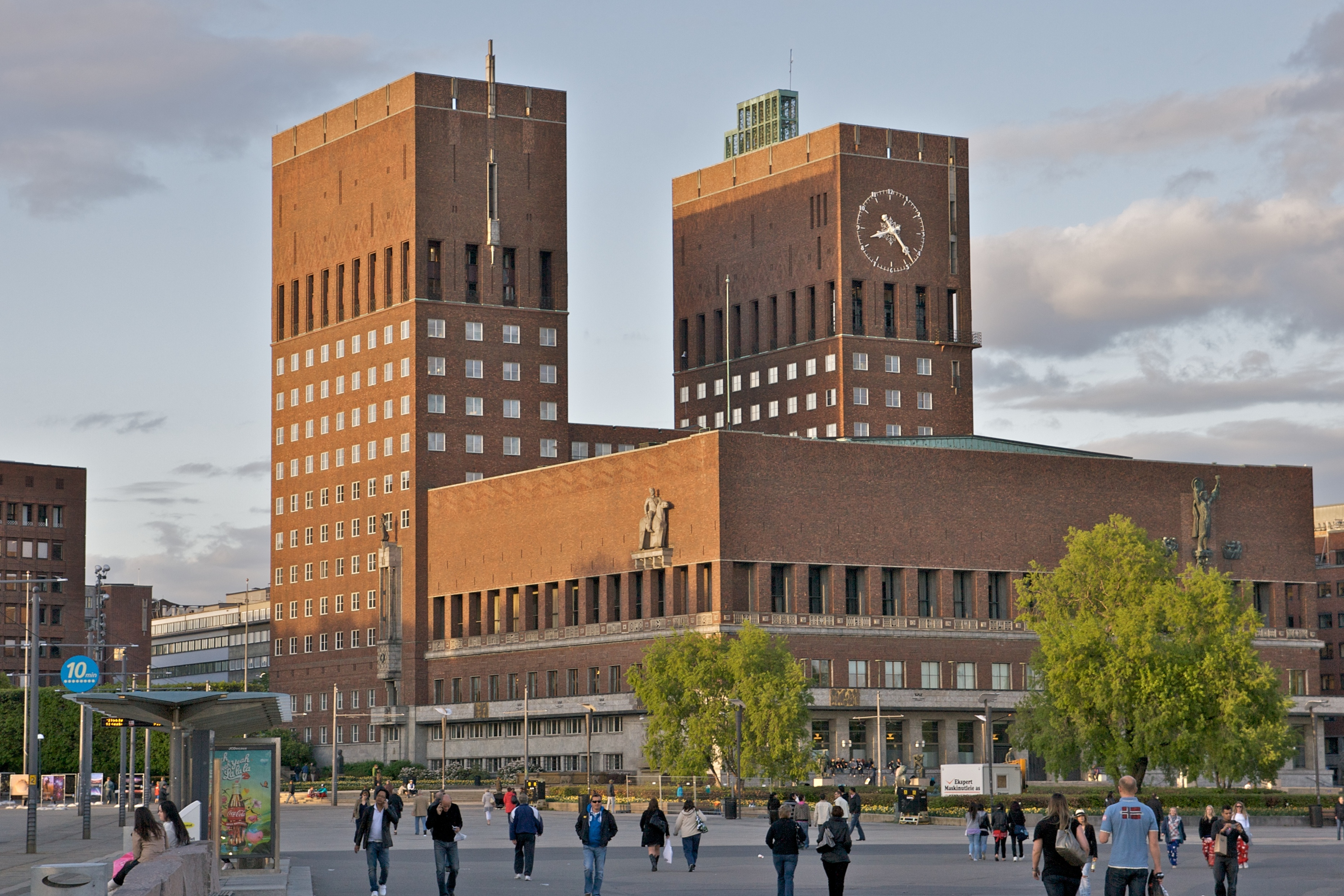
Oslo City Hall

- Oslo City Hall

== Philippines ==
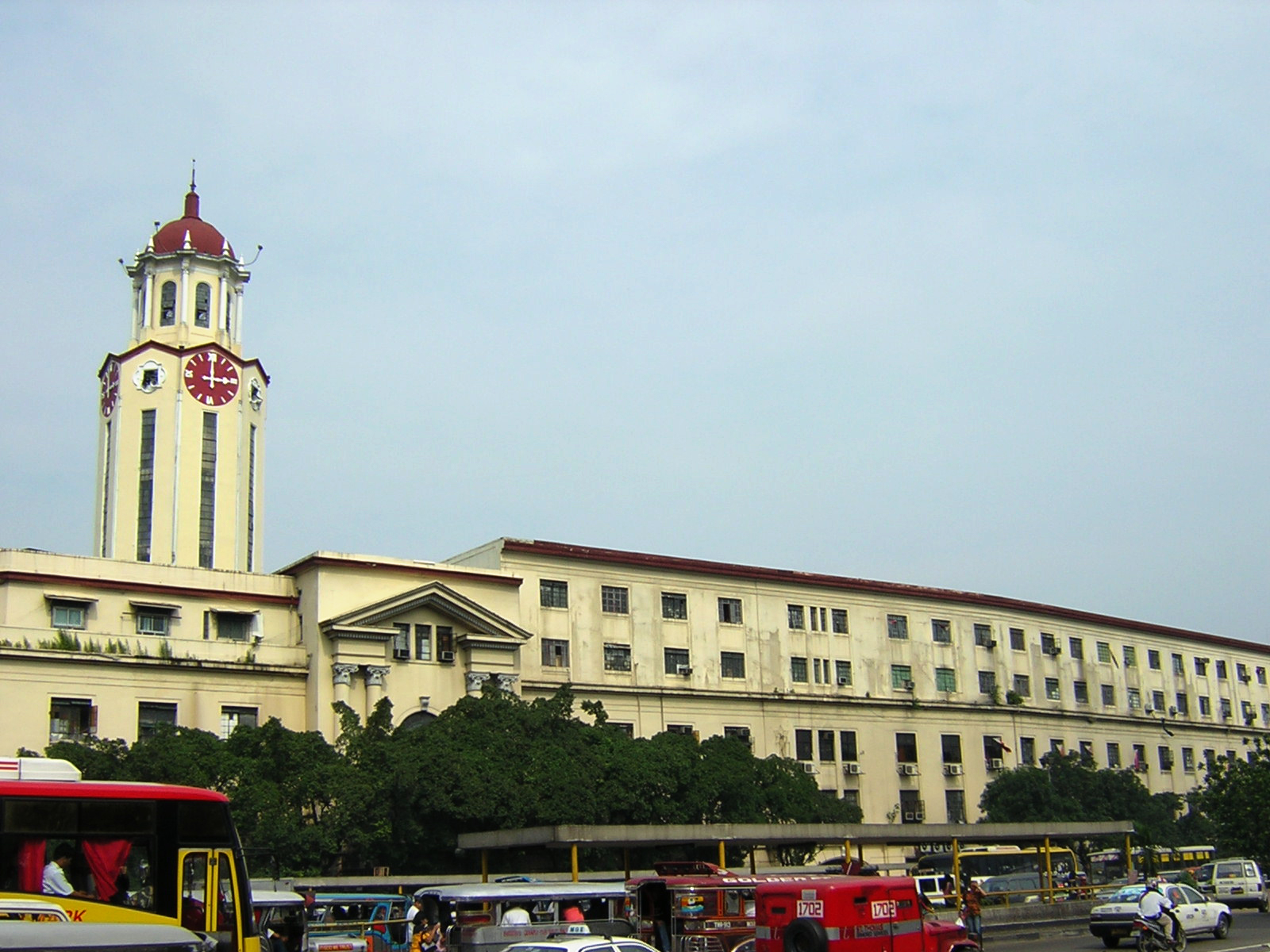
Manila City Hall

- Butuan City Hall complex
- Calamba City Hall
- Cebu City Hall
- City of Bacoor Government Center
- Iloilo City Hall
- Ligao City Hall
- Mandaue Presidencia
- Manila City Hall
- Pagsanjan Municipal Hall
- Quezon City Hall
- Municipio de San Fernando
- Zamboanga City Hall

== Poland ==
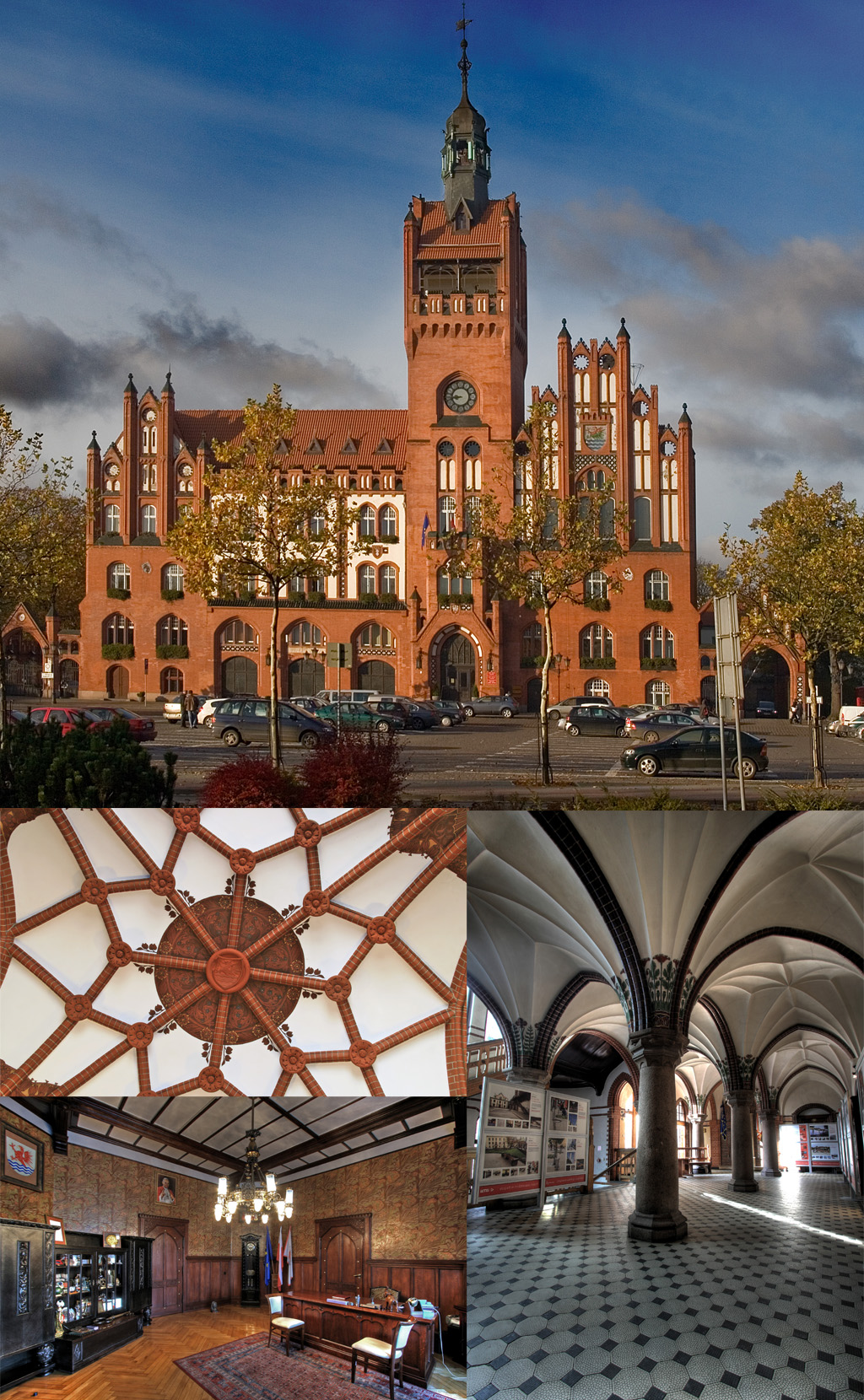
Town Hall of Słupsk, Poland

- Commission Palace in Warsaw
- Brzeg Town Hall
- Byczyna Town Hall
- Cieszyn Town Hall
- Gdańsk Town Hall
- Głogówek Town Hall
- Głubczyce Town Hall
- Grodków Town Hall
- Iława Town Hall
- Kluczbork Town Hall
- Kraków Town Hall
- Lewin Brzeski Town Hall
- Lublin New Town Hall
- Namysłów Town Hall
- Nowe Warpno Town Hall
- Olesno Town Hall
- Opole Town Hall
- Otmuchów Town Hall
- Paczków Town Hall
- Poznań City Hall
- Prudnik Town Hall
- Sandomierz Town Hall
- Toruń Town Hall (museum)
- Słupsk Town Hall
- Strzelce Opolskie Town Hall
- Szczecin Old Town Hall
- Old Town Hall, Szombierki
- Szydłowiec Town Hall
- Warsaw City Hall
- Wrocław Town Hall

== Portugal ==
- Lisbon City Hall
- Braga Town Hall
- Porto City Hall
- Póvoa de Varzim City Hall

== Puerto Rico ==
- Mayagüez City Hall
- Ponce City Hall
- San Juan City Hall

== Romania ==
- Bucharest City Hall

== Russia ==
- City Hall and City Duma
- Mariinsky Palace
- Moscow City Hall
- Saint Petersburg City Duma

== San Marino ==
- Palazzo Pubblico (San Marino)

== Serbia ==
- Belgrade
- Sremski Karlovci City Hall
- Subotica City Hall

== Slovakia ==
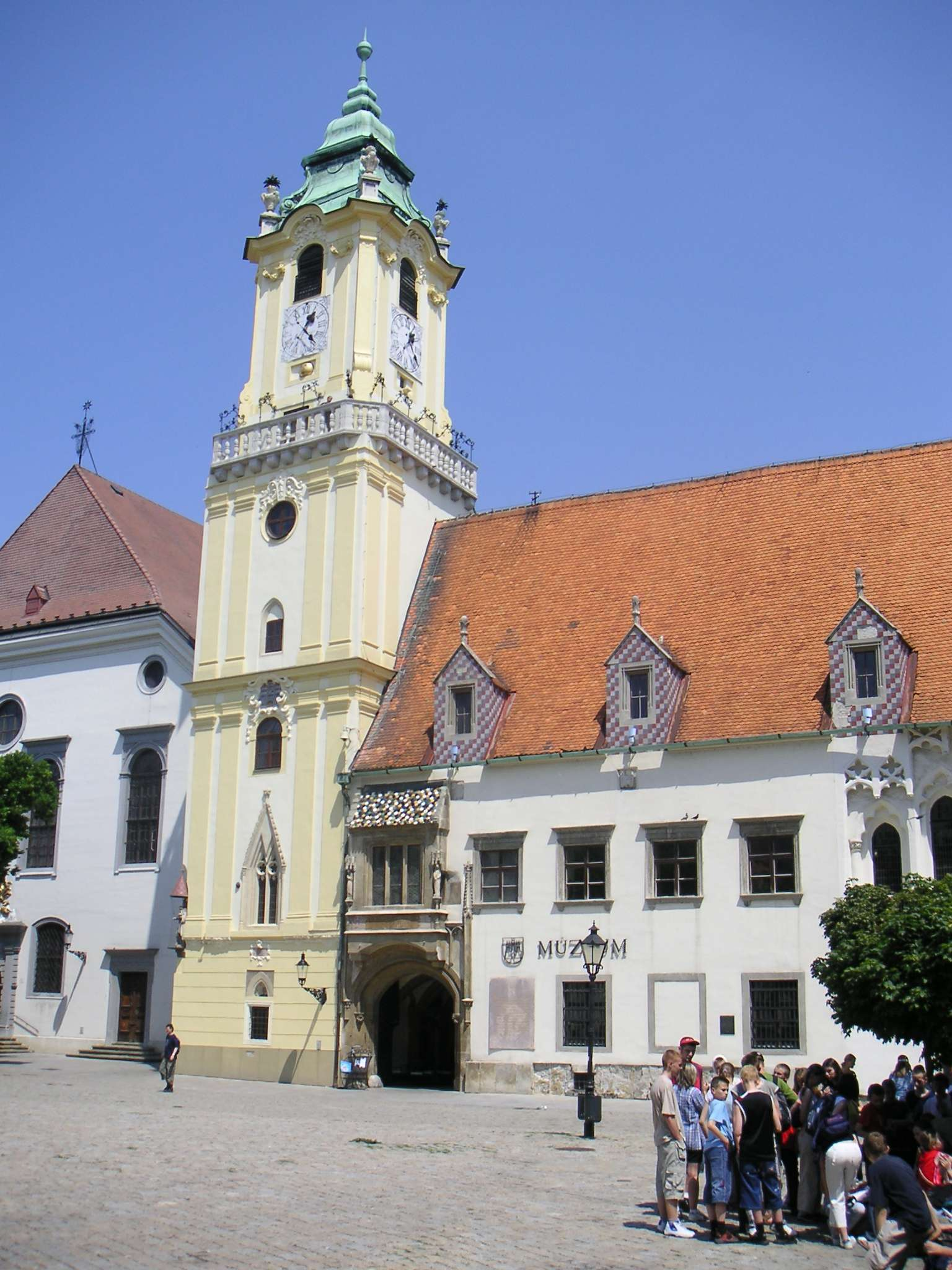
Old Town Hall in Bratislava (Slovakia)

- Old Town Hall (Bratislava)
- Old Town Hall (Levoča)
- Town Hall in Bardejov

== Slovenia ==
- Ljubljana Town Hall
- Maribor Town Hall

== South Africa ==
- Cape Town City Hall
- Pretoria City Hall
- Johannesburg City Hall
- Bloemfontein City Hall

== Spain ==
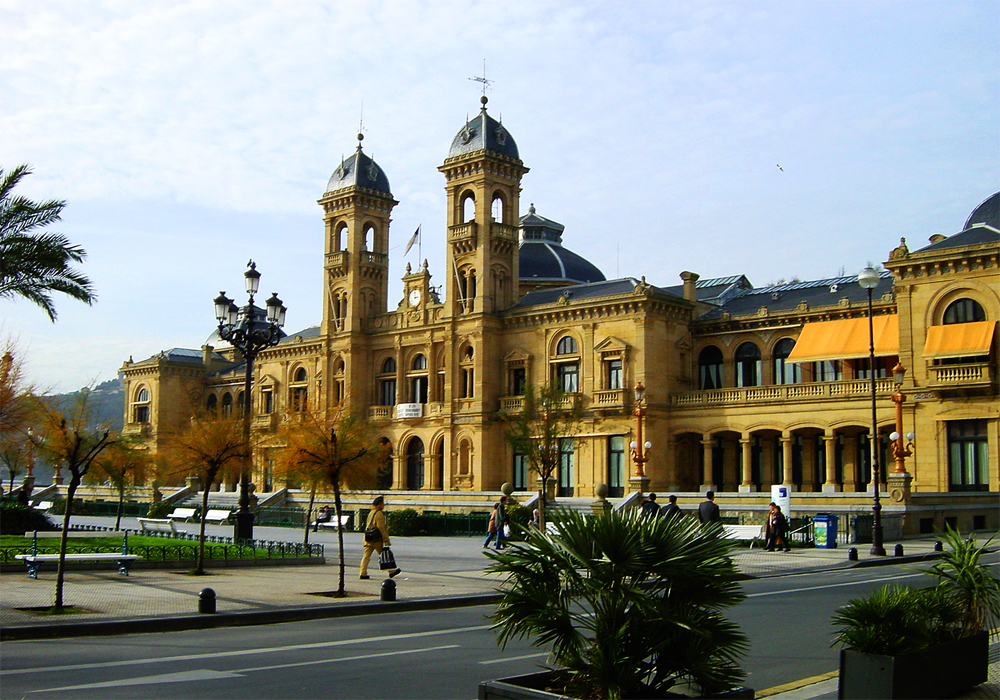
San Sebastián City Hall

- Madrid City Hall
- Bilbao City Hall
- San Sebastián City Hall
- Salamanca City Hall
- Melgar de Fernamental Town Hall

== Sri Lanka ==
- Town Hall, Colombo

== Sweden ==
- Ludvika Town Hall
- Stockholm City Hall
- Malmö Town Hall

== Switzerland ==
- Basel Town Hall
- Rathaus Berneck
- Rathaus Rapperswil
- Zunfthaus zur Waag
- Zurich Town Hall

== Taiwan ==
- New Taipei City Hall
- Taipei City Hall
- Zhongshan Hall (historical)

== Ukraine ==
- Kyiv City Duma building
- Buchach Town Hall
- Ivano-Frankivsk Town Hall
- Lviv Town Hall
- Odesa City Hall

== Vietnam ==
Each province, municipality, city and district has a People's Committee (executive) and a People's Council (legislative) For example:

- People's Committee of Hanoi and People's Council of Hanoi
- People's Committee of Ho Chi Minh City and People's Council of Ho Chi Minh City

== See also ==
- City hall
