= Opole Town Hall =

Coordinates: 50.6685°N 17.9221°E

Ratusz w Opolu (Opole Town Hall)
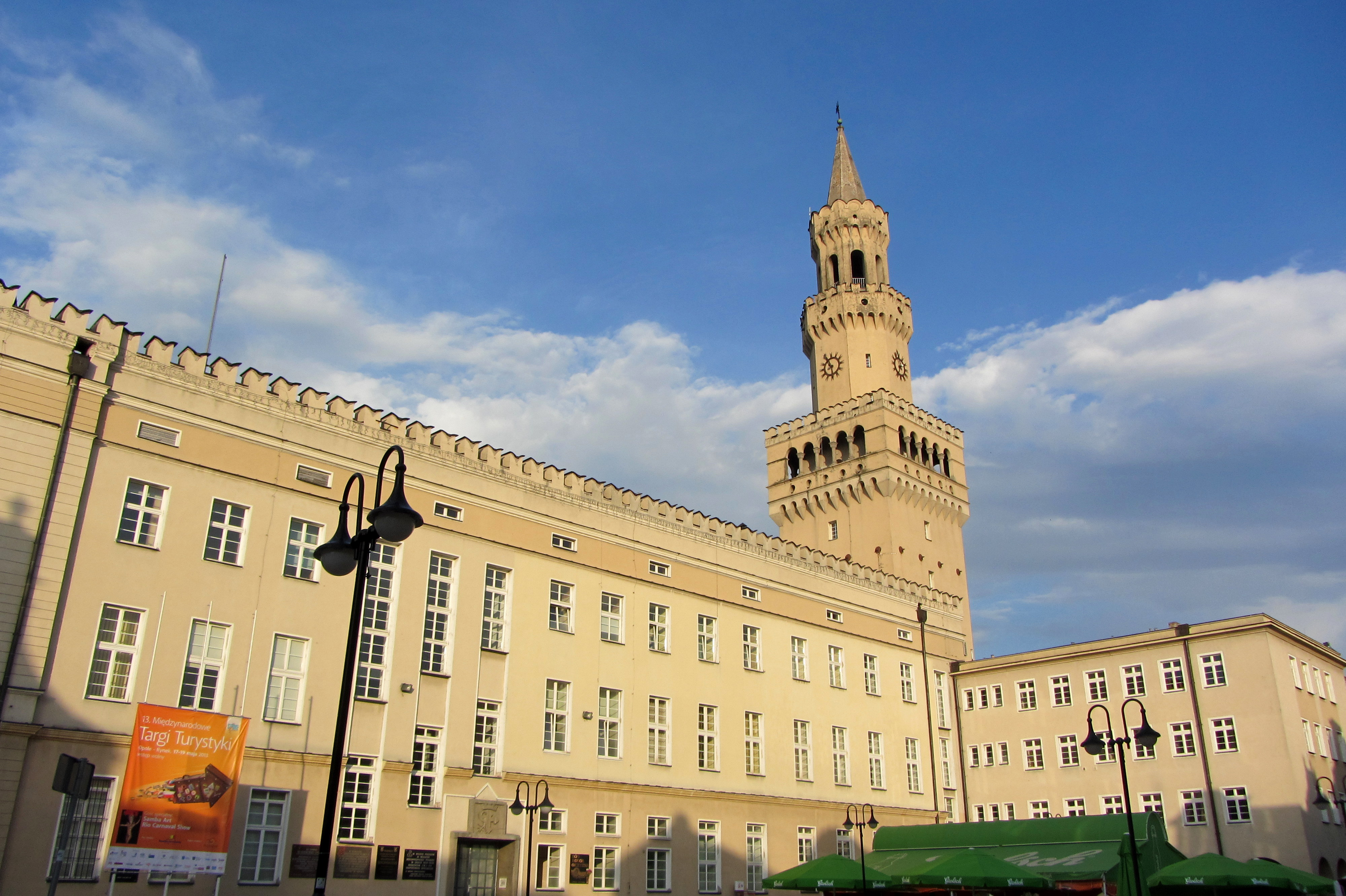
- Opole Town Hall
- Interactive map of the Ratusz w Opolu (Opole Town Hall) area

General information
- Type: Town hall
- Architectural style: Neo-Renaissance
- Location: Opole, Poland
- Construction started: 1864 (tower)
- Completed: 1936

Height
- Height: 65 m (tower)

Opole Town Hall - a town hall built in the Neo-Renaissance architectural style in the Śródmieście borough in Opole. The town hall was built on the exemplar of the Palazzo Vecchio in Florence, Italy.

== History ==
In the Middle Ages, in the location of the current town hall was a wooden townhouse, in the fifteenth-century a decision was made to build a brick structure - the town hall, which was to be the seat of the local authorities. In the sixteenth-century a clock tower was built. It is known that in the eighteenth-century there was a pranger located in the Market Square (Rynek), by which in 1794 an insurgent peasant, Markus der Gerechte, was flogged. In 1740, a Baroque dome was built. In 1818 a fire destroyed the whole tower down to the foundations. Between 1818 and 1826 a thorough reconstruction of the town hall complex was carried out, this included the rebuilding of the tower in the former shape, with the dome covered with gold for 150 Thaler.

In 1860 or 1863, during restoration works, it was uncovered that the whole strained tower had to be deconstructed. In 1864, under the custody of architect Albrecht, a new 60 metre tower was built, on the exemplar of the Palazzo Vecchio in Florence, Italy.

In 1933, the Market Square was reconstructed, this included the deconstruction of nearby townhouses, the tower, which was not secured, collapsed on the morning of June 15, 1934. In 1936, a similar 65 metre high tower was built. The town hall was not bombarded during World War II, and continues to be the seat of the Opole City Council.

Each day a bugle call (Hejnał Opola) is performed from the town hall's tower.
