= Hafnarfjörður Town Hall =

- Ráðhúsið í Hafnarfirði
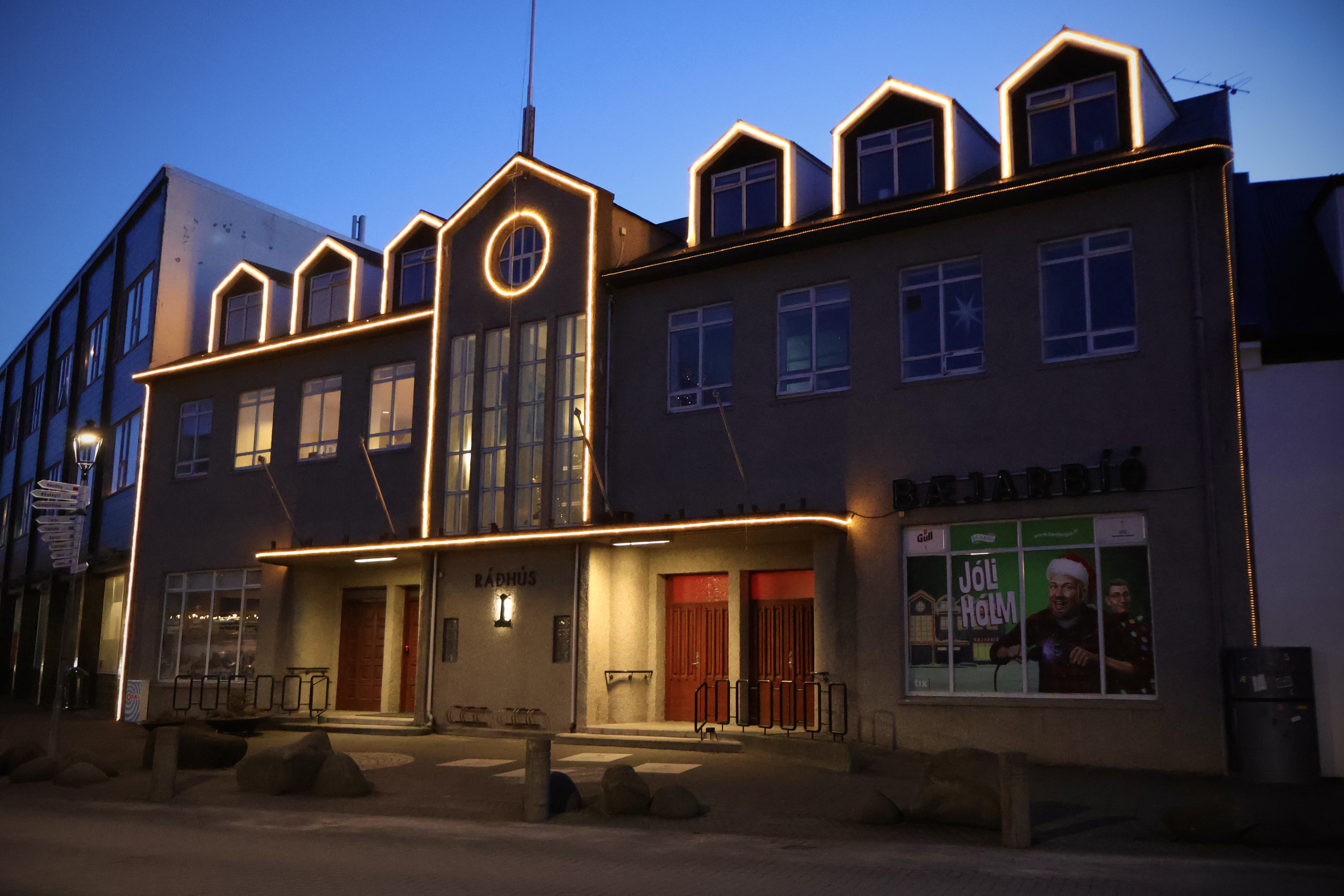
- The Town Hall in Hafnarfjörður, January 2025.

General information
- Address: Strandgata 6
- Town or city: Hafnarfjörður
- Country: Iceland
- Coordinates: 64°04′10″N 21°57′28″W
- Completed: 1942
- Owner: Hafnarfjarðarkaupstaður

Design and construction
- Architect(s): Sigmundur Halldórsson

The Hafnarfjörður Town Hall (Icelandic: Ráðhúsið í Hafnarfirði) is located in the city centre of Hafnarfjörður. The building houses the Town Council, as well as Bæjarbíó—the oldest operating cinema in Iceland.

== History ==
The building was constructed in 1942 by the Municipality of Hafnarfjörður, designated to serve as a town hall as well as a cinema. It was designed by architect Sigmundur Halldórsson and its first owner was the Hafnarfjörður Municipal Fund.

The Hafnarfjörður Town Hall building is the first of its kind in the country, being the first purpose-built town hall in Iceland. Since then, it has become inadequate for its intended administrative purpose as a result of its small size, measuring a surface area of 1094,3 m^{2}. Consequently, in 2023, Hafnarfjarðarkaupstaður purchased the adjacent building of Íslandsbanki on Strandgata 8-10 to house its administration, with the sale totalling 350 million krones.
