= Iława Town Hall =

Coordinates: 53.5973°N 19.5611°E

Town hall of Iława
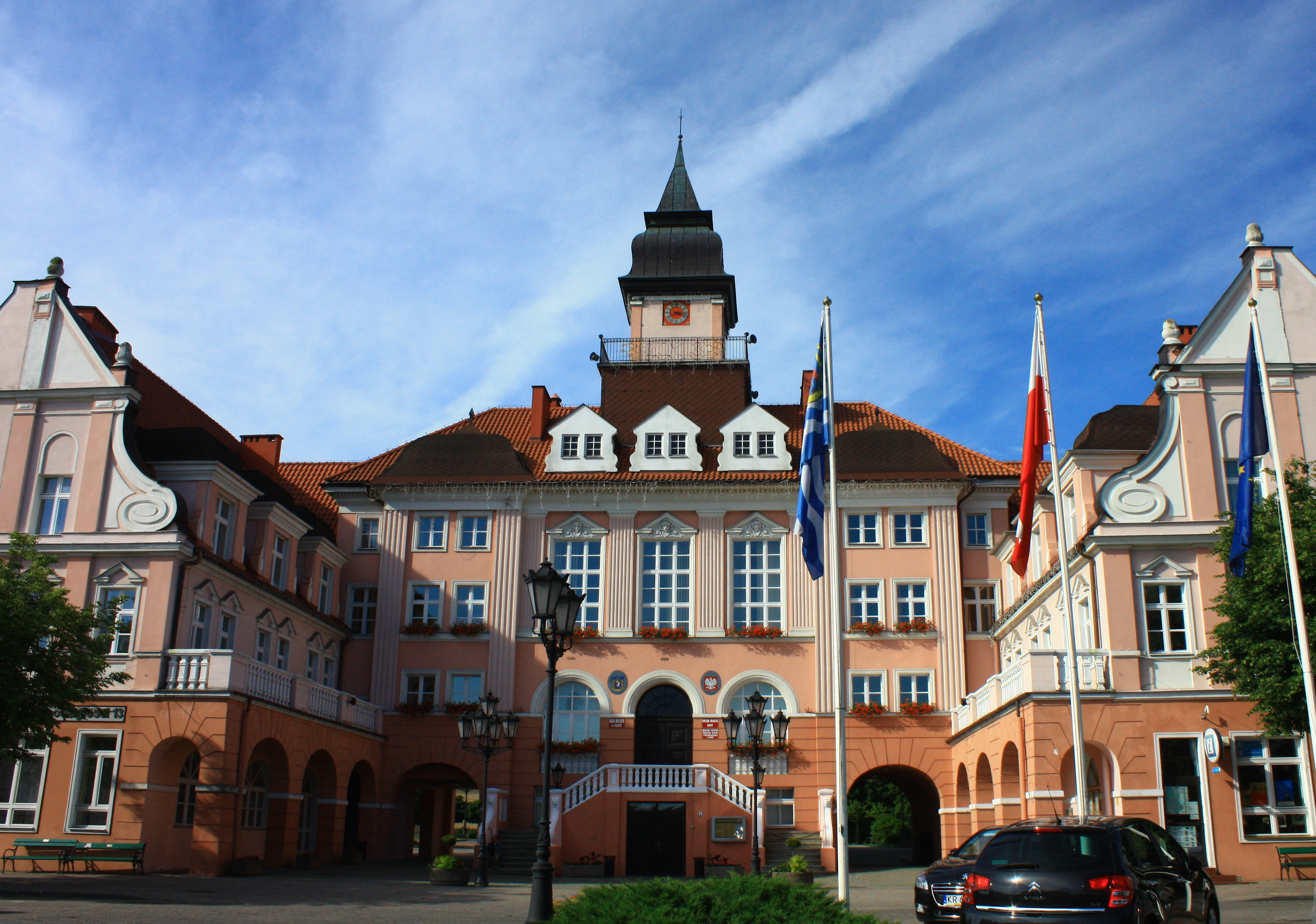
- Iława Town Hall
- Interactive map of the Town hall of Iława area

General information
- Architectural style: Neo-baroque
- Location: ul. Niepodległości 13, Iława, Poland
- Construction started: ca. 1910
- Completed: ca. 1912
- Cost: 290,000 PLN

Iława Town Hall is a neo-Baroque town hall in Iława at ul. Niepodległości 13, built in 1910–1912 during the term of office of the then mayor of Iława, Karl Friedrich Giese, at a time when the city's successful economic situation made it possible to take a decision on the construction of the city hall after long decades. It was built in the green area of the old town moat. The purchase price of land for its construction was PLN 90,000, and the costs of construction, including interior design, exceeded PLN 200,000. The town hall was destroyed during II World War and rebuilt during the Communist era, when it served as a market hall. In 1995 it underwent a major overhaul. Since then, it has been the seat of the mayor and the city council. The building also accommodates:

- Tourist Information
- Municipal Guard Headquarters
- School and Kindergarten Service Office
- Registry Office

The building has been under conservation protection and entered in the register of monuments on 19 November 1994 (register number 1534).

== Architecture ==
The building of the town hall consists of several parts and was erected on a rather extended projection. One of the most interesting elements of the main (central) part are the external stairs located on both sides of the main entrance to the Town Hall. They are impressive, and the lower part of the stairs is covered on both sides with huge and massive volutes. Each of them ends with a small relief in the form of a lion's head with an open mouth. There are three high windows on the upper floor separated from each other by Tuscan pilasters with perfectly visible canals(nurseries). Above the windows, there are triangular heads with human masks in the form of middle decoration. Above, there is anIonic frieze crowning the façade, and in the part of the roof there are three façades, crowned with a two-stage tower with a terrace, a dial and a helmet.

The wings of the building are nowadays widened, as they originally constituted a half of the current eastern and western wing. However, the architectural elements were constructed in the form of large volutes supporting the peaks from the side of the courtyard, and on the axis of the pilasters (on the roof) there are statues in the form of small vases (or, as some claim, acorns).

The inner parts of the sashes are basket arcades carrying the terrace bounded by a balustrade, and in the arcades large and wide windows ending in a basket arch. South side it is a modern extension, on both sides of the road, with quarter-circle bays at both corners and only in the eastern part (in the roof part) of the façade. West wing is a portico supported by five semi-circular and wide arcades, and there is a semi-circular bay window at floor level. Above, of course, in the part of the roof, there are three small façades.

== Bibliography ==
- Monografia "Iława", Towarzystwo Miłośników Ziemi Iławskiej, 1999, ISBN 83-87643-75-0.
- Iławianie o historii miasta i okolic, A. Błędowska, M. Czerny, R. Sobieraj, Iława: Towarzystwo Miłośników Ziemii Iławskiej, 2005, ISBN 83-923350-0-7

== Gallery ==
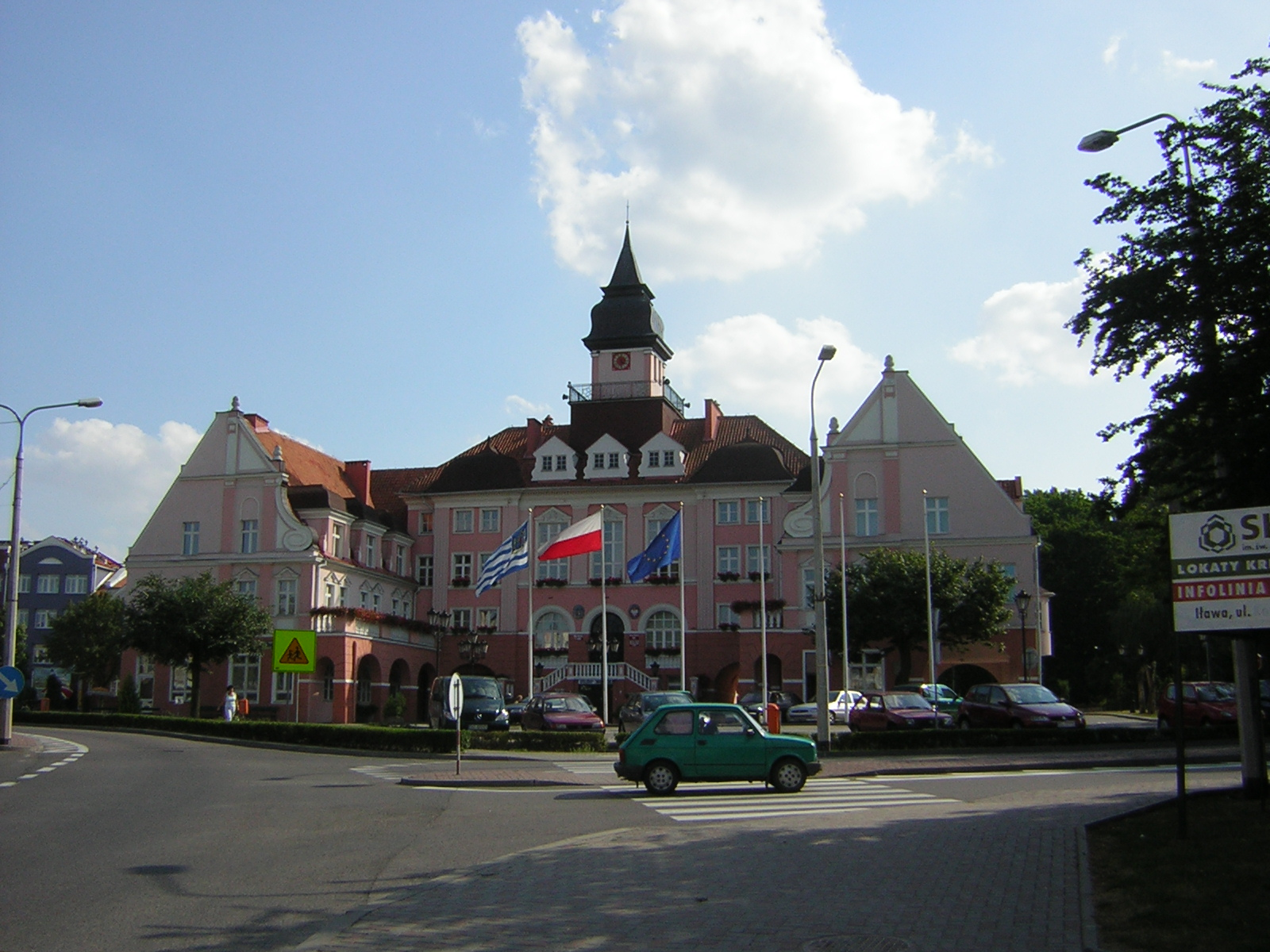
The town hall

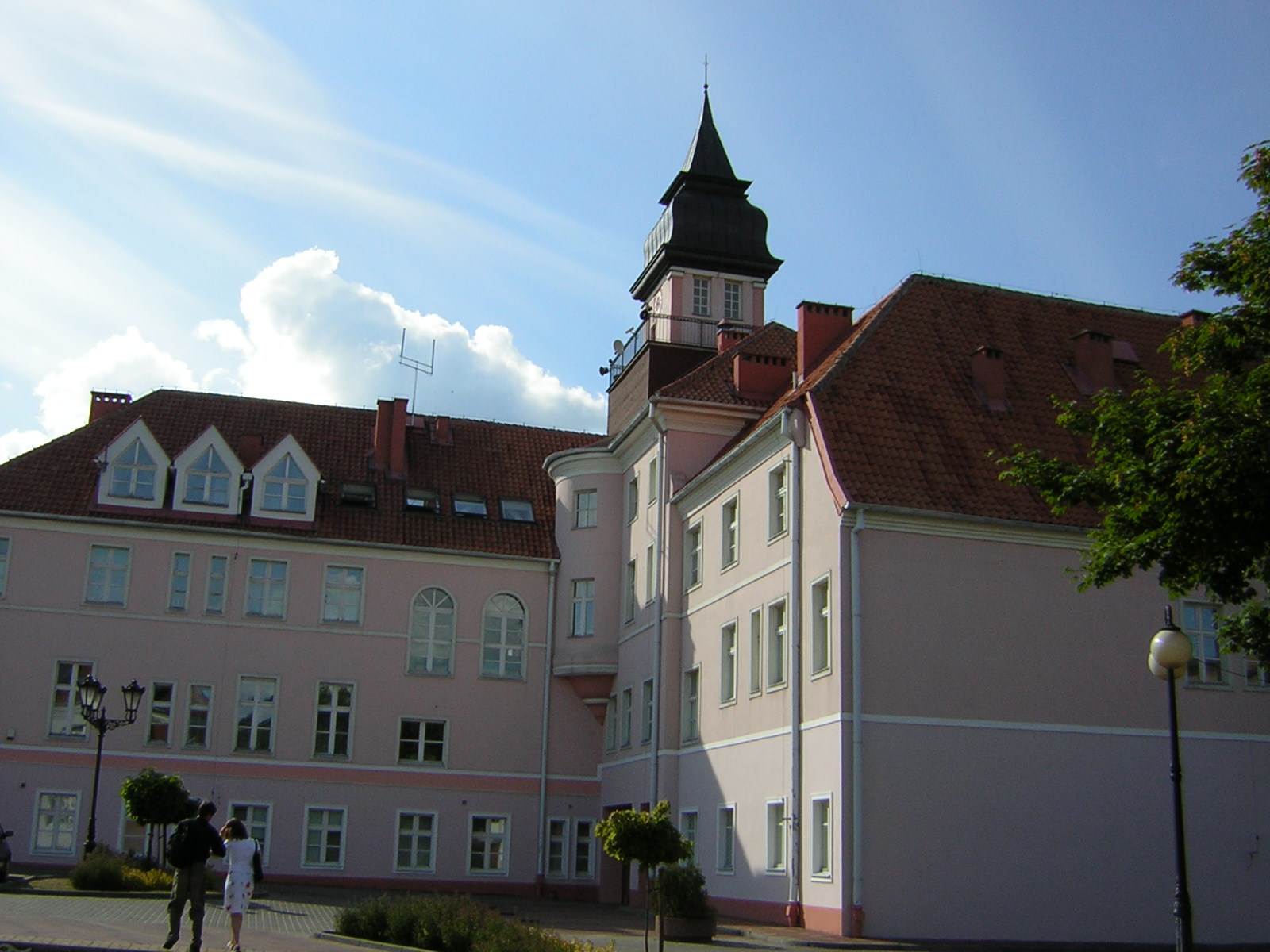
South-western side

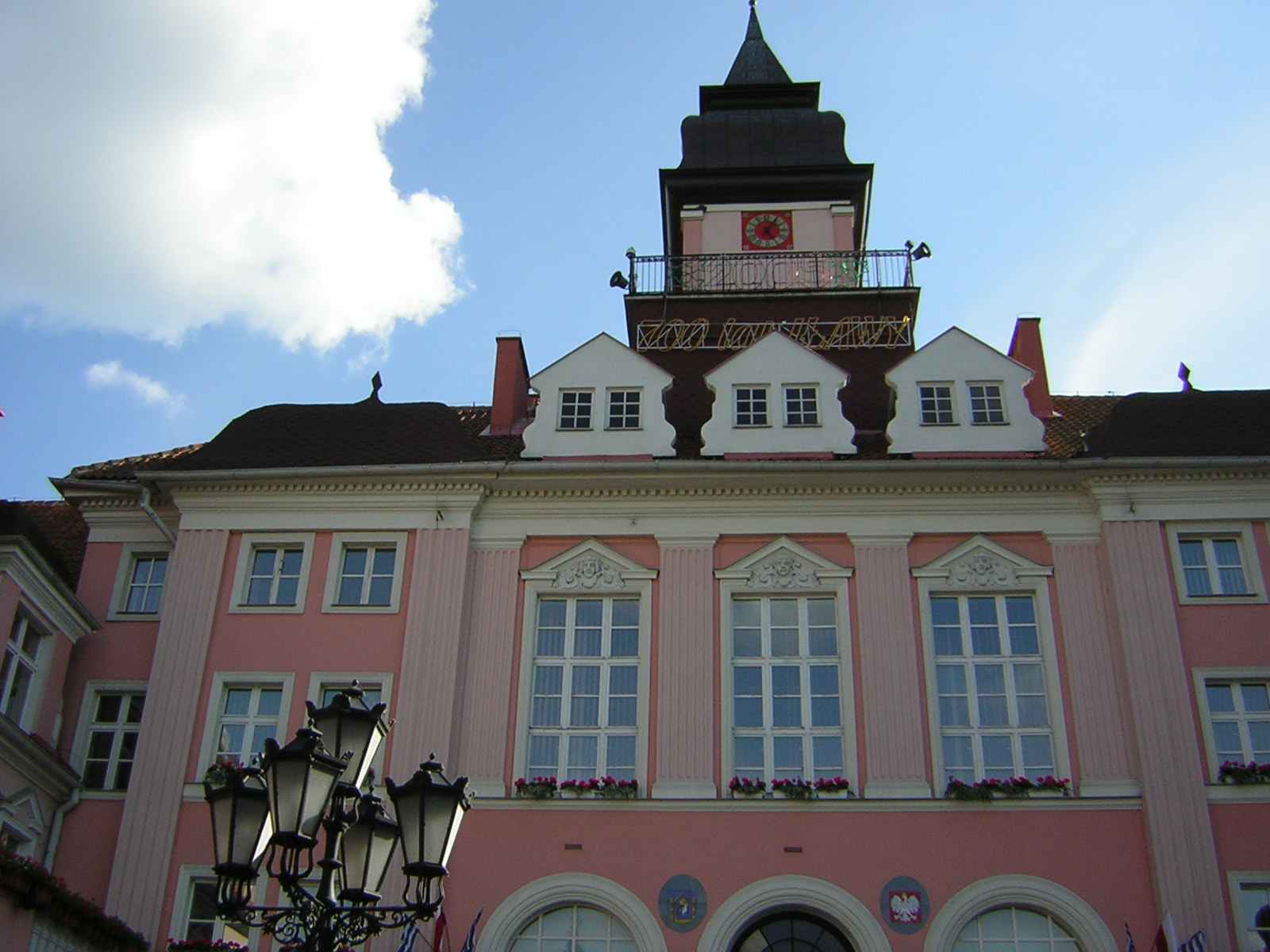
North side
