= Old Town Hall, Levoča =

Historic building in Levoča, Slovakia

- Historická radnica v Levoči
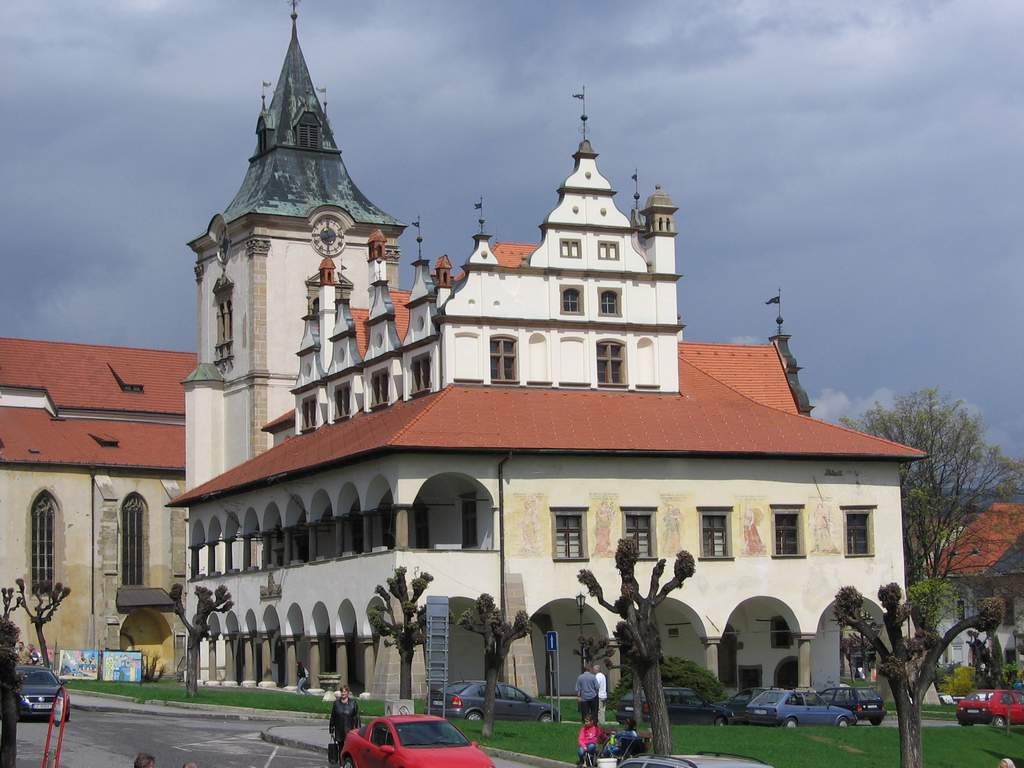
- View of the Old Town Hall from the south-west

- Location of the Old Town Hall in the Prešov Region Location of the Old Town Hall in Slovakia

General information
- Location: Levoča, Slovakia
- Coordinates: 49.0257°N 20.5887°E
- Year built: 15th century

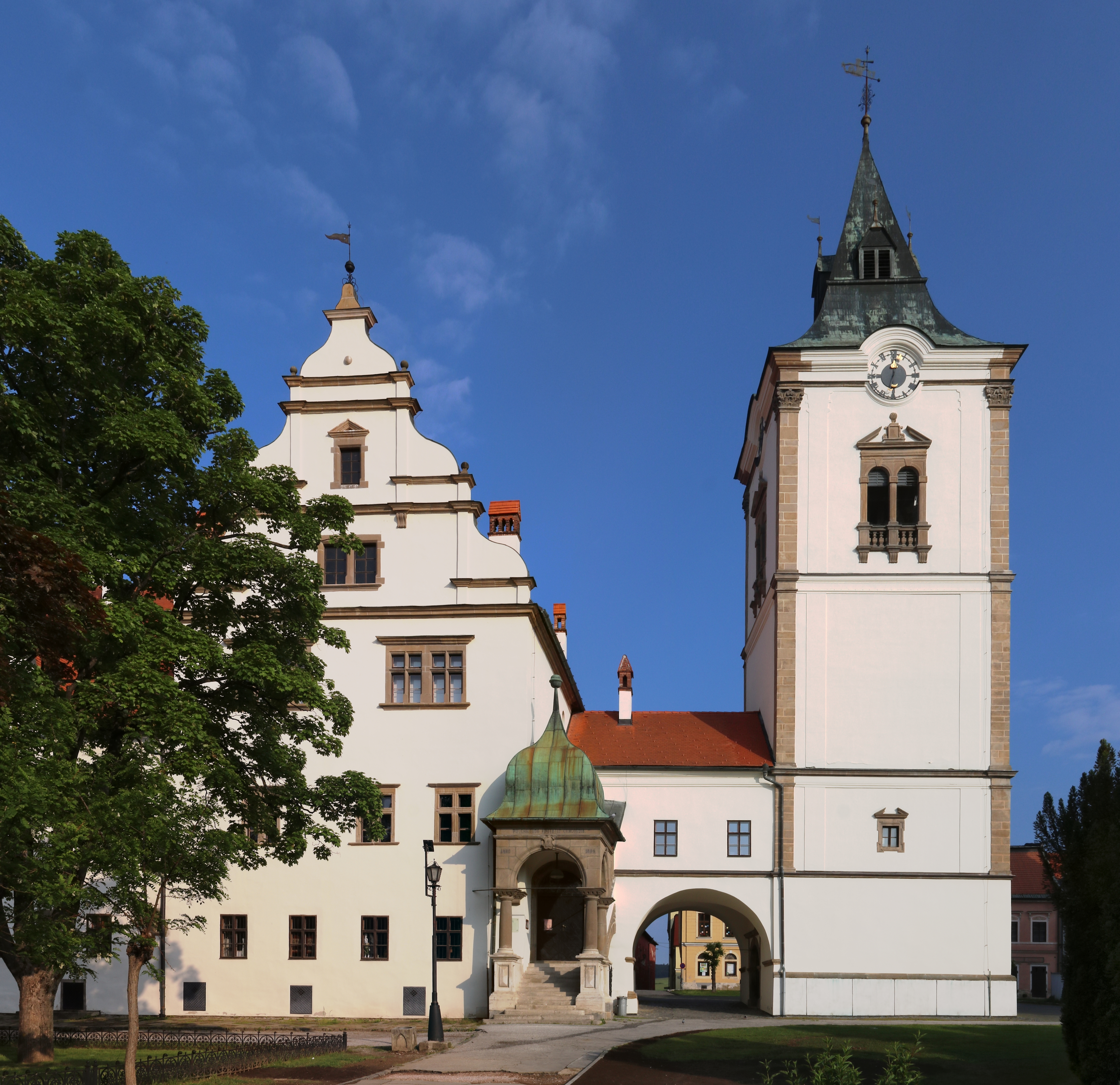
Old Town Hall - view of eastern side

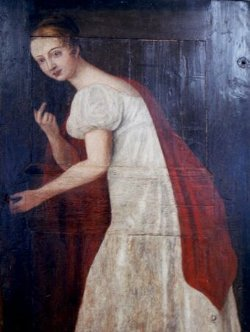
Painting of "The White Lady of Levoca" (c. 1860)

The Old Town Hall (Slovak: Historická radnica v Levoči) in the UNESCO World Heritage town of Levoča, Slovakia was originally built in the 15th century, and stands in the town's main square.

The original gothic building was destroyed in 1550 during a fire which ravaged the town, and only fragments of the original walls were preserved. It was further damaged by a fire in 1599. The town hall in its existing form was built in 1615 in a Renaissance style, with arcades on the ground and first floors, and a belfry was added in 1656–61. Wall-paintings on the southern facade represent the virtues of moderation, care, bravery, patience and justice. The whole was later reconstructed in 1893–95.

The building is now maintained by the Spiš Museum, Levoča a department of the Slovak National Museum. It contains the original town council chamber and a variety of exhibits relating to the town's history, including a popular 19th-century painting of the "White Lady", Juliana Géciová-Korponaiová, (1680-1714) who according to (inaccurate) legend betrayed the town to troops of the Austrian Empire in the early 18th century.
