= Ligao City Hall =

Government building in Albay, Philippines

Coordinates: 13°14′20″N 123°31′58″E

Ligao City Hall is where the Office of the City Mayor and other city government officials is located. It is located in Sta Cruz, Ligao City. The current city mayor of Ligao is Fernando V. Gonzalez while the City Vice Mayor is Jaypee M. David. The current building was inaugurated on March 24th, 2022.

The Ligao City hall used to be called Ligao Municipal or Town Hall before it officially became a city on March 24, 2001.
