= Lublin New Town Hall =

Coordinates: 51.1451°N 22.3356°E

Nowy Ratusz w Lublinie (Lublin New Town Hall)
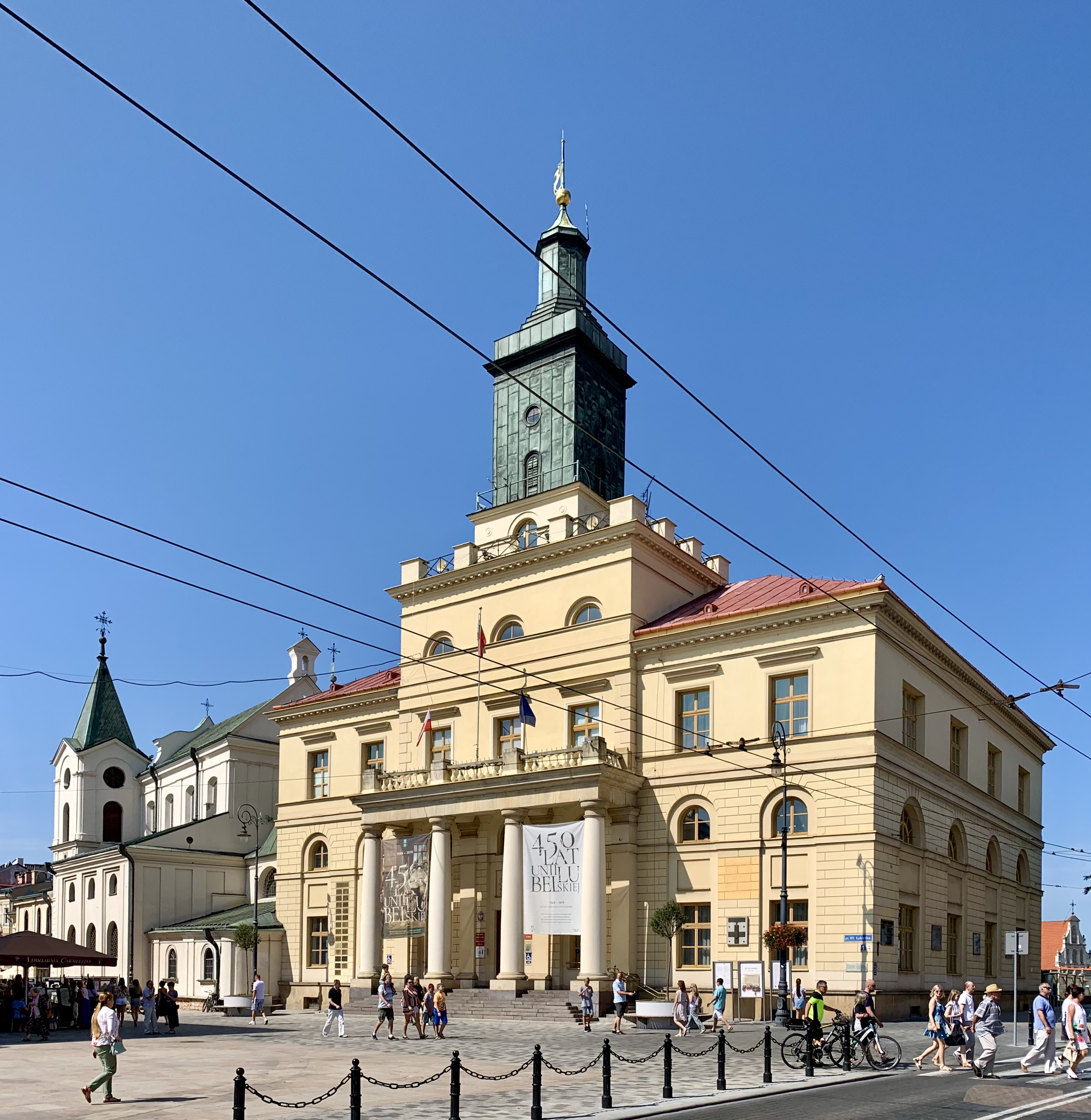
- Lublin Town Hall
- Interactive map of the Nowy Ratusz w Lublinie (Lublin New Town Hall) area

General information
- Type: Town hall
- Architectural style: Classicism
- Location: Lublin, Poland
- Construction started: 1827
- Completed: 1828

Lublin New Town Hall is a town hall built in the Classical architectural style in between 1827 and 1828, in Lublin, Poland. It is located on plac Króla Władysława Łokietka.

The building was built in the location of a former monastery of Discalced Carmelites.

The present day town hall continues to function as the seat for the local authorities, being the seat of the President of Lublin and the Youth City Council.
