= Strzelce Opolskie Town Hall =

Coordinates: 50.5113°N 18.3011°E

Ratusz w Strzelcach Opolskich (Strzelce Opolskie Town Hall)
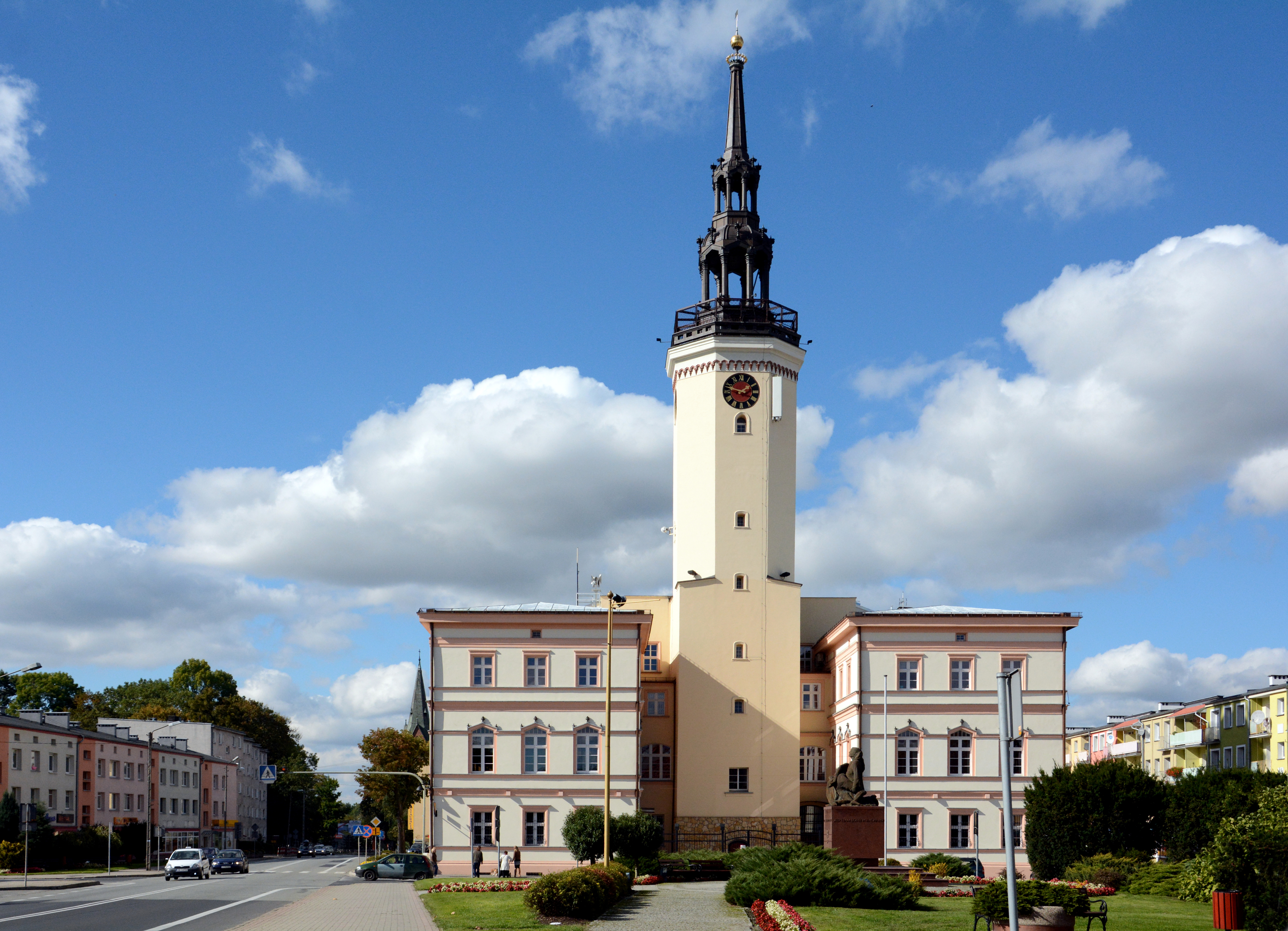
- Strzelce Opolski Town Hall
- Interactive map of the Ratusz w Strzelcach Opolskich (Strzelce Opolskie Town Hall) area

General information
- Type: Town hall
- Architectural style: Neo-Gothic
- Location: Strzelce Opolskie, Poland
- Construction started: 1844
- Completed: 1846

Strzelce Opolskie Town Hall - a Neo-Gothic building built between 1844 and 1846, in the location of a former, destroyed by fires town hall. In 1911, the town hall was reconstructed, in 1945 partially destroyed, and subsequently restored in the 1960s. Currently, the town hall is the seat for the Strzelce Opolskie City Council.
