= Kluczbork Town Hall =

Coordinates: 50.9729°N 18.2147°E

Ratusz w Kluczborku (Kluczbork Town Hall)
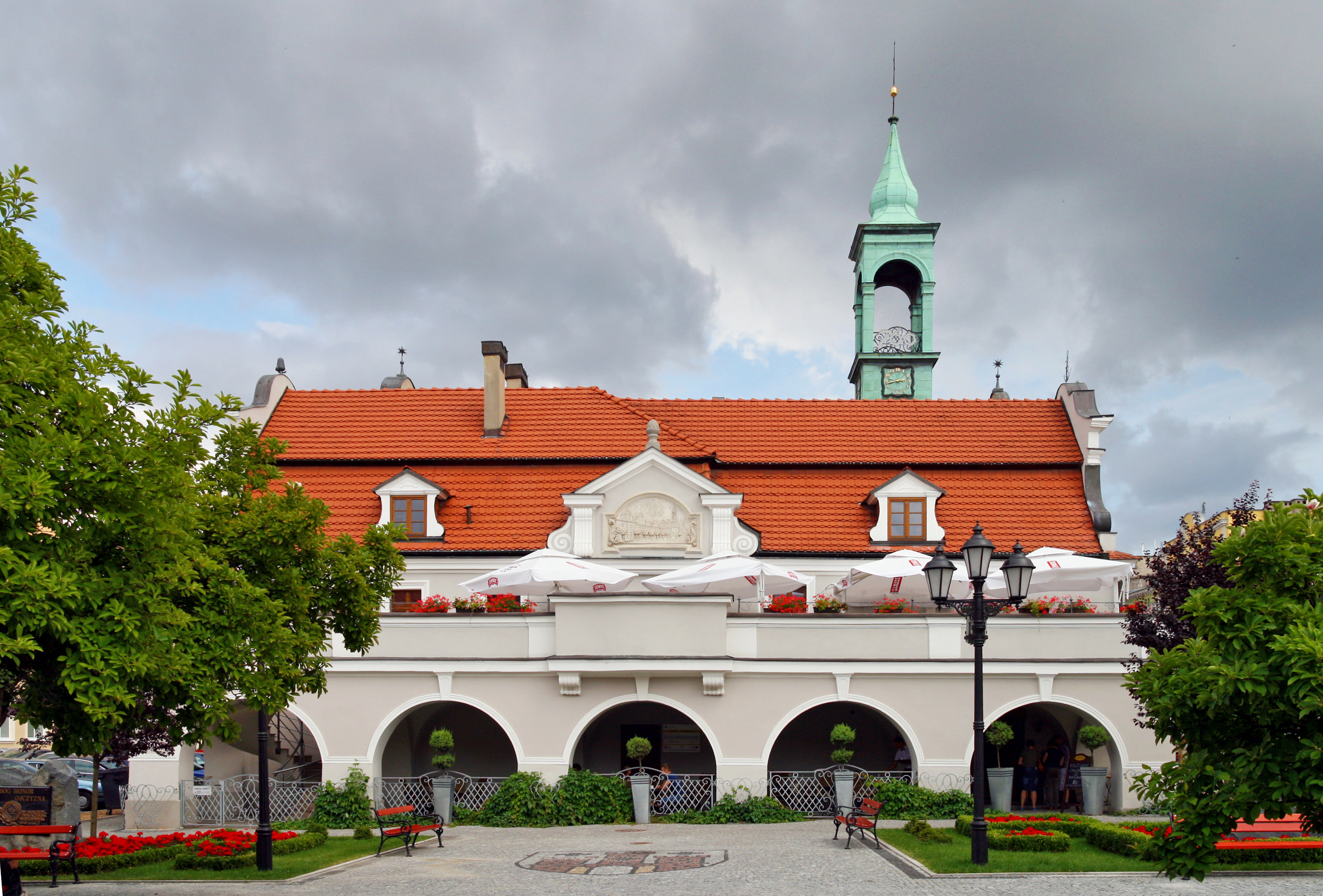
- Kluczbork Town Hall
- Interactive map of the Ratusz w Kluczborku (Kluczbork Town Hall) area

General information
- Type: Town hall
- Architectural style: Renaissance-Baroque
- Location: Kluczbork, Poland
- Completed: 18th century

Kluczbork Town Hall - a Renaissance-Baroque building built in the eighteenth century. The building was renovated and reconstructed in the subsequent centuries, last time in 1926. The building is the seat of a number of institutions, including the Kluczbork City Council and a library. The building was renovated in the years of 2011–2012, during which the access roads to the town hall were also rebuilt.

== Gallery ==
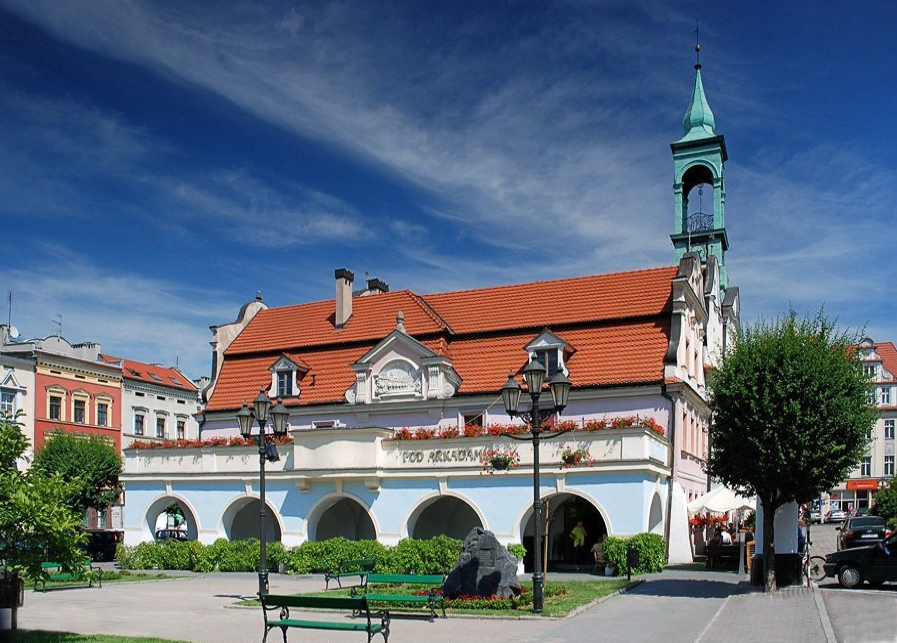

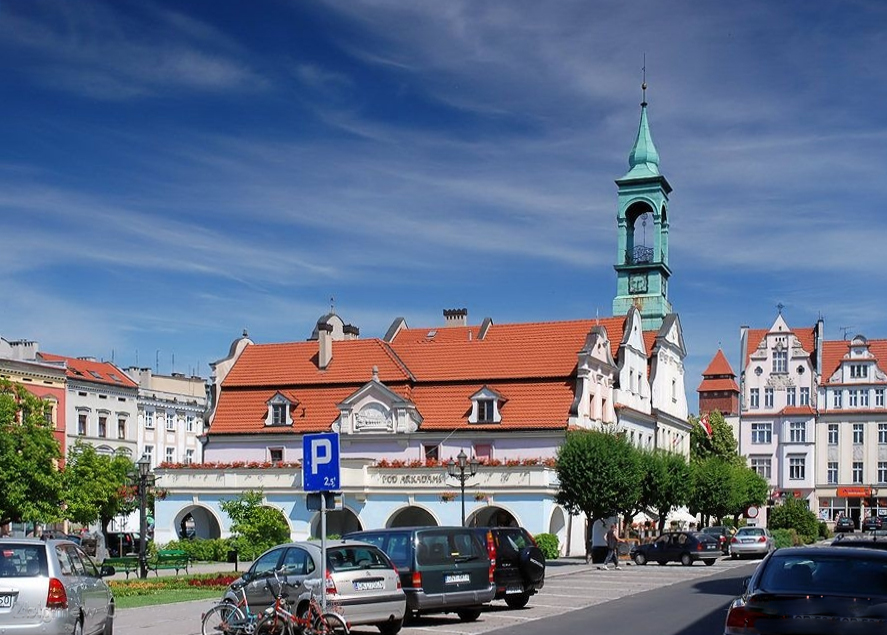

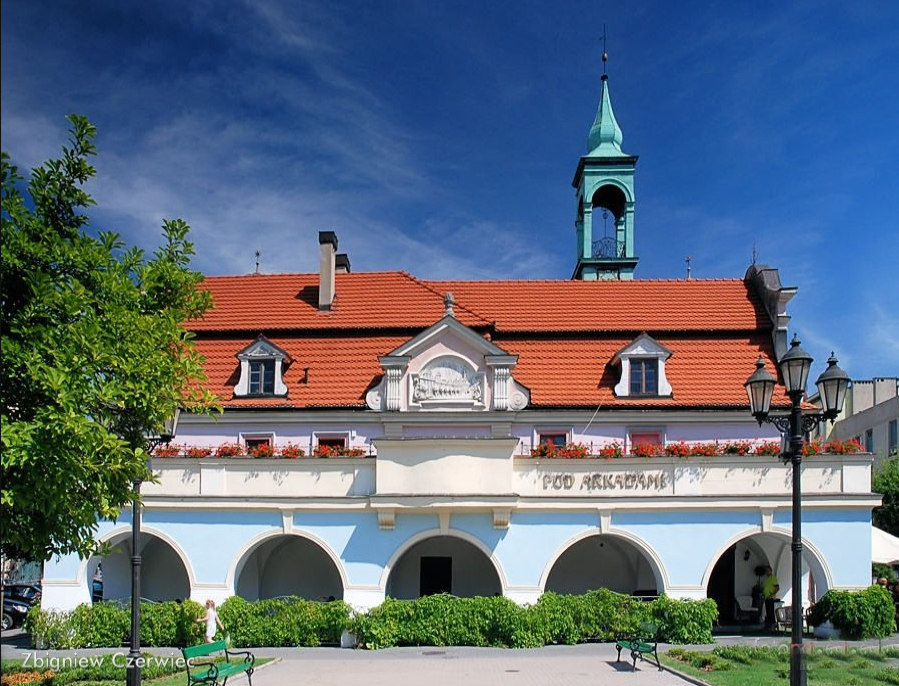
