= Paczków Town Hall =

Ratusz w Paczkowie (Paczków Town Hall)
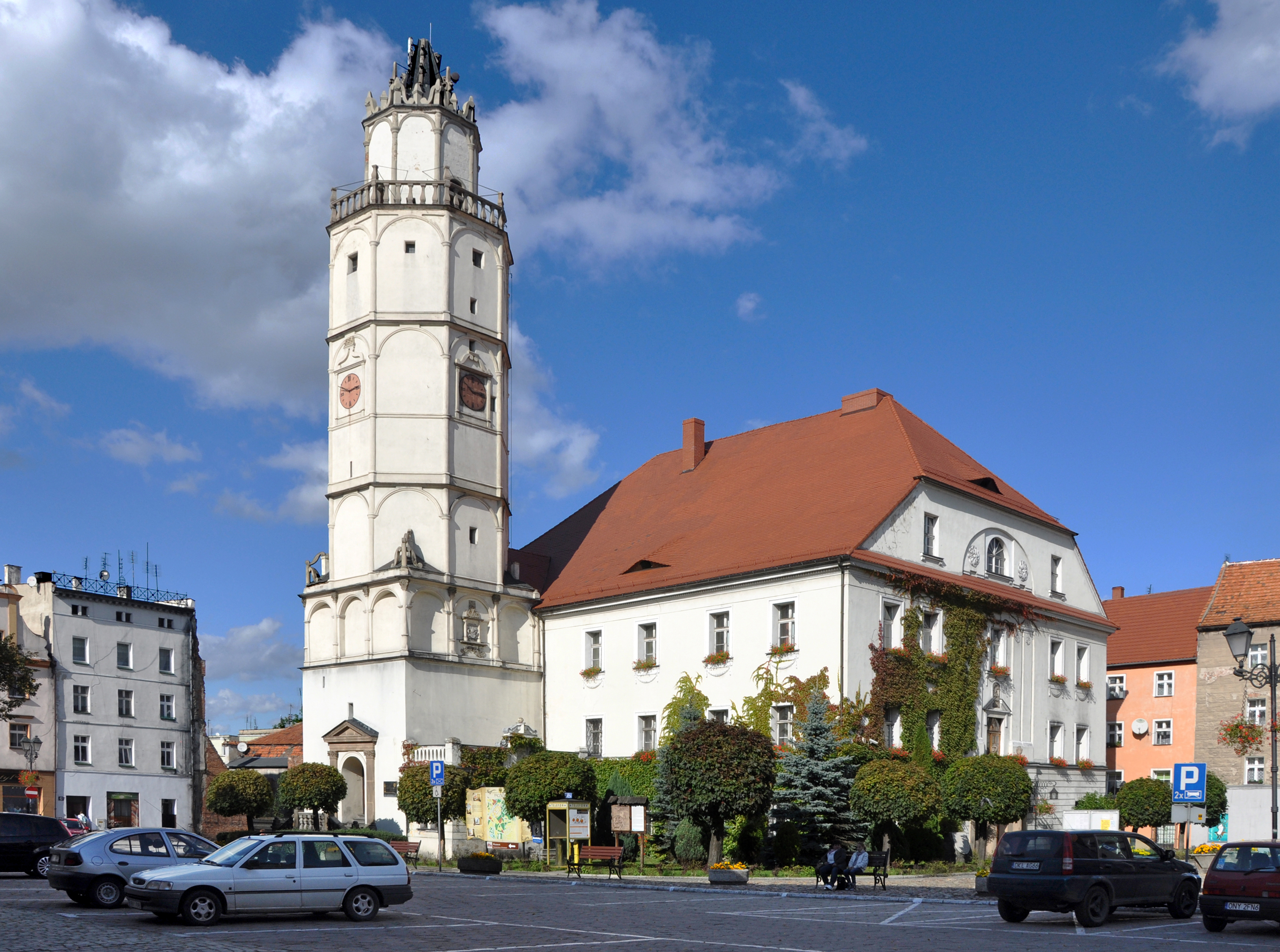
- Paczków Town Hall
- Interactive map of the Ratusz w Paczkowie (Paczków Town Hall) area

General information
- Type: Town hall
- Architectural style: Renaissance, Neoclassicism
- Location: Paczków, Poland
- Coordinates: 50.4641°N 17.0058°E
- Construction started: 1550
- Completed: 1552

Historic Monument of Poland
- Designated: 2012-10-22
- Part of: Paczków – Old Town ensemble with its medieval fortification system
- Reference no.: Dz. U. z 2012 r. poz. 1240

Paczków Town Hall is a historic town hall (ratusz) built in the Renaissance architectural style and later reconstructed into Neoclassicism, is located in the centre of the Market Square (Rynek) in Paczków, Poland. Currently, the town hall is the seat for the Paczków authorities.

== History ==
The town hall was built between 1550 and 1552. The construction of the building was funded by Bishop of Wrocław Baltazar von Promnitz. Formerly, the building was made up of two rectangular buildings, with triangular sides. The town hall underwent an extensive reconstruction between 1821 and 1822, receiving its Neoclassical architectural style. In between 1911 and 1912, the interior of the town hall's Main Hall was decorated with stucco.

== Gallery ==
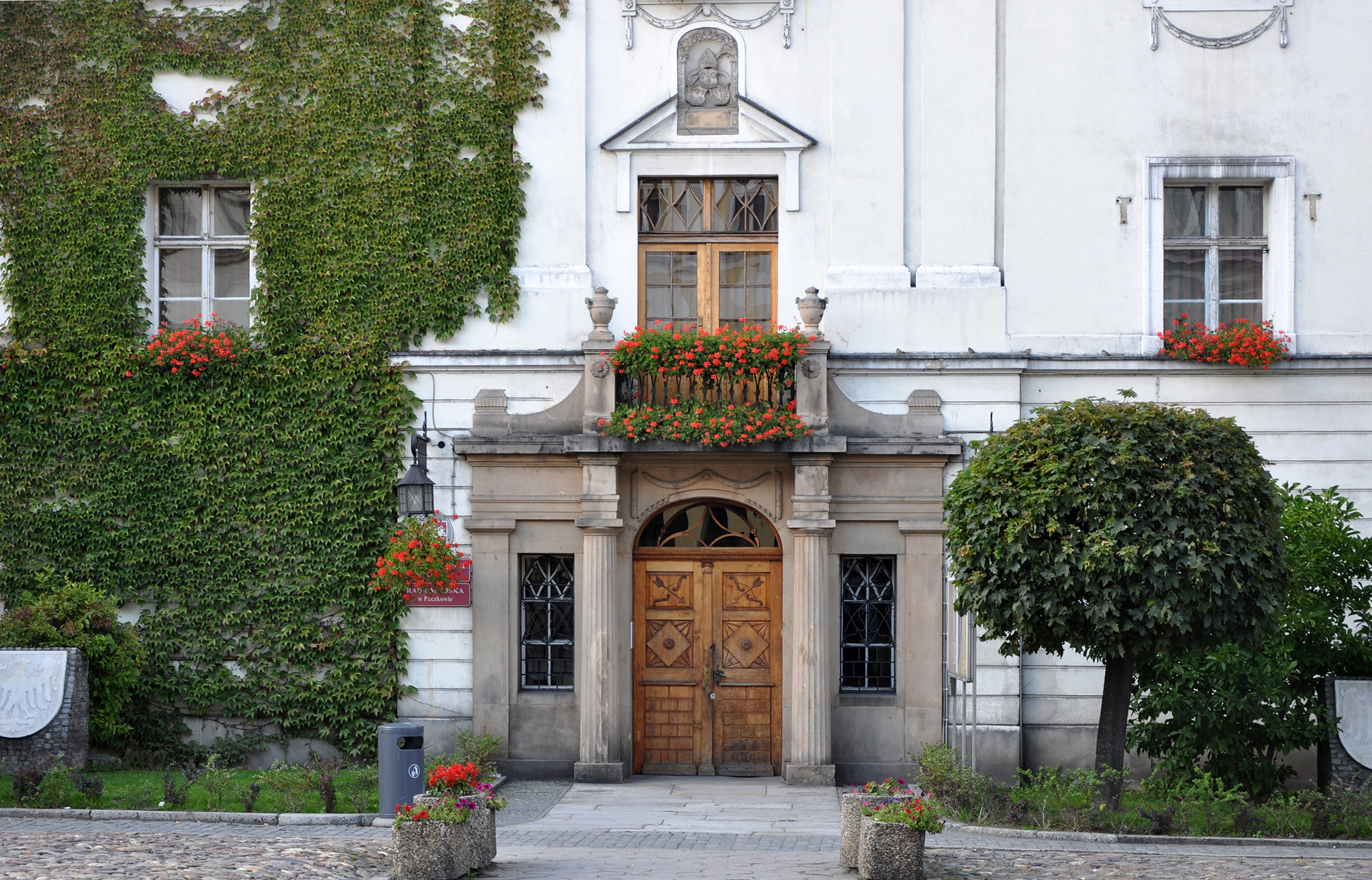

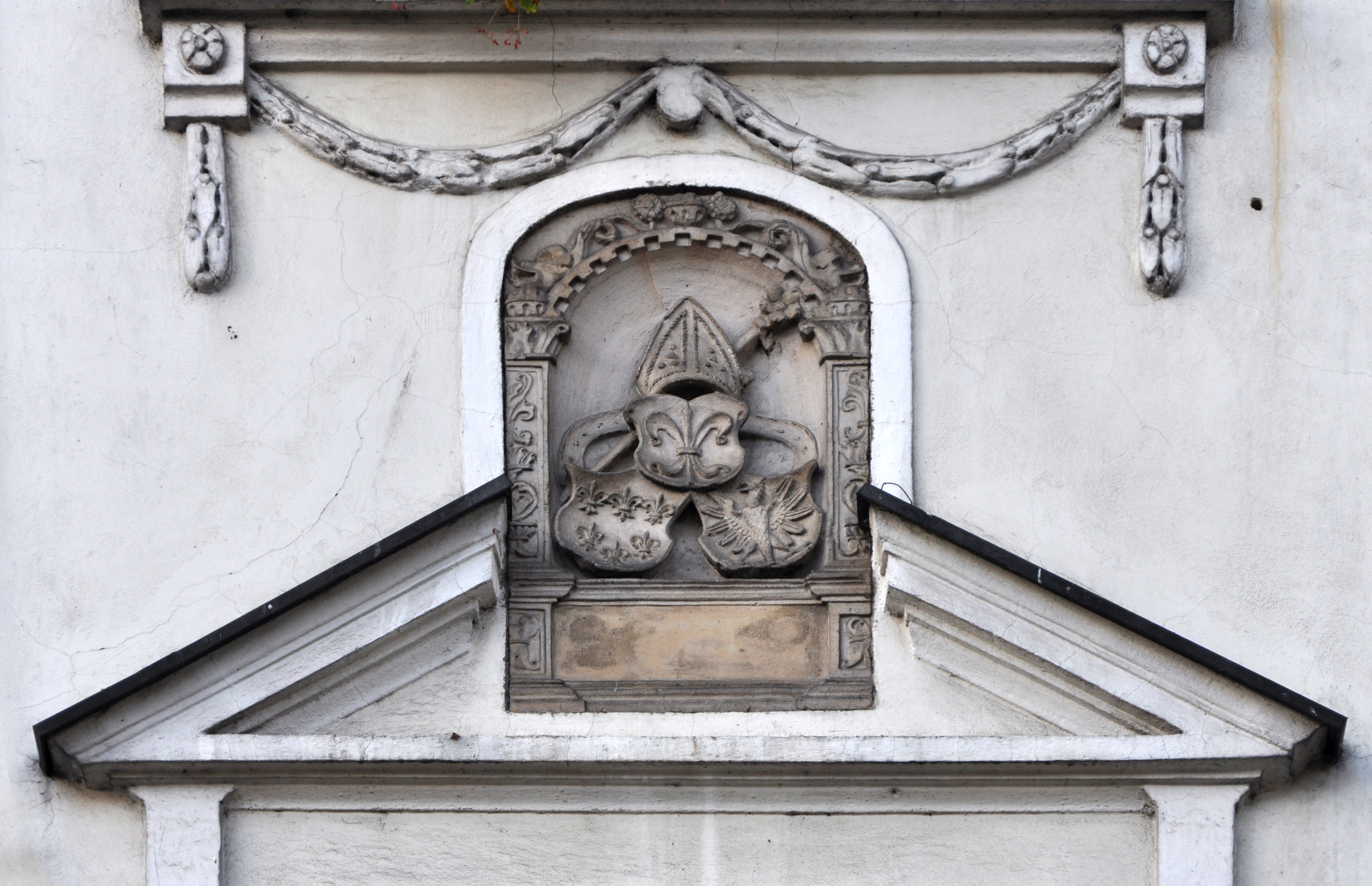

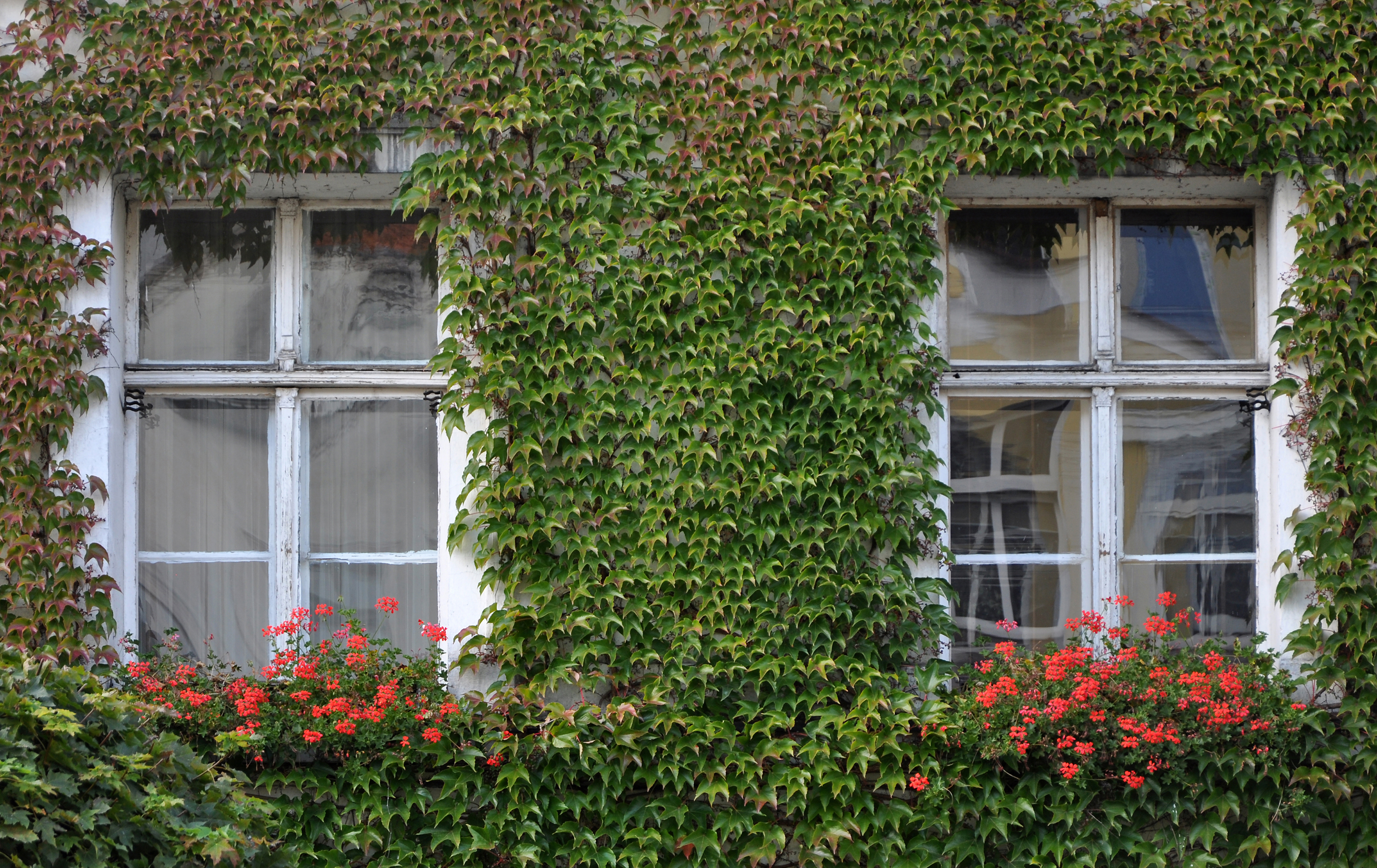
