= Zamboanga City Hall =

Government building of Zamboanga City, Philippines

- Bahay Pamahalaan ng Lungsod ng Zamboanga (Filipino)
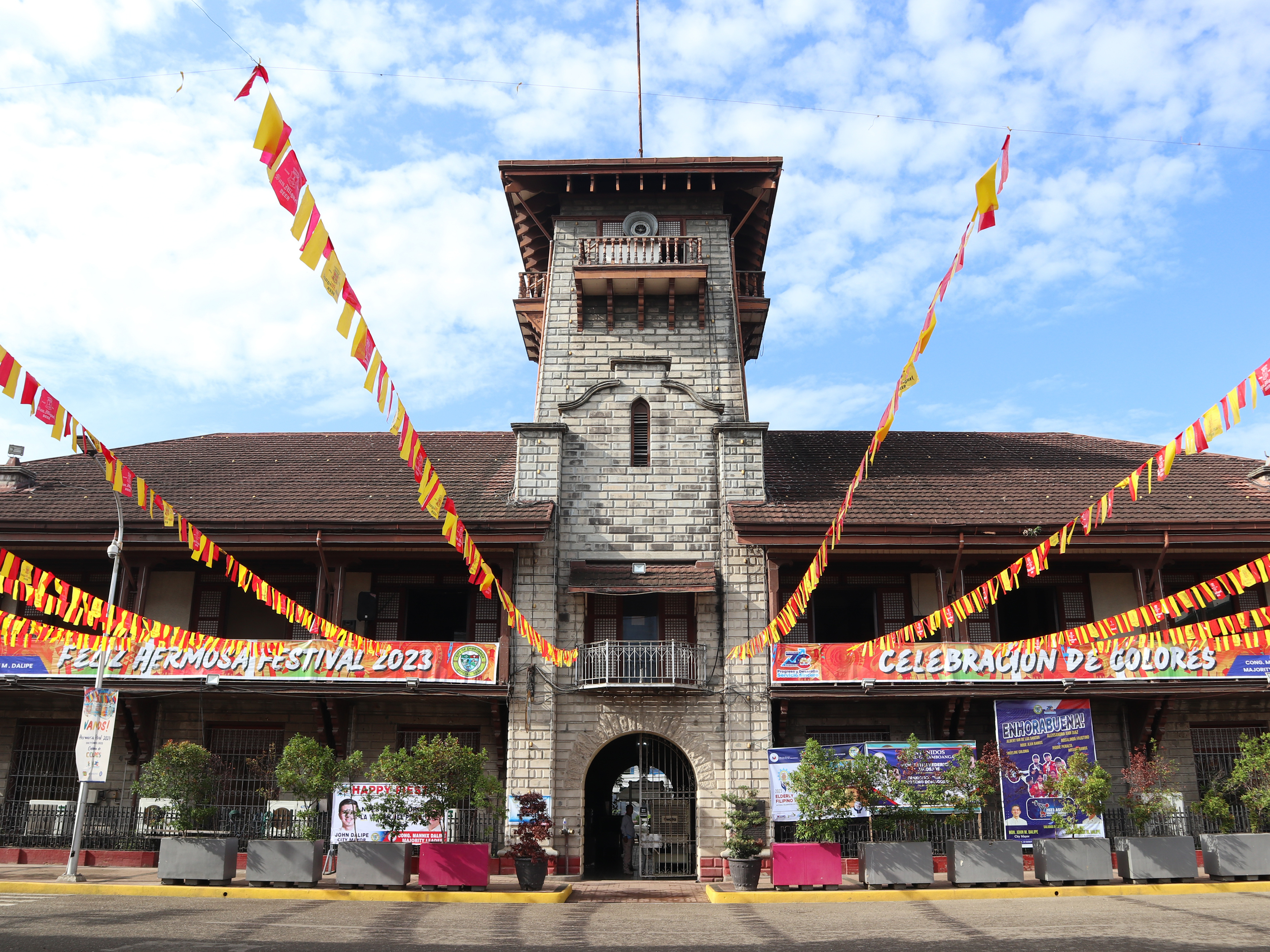
- Interactive map of the Zamboanga City Hall area

General information
- Status: Completed
- Location: Zamboanga City, Philippines
- Coordinates: 06°54′14.3″N 122°04′33.9″E
- Construction started: 1905
- Completed: 1907

The Zamboanga City Hall (Filipino: Bahay Pamahalaan ng Lungsod ng Zamboanga) is the seat of the local government of Zamboanga City. The National Historical Commission of the Philippines considers the city hall building as a National Historical Site.

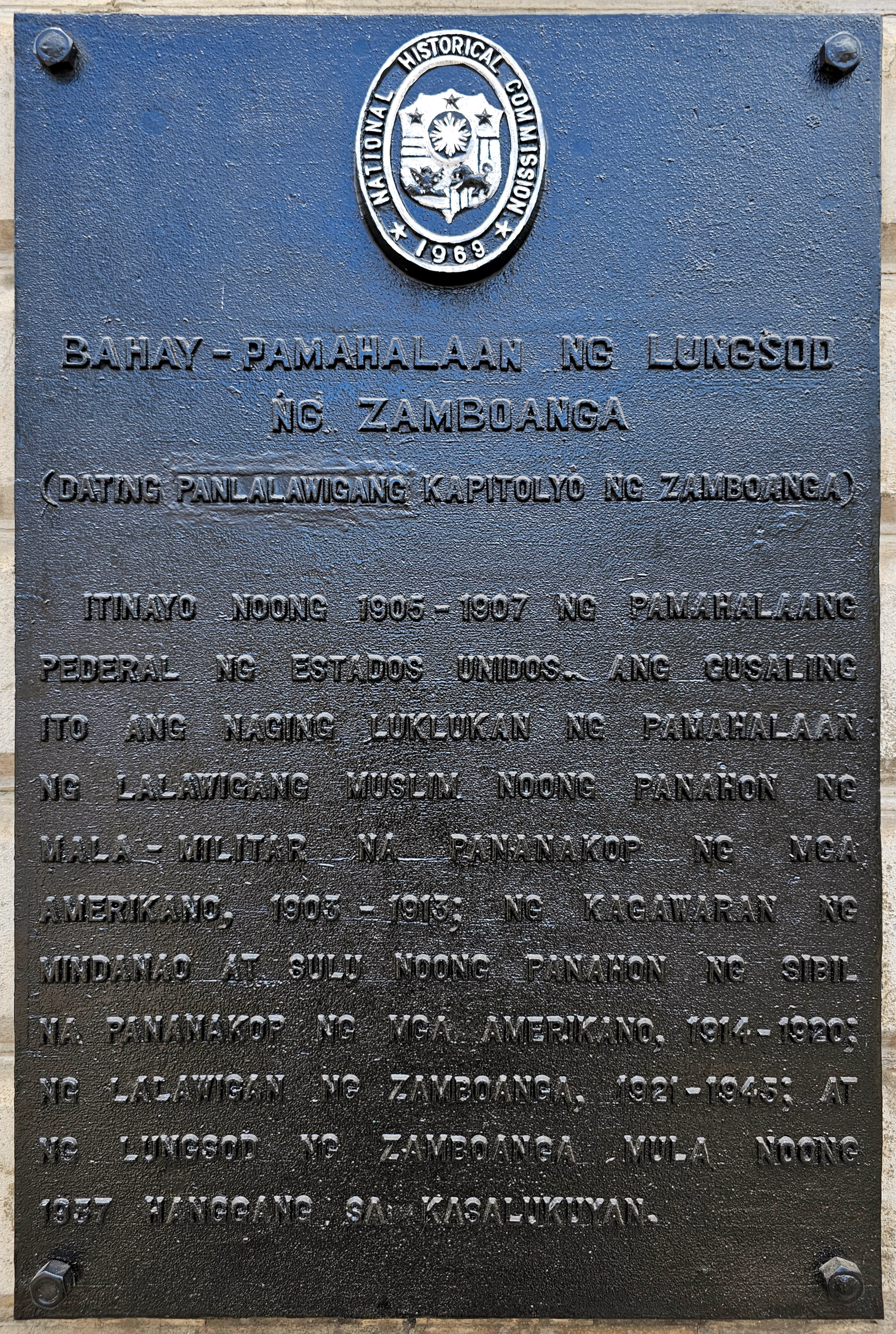
National historical marker installed in 1969

The construction of the historic building was commenced in 1905 by the federal government of the United States and was completed in 1907. The building served as the official residence of the US military governor of the Moro Province. It later became the seat of government of the Department of Mindanao and Sulu and the defunct Zamboanga province. Since 1937, the building has been functioning as the city hall of Zamboanga City. The Zamboanga City Hall has a Filipino colonial architectural design.

It is situated at one end of Plaza Rizal (Rizal Park).
