= Olesno Town Hall =

Coordinates: 50.8761°N 18.4222°E

Ratusz w Oleśnie (Olesno Town Hall)
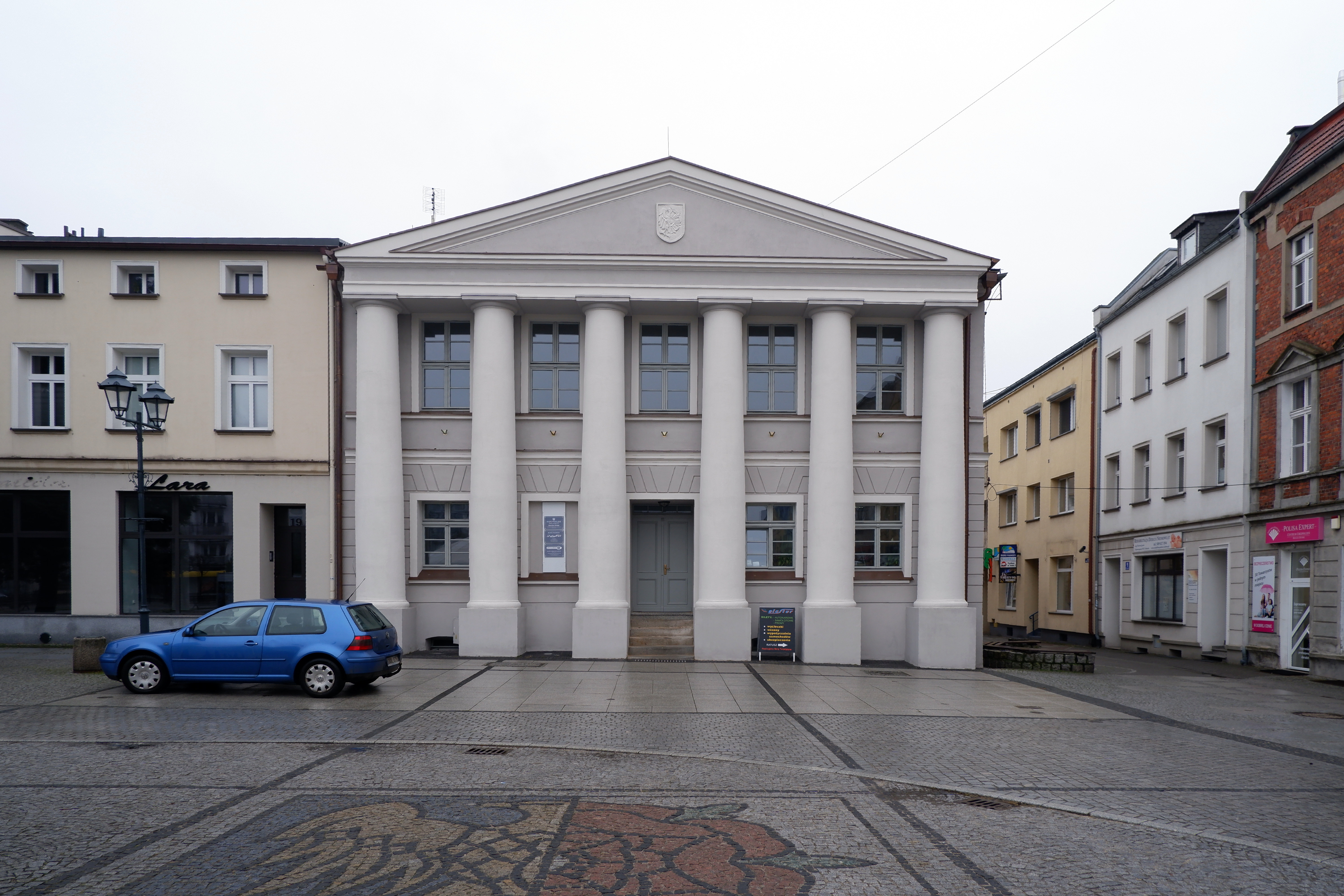
- Olesno Town Hall
- Interactive map of the Ratusz w Oleśnie (Olesno Town Hall) area

General information
- Type: Town hall
- Architectural style: Classicism
- Location: Olesno, Poland
- Construction started: 1820
- Completed: 1821

Olesno Town Hall - a Classical architectural style building built between 1820 and 1821, in the location of a former building from the seventeenth-century. The building was expanded in 1880, and in 1945 burnt down, and subsequently rebuilt after World War II. Currently, the office space in the town hall is rented.
