= Butuan City Hall complex =

Government building in Butuan, Philippines

Coordinates: 08°57′13.0″N 125°31′45.1″E

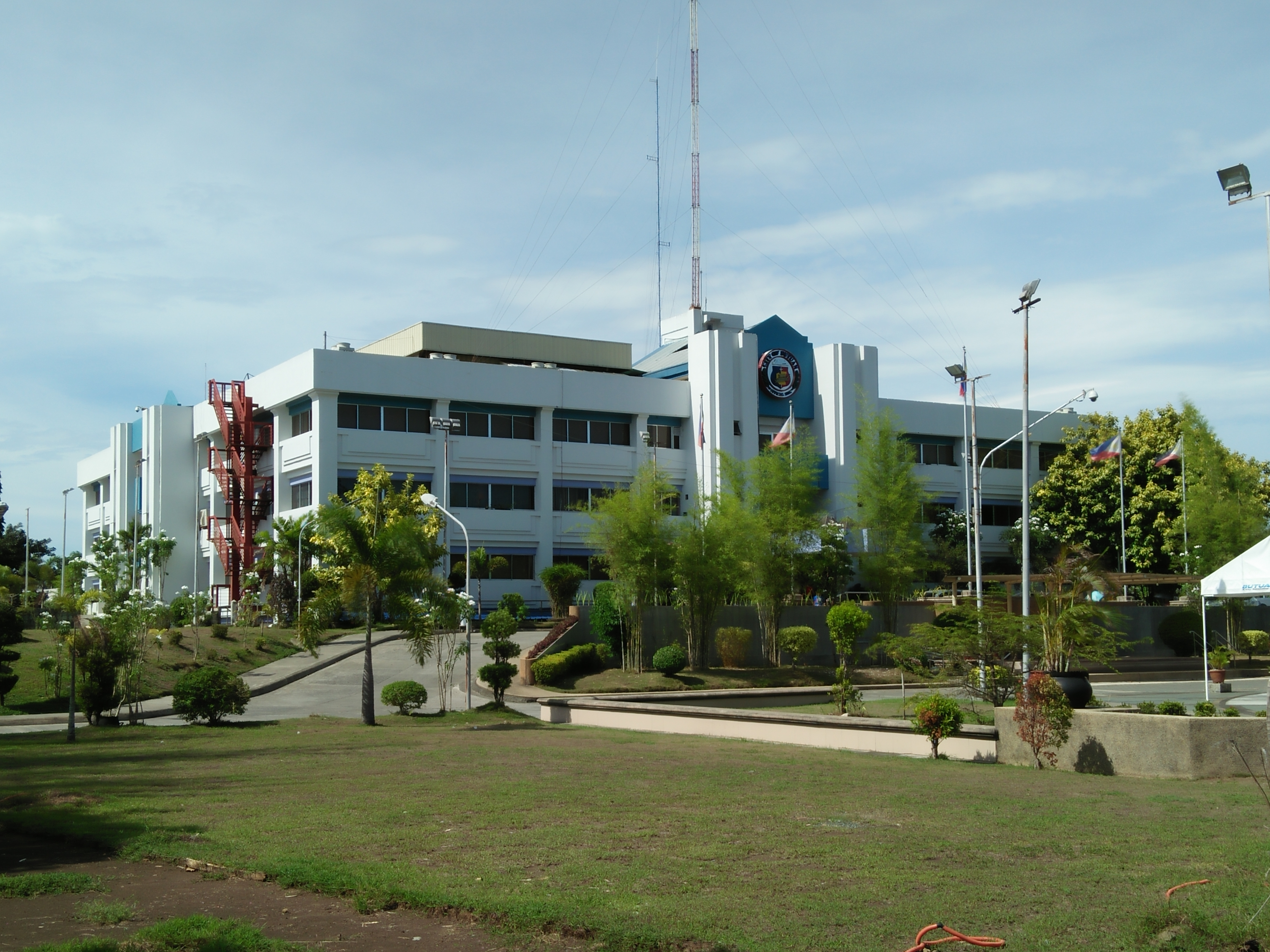
Butuan City hall as of 2018

The Butuan City Hall complex is the seat of the local government of the city of Butuan.

== History ==
The city hall began construction in the mid-1990s and was completed in 2003 under Mayor Democrito Plaza II. It was inaugurated on August 2, 2005, by Mayor Daisy Plaza. Shortly after city officials were transferred to the new building, the old building was razed. In 2009, Mayor Plaza II began construction of a new three-story councilor's building, but construction was halted due to a lack of funds. The councilor's building was finally completed in 2013 as a two-story building, and the rescue office was also opened. In 2014, a command center was added to the city hall.

== Facilities ==
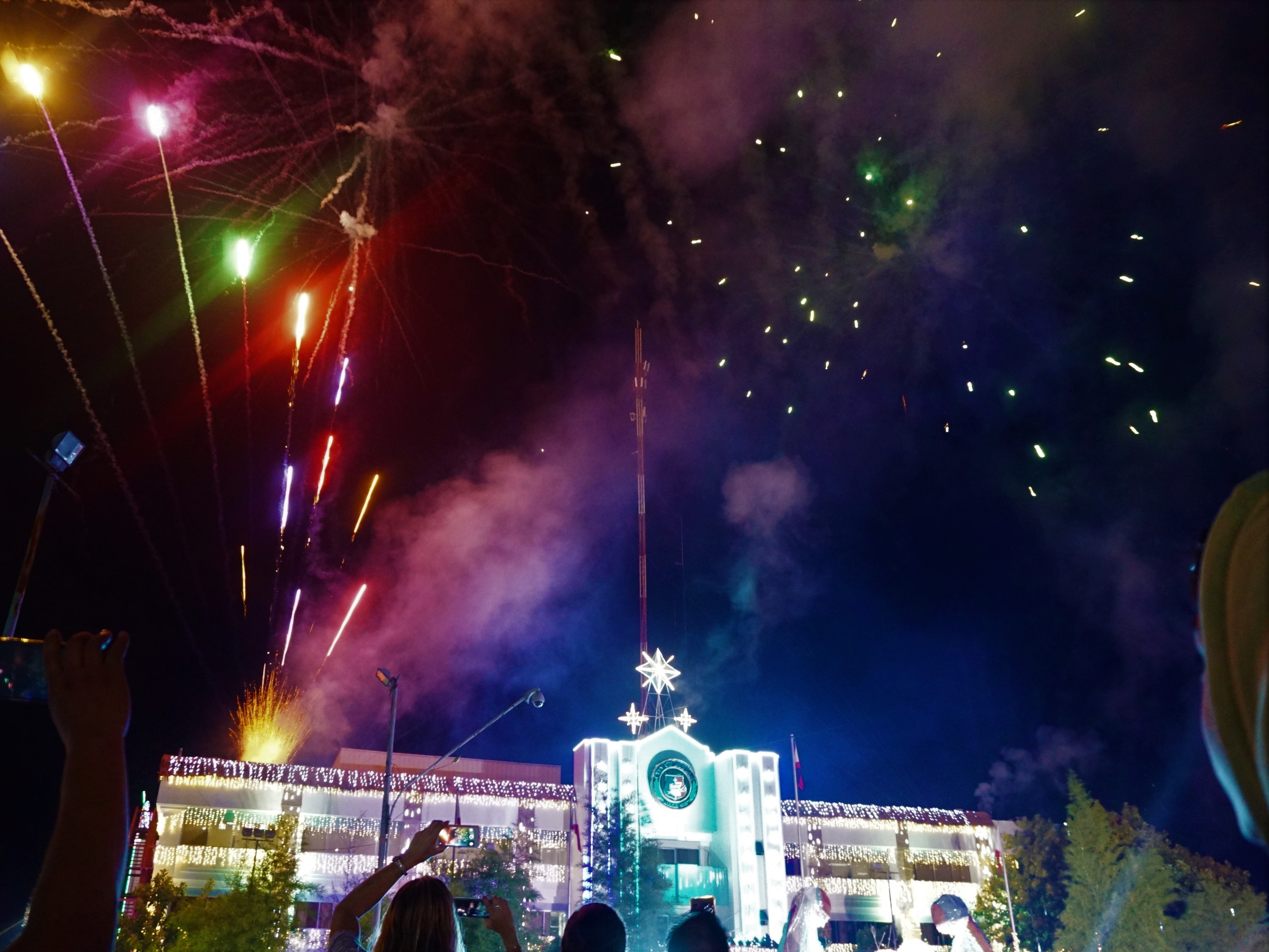
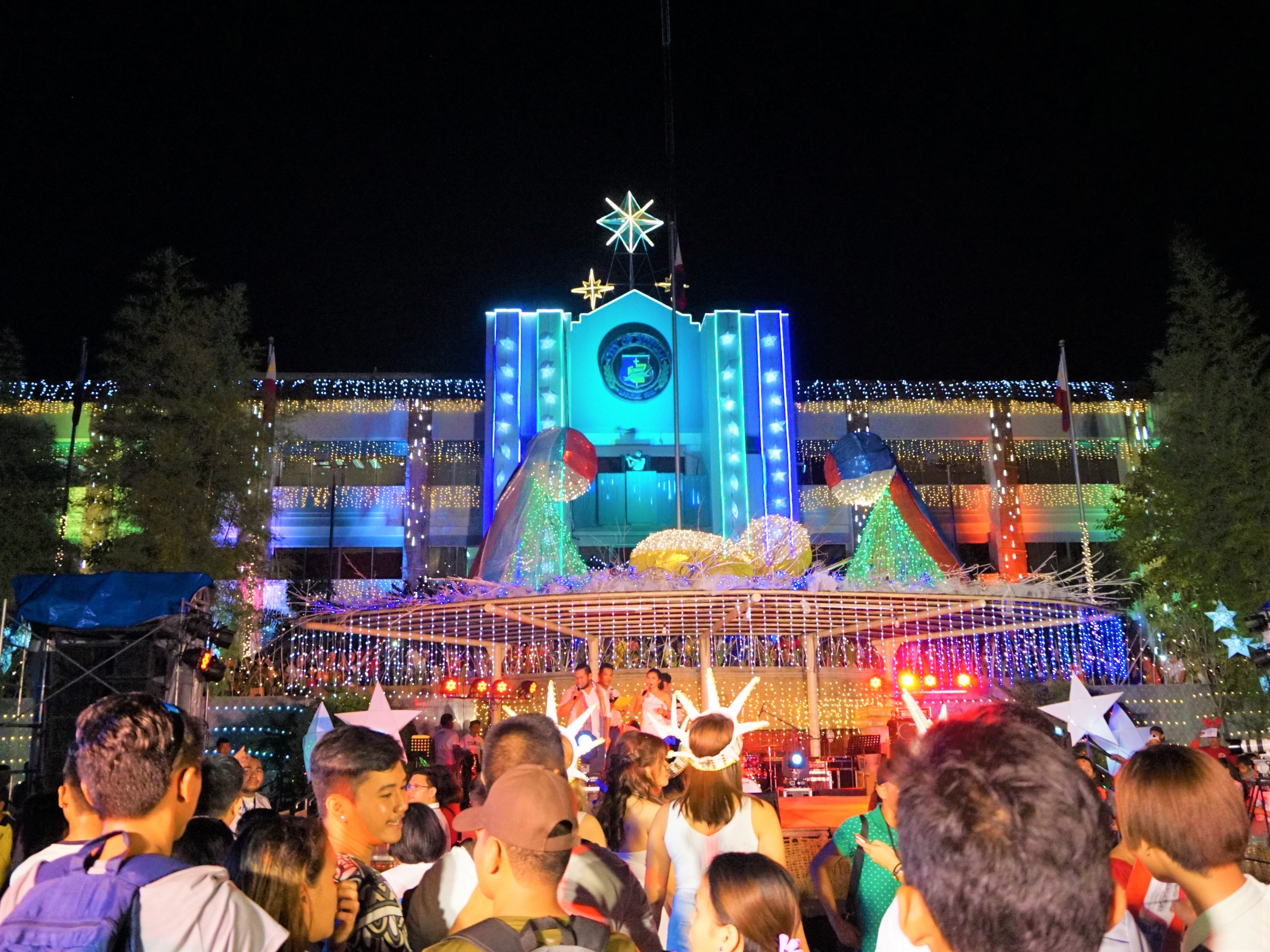
City Hall Complex at night during every month of December

=== City hall ===
- City engineering office
- Mayor's office
- Vice-Mayor's office
- City atrium
- Transparency Corner
- City Disaster risk Reduction Management office
- Philippine Charity Sweepstakes office – Butuan branch
- City Public Information Office

=== Councilor's building ===
- Interior and Local Government office – Butuan branch
- Function hall
- City Councilor's Office

=== Outside city hall ===
- Rajah Kolambu Monument (unfinished)
- Commission on Audit - Butuan office
- City Security office
- City Hall Park
- Radyo Pilipinas - Butuan Station

== See also ==
- Butuan
- List of Butuan city officials
