= City Hall and City Duma =

Planned city hall of Moscow

- Здание Правительства Москвы
- Interactive map of the City Hall and City Duma area

General information
- Status: Never built
- Location: Moscow-City, Moscow, Russia
- Coordinates: 55°45′4″N 37°32′28″E
- Construction started: 2006
- Estimated completion: Never
- Opening: Never

Height
- Roof: 308.4 m (1,011.8 ft)

Technical details
- Floor count: 71
- Floor area: 622,000 m^{2} (6,700,000 sq ft)

The City Hall and City Duma (Russian: Здание Правительства Москвы, romanized: Zdaniye Pravitel'stva Moskvy Lit. Moscow City Building) would have been the new home for the Moscow government and assembly (duma). It would have consisted of four 308.4 meter (1011.8 feet), 70 story towers. Currently, the government of the city are using hundreds of smaller buildings throughout the city. It was expected that most of the city's central administration will be gathered in the new complex to provide better organization, allowing the buildings currently in use to be sold.

The project consisted of four supertall skyscrapers with 20 one-storey bridges between towers and four eight-storey bridges at the top. The highest bridges would have been be built in shape of letter "M" for "Москва" (Moscow). The new buildings would have been located in the Moscow-City construction area, near Kutuzovskiy Prospect by the Moscow River. The project was cancelled because of the Great Recession.

== New Project ==
Hall Place in the "Moscow-City" will take a hotel and apartments At the site in the "Moscow City", where it was planned to build a complex of buildings for the executive and legislative branches of the capital, will build a multifunctional complex with a hotel and apartments. Lot was sold for 7.08 billion. IFC marginal area of 315.3 thousand square meters (250 000 "squares" should fall on the ground part of the complex). In the aerial parts of the hotel to be built on 1,300 rooms and apart-hotel with 300 rooms and located in the underground parking
