= 2024 Northern Beaches Council election =

- 14 September 2024

All 15 seats on Northern Beaches Council 8 seats needed for a majority
- Registered: 188,741
- Turnout: 82.73% (▼1.23)
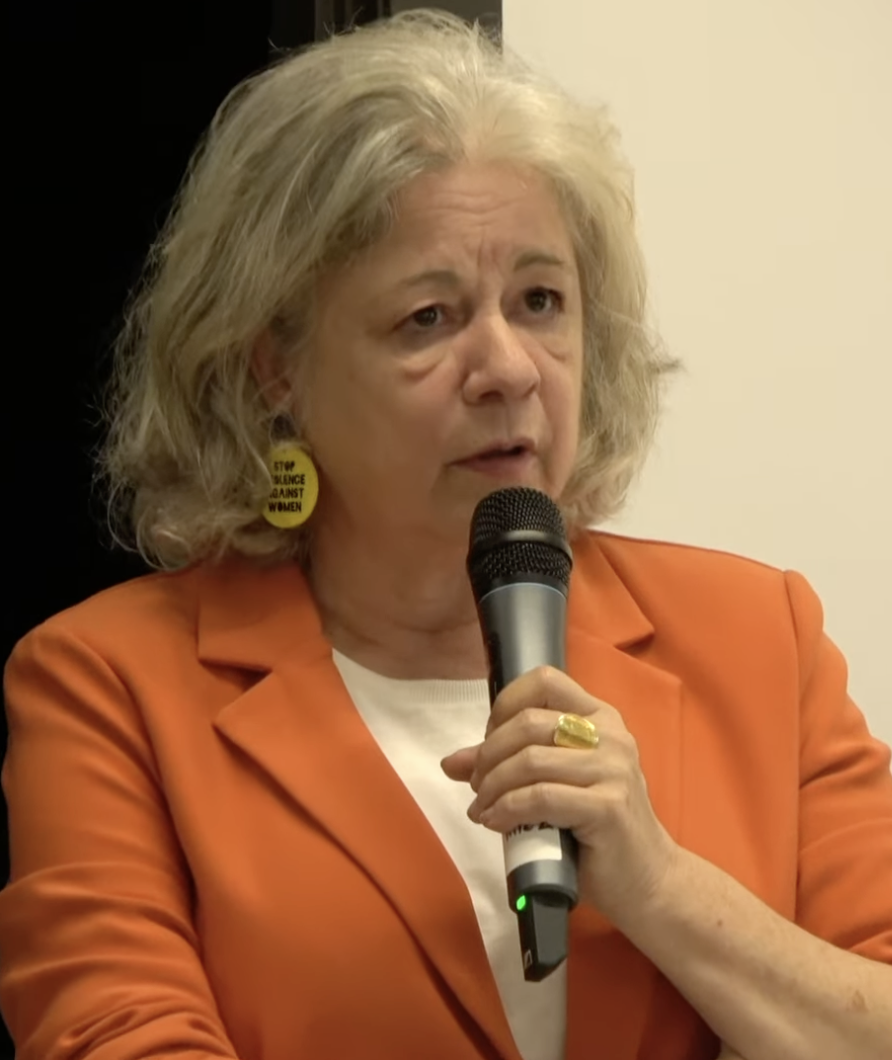

	First party	Second party	Third party
			TRUE
Leader	Sue Heins	None	Vincent De Luca
Party	YNBIT	Greens	True Independents
Leader's seat	Frenchs Forest	N/A	Narrabeen
Last election	6 seats	2 seats	1 seat
Seats before	5	2	1
Seats won	7	4	2
Seat change	▲2	▲2	▲1
Primary vote	71,095	27,052	15,814
Percentage	49.14%	18.70%	10.93%
Swing	▲18.04	▲3.70	▲7.51
- Results by ward

The 2024 Northern Beaches Council election was held on 14 September 2024 to elect 15 councillors to the Northern Beaches Council. The election was held as part of the statewide local government elections in New South Wales.

Your Northern Beaches Independent Team (YNBIT) won seven seats, one short of a majority, while the Greens doubled its seats to four. The Liberal Party lost all six seats it held prior to the election, owing to a missed candidate nomination deadline which prevented its councillors from recontesting, although one party member running without endorsement was elected.

== Background ==
Northern Beaches Council, located in the Northern Beaches region of Sydney, was established in 2016 and held its first election one year later. Your Northern Beaches Independent Team (YNBIT), established by former Warringah mayor Michael Regan, won six seats at the 2017 election and retained all six in 2021.

Regan was elected to the New South Wales Legislative Assembly as the member for Wakehurst at the 2023 state election. Following this, Curl Curl Ward councillor Sue Heins replaced Regan as YNBIT leader and Northern Beaches mayor on 16 May 2023. Liberal councillor Rory Amon was also elected to parliament as the member for Pittwater, with former Manly councillor Karina Page elected as his replacement following a countback on 20 June 2023.

On 28 January 2024, Pittwater Ward councillor Michael Gencher left YNBIT to join the Liberal Party. According to the Northern Beaches Advocate, Gencher was one of several YNBIT councillors facing "pressure to stand aside" in favour of candidates aligned with teal independents. Heins told the Manly Observer in response that "if Gencher needs more structure, then he has made the right move". As a result of Gencher's defection, YNBIT lost its plurality on council.

== Electoral system ==
Like in all other New South Wales local government areas (LGAs), Northern Beaches Council elections use optional preferential voting. Under this system, voters are only required to vote for one candidate or group, although they can choose to preference other candidates.

All elections for councillor positions are elected using proportional representation. Northern Beaches has an Australian Senate-style ballot paper with above-the-line and below-the-line voting. The council is divided into five wards, each electing three councillors.

The election was conducted by the New South Wales Electoral Commission (NSWEC).

== Retiring councillors ==
=== Your Northern Beaches ===
- Michael Regan (Frenchs Forest) – elected to parliament in 2023

=== Liberal ===
- Stuart Sprott (Frenchs Forest)

== Candidates ==
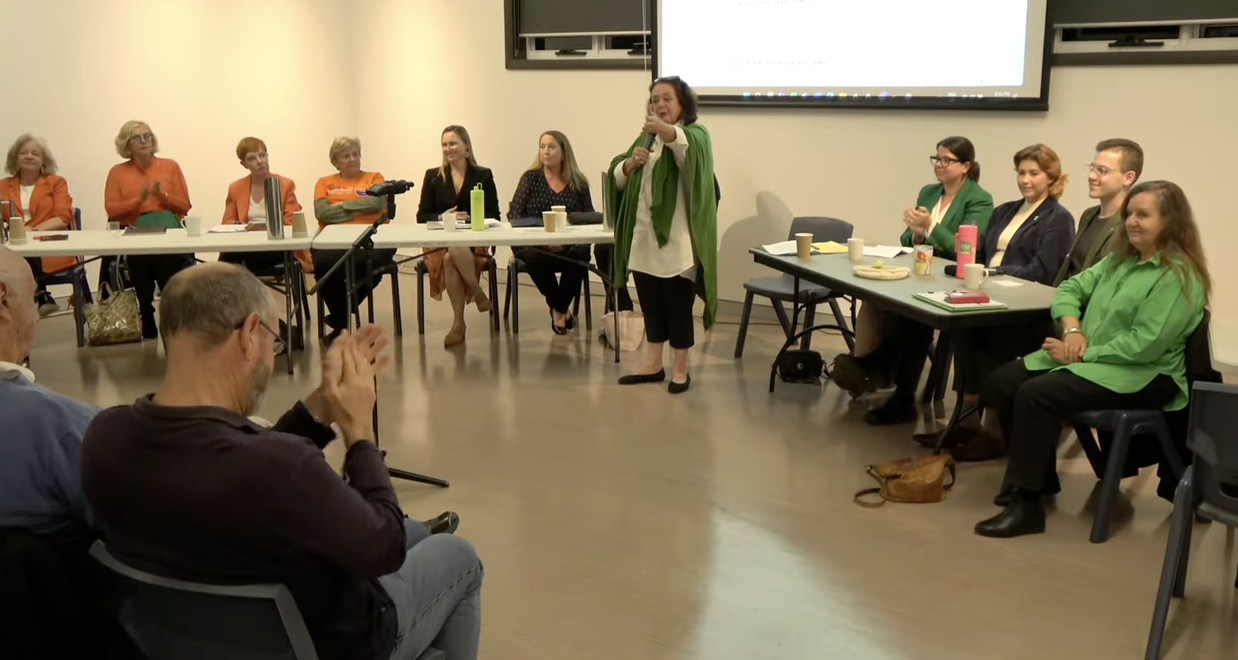
Your Northern Beaches, Labor and Greens candidates at a forum in August 2024.

On 14 August 2024, the day that candidates nominations closed, the Liberal Party revealed they had missed the deadline to nominate 164 candidates in 16 different LGAs. This included all Liberal councillors seeking re-election to Northern Beaches Council.

The only Liberal member to remain on the ballot was Mandeep Singh, who was supposed to run on the party's Pittwater Ward ticket with Gencher. Singh had mistakenly submitted his own nomination form, rather than waiting for the Liberals to do it on his behalf, meaning he appeared on the ballot as an ungrouped candidate.

YNBIT ran candidates in every ward, while the Greens contested four wards and the Labor Party contested three. Additionally, Manly Ward councillor Candy Bingham recontested with her "Good For Manly" registered party, and Narrabeen Ward councillor Vincent De Luca ran on the "True Independents" ticket.

=== Curl Curl ===
Your Northern Beaches (Group A)	Greens (Group B)	Labor (Group C)
1. Joeline Hackman; 2. Nicholas Beaugeard; 3. Nick McDonald	1. Kristyn Glanville; 2. Judy Lambert; 3. Roberto Suares	1. Jasper Thatcher; 2. Carolyn Howells

=== Frenchs Forest ===
Greens (Group A)	Your Northern Beaches (Group B)
1. Ethan Hrnjak; 2. Fathimath Ibrahim; 3. Cooper Holdsworth	1. Sue Heins; 2. Jody Williams; 3. Penny Philpott

=== Manly ===
Good For Manly (Group A)	Your Northern Beaches (Group B)	Labor (Group C)	Greens (Group D)
1. Candy Bingham; 2. Taylah Schrader; 3. Peter Greentree	1. Sarah Grattan; 2. Rachael Michael; 3. David Cowell	1. Brandt Clifford; 2. Celine Varghese-Fell; 3. Sam Pigram	1. Bonnie Harvey; 2. Pamela Dawes; 3. Terry Le Roux

=== Narrabeen ===
True Independents (Group A)	Labor (Group B)	Your Northern Beaches (Group C)
1. Vincent De Luca; 2. Robert Giltinan; 3. Tammy Cook	1. Sue Wright; 2. Ryan O'Sullivan	1. Ruth Robins; 2. Chris Jackson; 3. Adam Hughes

=== Pittwater ===
Greens (Group A)	Your Northern Beaches (Group B)	Ungrouped
1. Miranda Korzy; 2. Evan Turner-Schiller; 3. Felicity Davis	1. Rowie Dillon; 2. Judy Charnaud; 3. Ian White	Mandeep Singh (Ind Lib); Philip Walker (FOMV)

=== Withdrawn candidates ===
Party	Candidate	Ward	Details
Liberal	David Walton	Curl Curl	Incumbent councillor unable to recontest because of missed candidacy deadline.
Liberal	Georgia Prassopoulos	Curl Curl	Candidate unable to contest because of missed nomination deadline.
Liberal	Georgia Ryburn	Manly	Incumbent councillor unable to recontest because of missed nomination deadline.
Liberal	Adele Heasman	Manly	Candidate unable to contest because of missed nomination deadline.
Liberal	Amanda Wilmot	Manly	Candidate unable to contest because of missed nomination deadline.
Liberal	Bianca Crvelin	Narrabeen	Incumbent councillor unable to recontest because of missed nomination deadline.
Liberal	Michael Gencher	Pittwater	Incumbent councillor unable to recontest because of missed nomination deadline.
Liberal	Karina Page	Pittwater	Incumbent councillor unable to recontest because of missed nomination deadline.

== Campaign ==
Although he was the only Liberal member contesting the election, Singh was not permitted to use official party material during the campaign. Singh was also endorsed by Liberal MP and former councillor Rory Amon, prior to Amon being charged with child sex offences and resigning from parliament on 30 August 2024.

== Results ==
=== Ward results ===
2024 Northern Beaches Council election: Ward results
Party	Votes	%	Swing	Seats	Change
Your Northern Beaches	71,095	49.14	+18.04	7	▲1
Greens	27,052	18.70	+3.70	4	▲2
True Independents	15,814	10.93	+7.51	2	▲1
Independent Liberal	10,710	7.40	−27.70 (Note: Compared with the Liberal Party in 2021.)	1	▼4
Good For Manly	10,230	7.07	+2.67	1	Steady
Labor	9,387	6.49	−0.01	0	Steady
Friends of Mona Vale	387	0.26	+0.26	0	Steady
Formal votes	144,675	92.66			
Informal votes	11,472	7.34			
Total	156,147	100.0		15	
Registered voters / turnout	188,741	82.73	−1.23		

=== Curl Curl ===
2024 Northern Beaches Council election: Curl Curl Ward
Party	Candidate	Votes	%	±%
Your Northern Beaches	1. Joeline Hackman (elected 1); 2. Nicholas Beaugeard (elected 2); 3. Nick McDonald	18,885	65.8	+21.2
Greens	1. Kristyn Glanville (elected 3); 2. Judy Lambert; 3. Roberto Suares	6,992	24.4	+8.5
Labor	1. Jasper Thatcher; 2. Carolyn Howells	2,814	9.8	−4.8
Total formal votes		28,691	91.8	−4.8
Informal votes		2,551	8.2	+4.8
Turnout		31,242	80.2	+1.5

=== Frenchs Forest ===
2024 Northern Beaches Council election: Frenchs Forest Ward
Party	Candidate	Votes	%	±%
Your Northern Beaches	1. Sue Heins (elected 1); 2. Jody Williams (elected 3); 3. Penny Philpott	21,898	73.5	+28.8
Greens	1. Ethan Hrnjak (elected 2); 2. Fathimath Ibrahim; 3. Cooper Holdsworth	7,892	26.5	+12.8
Total formal votes		29,790	92.0	−4.9
Informal votes		2,604	8.0	+4.9
Turnout		32,394	86.8	−0.8

=== Manly ===
2024 Northern Beaches Council election: Manly Ward
Party	Candidate	Votes	%	±%
Your Northern Beaches	1. Sarah Grattan (elected 2); 2. Rachael Michael; 3. David Cowell	10,381	36.5	+13.0
Good For Manly	1. Candy Bingham (elected 1); 2. Taylah Schrader; 3. Peter Greentree	10,230	35.9	+13.0
Greens	1. Bonnie Harvey (elected 3); 2. Pamela Dawes; 3. Terry Le Roux	4,831	17.0	+4.8
Labor	1. Brandt Clifford; 2. Celine Varghese-Fell; 3. Sam Pigram	3,033	10.6	+2.3
Total formal votes		28,475	94.7	−2.7
Informal votes		1,592	5.3	+2.7
Turnout		30,067	80.2	−1.8

=== Narrabeen ===
2024 Northern Beaches Council election: Narrabeen Ward
Party	Candidate	Votes	%	±%
True Independents	1. Vincent De Luca (elected 1); 2. Robert Giltinan (elected 3); 3. Tammy Cook	15,814	54.4	+37.5
Your Northern Beaches	1. Ruth Robins (elected 2); 2. Chris Jackson; 3. Adam Hughes	9,710	33.4	+4.6
Labor	1. Sue Wright; 2. Ryan O'Sullivan	3,540	12.2	+3.4
Total formal votes		29,064	91.0	−5.2
Informal votes		2,890	9.0	+5.2
Turnout		31,954	84.5	−0.7

=== Pittwater ===
2024 Northern Beaches Council election: Pittwater Ward
Party	Candidate	Votes	%	±%
Independent Liberal	Mandeep Singh (elected 1)	10,710	37.4	−4.7
Your Northern Beaches	1. Rowie Dillon (elected 2); 2. Judy Charnaud; 3. Ian White	10,221	35.7	+12.5
Greens	1. Miranda Korzy (elected 3); 2. Evan Turner-Schiller; 3. Felicity Davis	7,337	25.6	+5.0
Friends of Mona Vale	Philip Walker	387	1.3	+1.3
Total formal votes		28,655	94.0	−2.8
Informal votes		1,835	6.0	+2.8
Turnout		30,490	82.1	−1.4

== Aftermath ==
Singh resigned from the Liberal Party on 8 April 2025 to contest the Division of Mackellar as an independent at the 2025 federal election. He received 0.63% of the vote, finishing last in a field of nine candidates.
