= Manly Cove Pavilion =

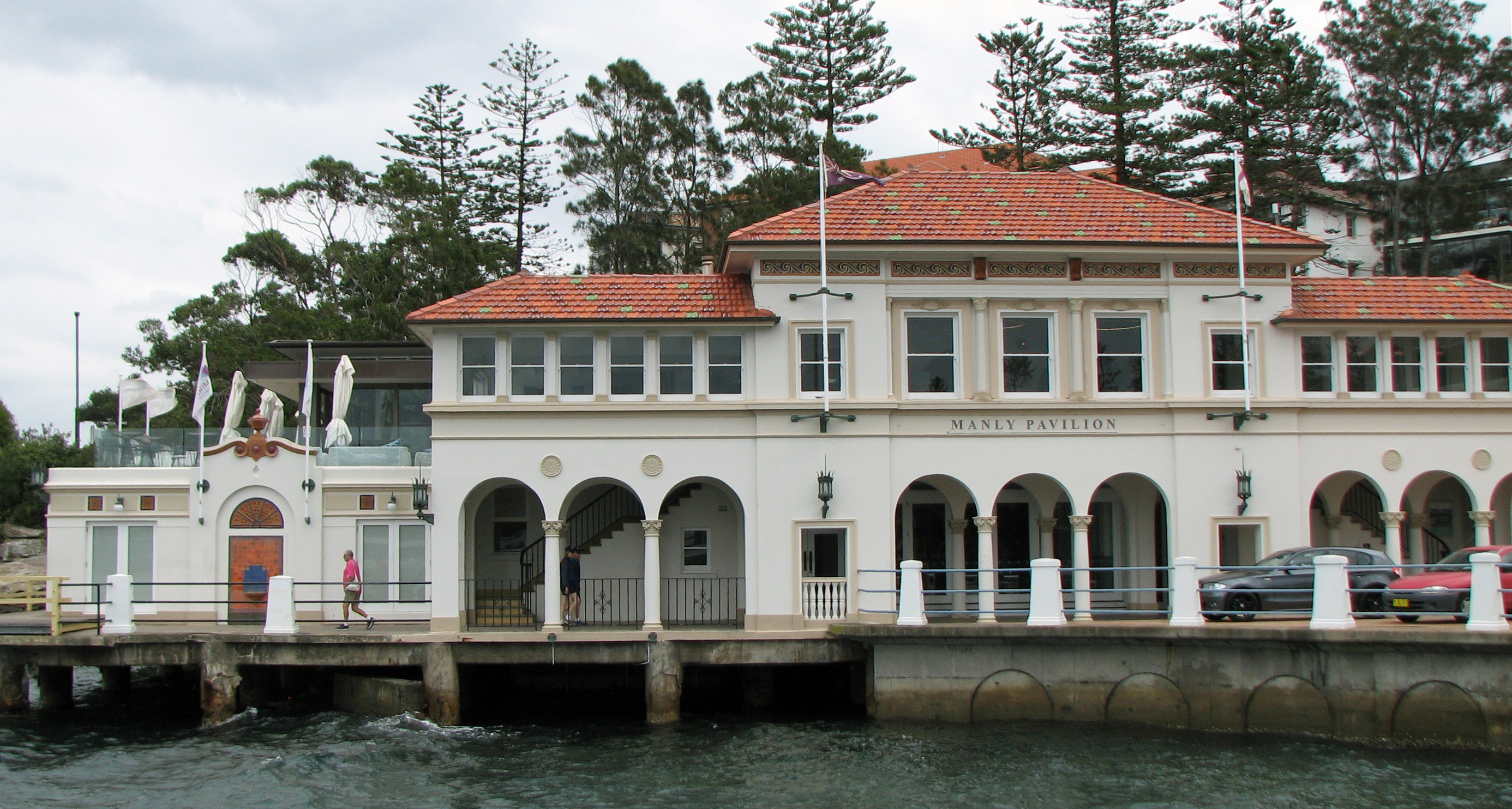
- Manly Cove Pavilion

- Location within NE Sydney
- 33°47′57″S 151°16′51″E
- Location: West Esplanade, Manly, Northern Beaches Council, New South Wales, Australia

Site notes
- Owner: Roads & Maritime Services

New South Wales Heritage Register
- Official name: Manly Cove Pavilion
- Type: State heritage (built)
- Designated: 18 April 2000
- Reference no.: 1433
- Type: Restaurant (food outlet)
- Category: Recreation and Entertainment

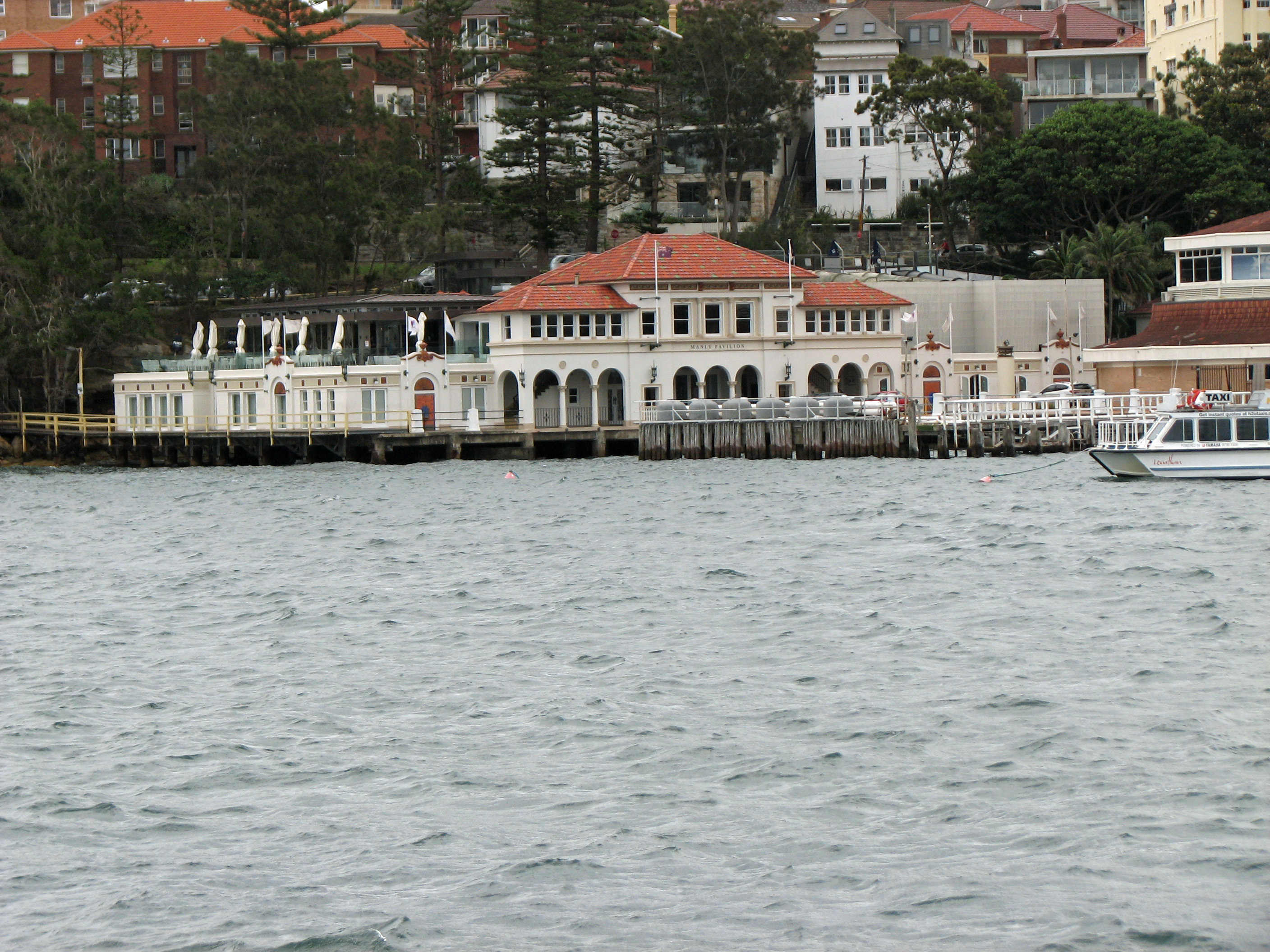
Manly Cove Pavilion, Manly New South Wales, from the sea.

The Manly Cove Pavilion is a heritage-listed former dressing pavilion and amenities block and now public amenities and restaurant at West Esplanade, Manly, Northern Beaches Council, New South Wales, Australia. The property is owned by Roads & Maritime Services, an agency of the Government of New South Wales. It was added to the New South Wales State Heritage Register on 18 April 2000.

== History ==
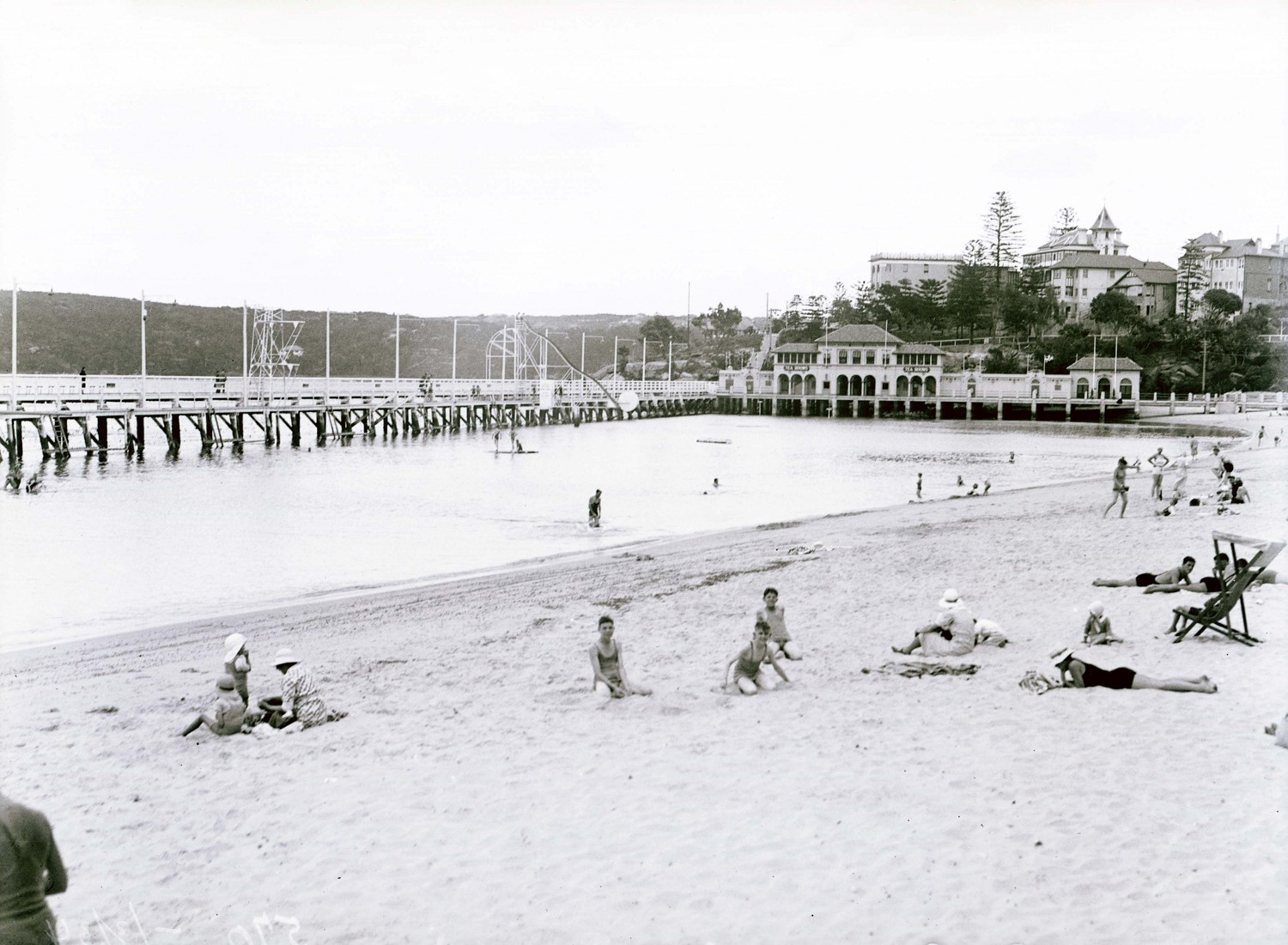
Historic image of the pavilion

Built during the interwar period when Manly was a favourite and fashionable seaside resort.

Sequential development (where known): Parts of Wheeler (1842) and Johnston (1842) grants, erected c. 1933 by Port Jackson and Manly Steamship Company.

== Description ==
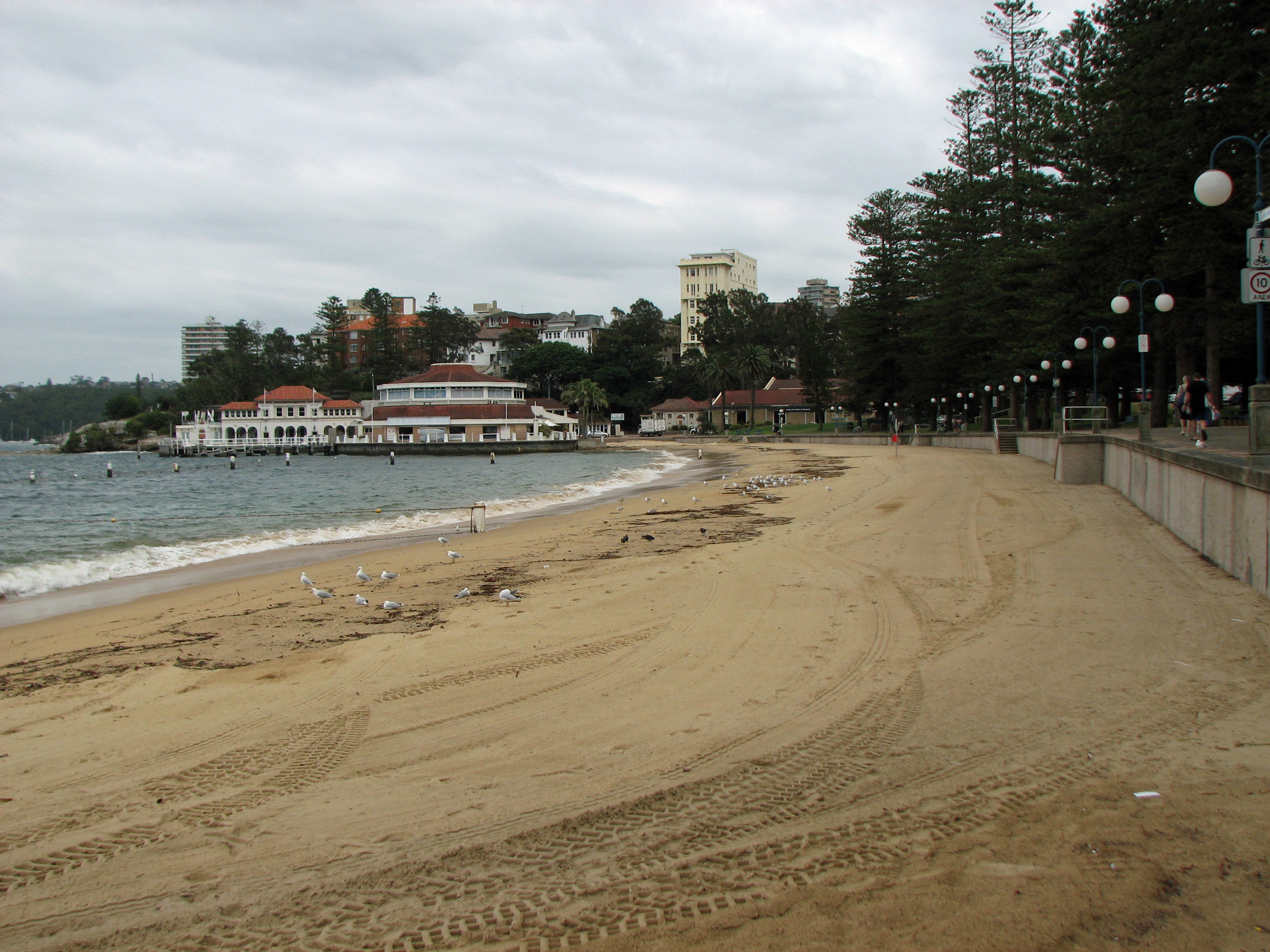
Manly Cove Pavilion, Manly New South Wales, facing west

Largely intact exterior retaining the ambience of the interwar Mediterranean style; white painted rendered brick, decorative ceramic tile insets and arched colonnade.

Ferro-concrete two storey tiled roof pavilion built on pier. Colonnade to ground floor. Capitals to columns have fish, shell and acanthus leaf decoration; original wrought iron balustrading between columns beside water.

Pavilion walls have decorative tile inlays using burnt orange and ultramarine ceramic tiles. A Greek key motif pattern is surmounted by semi- circular tiles which is in turn surmounted by ceramic decoration in scrolls and by urns.

There is a strong Spanish influence throughout. The toilet block is of the same period. Special elements include the tile inlay bearing the letter "M", the floral motif in cornice decoration, original tiling to walls and the timber pagoda-style entry.

=== Condition ===
As at 15 June 1998, it was in a good condition. Largely intact exterior retaining the ambience of the interwar Mediterranean style.

Largely intact exterior.

=== Modifications and dates ===
The original pavilion has undergone interior refurbishment c. 1980 - restaurant fitout.

== Heritage listing ==
As at 12 June 1998, it was one of the few remaining harbour pavilion structures of this period and style in Sydney.

Manly Cove Pavilion was listed on the New South Wales State Heritage Register on 18 April 2000 having satisfied the following criteria.

The place is important in demonstrating the course, or pattern, of cultural or natural history in New South Wales.

For its associations with the early 20th century developments of the Manly seaside resort.

The sandstone pillar is a relic from past maritime activity and is evidence of Sydney Harbour's nautical development and early evidence of interest in retaining and re-using old buildings.

The place is important in demonstrating aesthetic characteristics and/or a high degree of creative or technical achievement in New South Wales.

As an intact example of the interwar Mediterranean style.

The place is important in demonstrating the principal characteristics of a class of cultural or natural places/environments in New South Wales.

One of few remaining harbour pavilion structures of this period and style in Sydney.

== See also ==
- Australian non-residential architectural styles
