= Manly Substation =

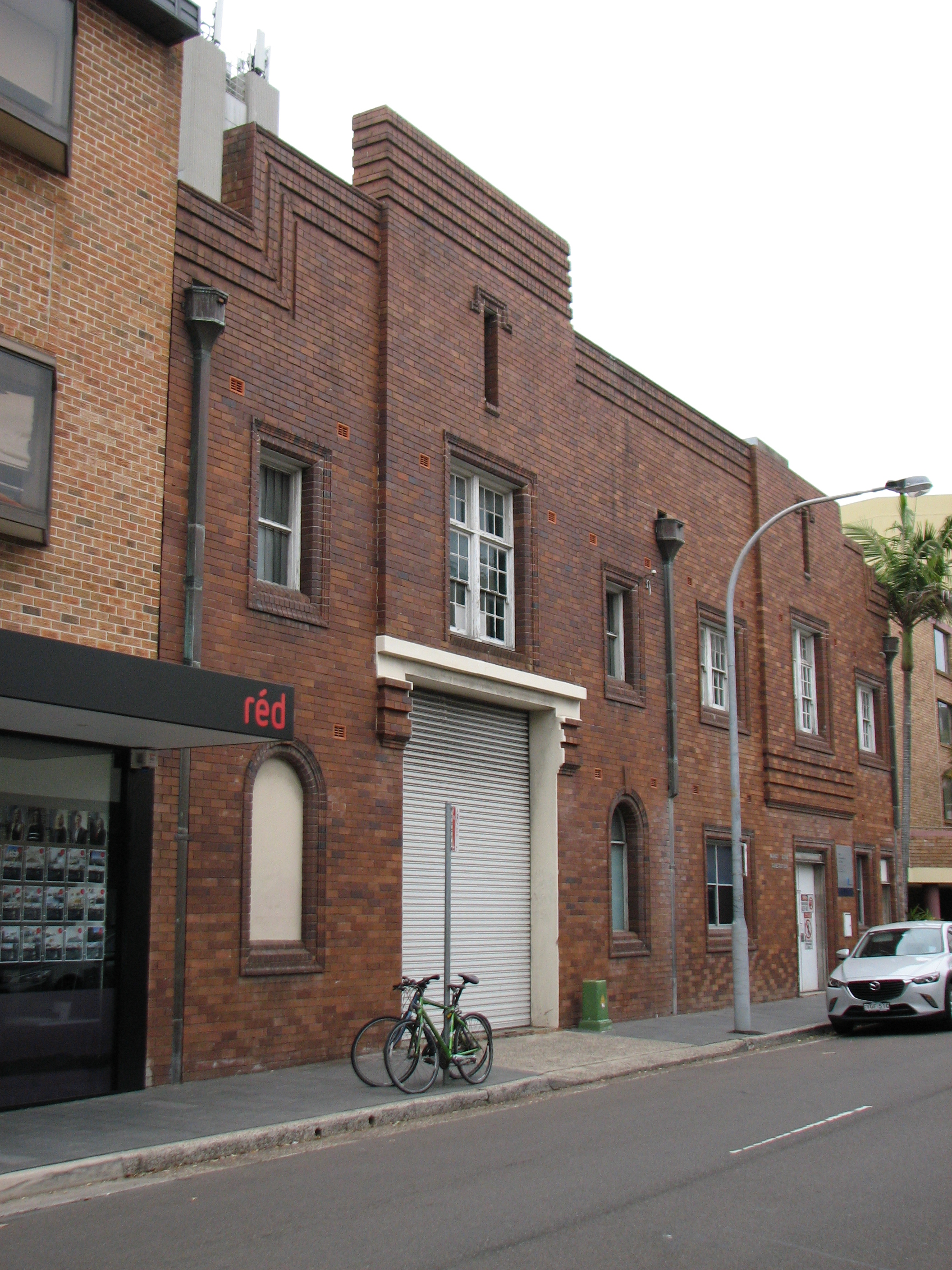
- Manly Substation, 34a-36 Whistler Street, Manly, New South Wales

- Location within New South Wales Location within Australia
- 33°47′46″S 151°17′10″E
- Location: 34a-36 Whistler Street, Manly, Northern Beaches Council, New South Wales, Australia

History
- Built: 1945

Site notes
- Architectural style: Inter-war Art Deco
- Owner: Ausgrid

New South Wales Heritage Register
- Official name: Substation; #15009 Manly 33 kV Zone/Residential Unit
- Type: State heritage (built)
- Designated: 2 April 1999
- Reference no.: 938
- Type: Electricity Transformer/Substation
- Category: Utilities - Electricity

The Manly Substation is a heritage-listed electrical substation located at 34a-36 Whistler Street, Manly, Northern Beaches Council, New South Wales, Australia. It was built in 1945. It is also known as #15009 Manly 33 kV Zone/Residential Unit. The property is owned by Ausgrid, a privately owned energy utility company. The substation was added to the New South Wales State Heritage Register on 2 April 1999.

== History ==
The Manly Zone substation is a purpose designed and built structure constructed c. 1945. "MANLY ZONE SUBSTATION" appears on the façade in metal lettering. The Residential Unit no 34a is located within the same building. Its property number is 7007. Historical period: 1926–1950.

== Description ==
The Manly Zone substation is a fine and robust, well detailed face brick two storey building built on the street alignment. Stylistic elements of Inter-war Art Deco include the extensive use of face brick and brick detailing in the stepped parapet and base of the projecting first floor oriel windows and the use of bold linear motifs. Decorative elements include the use of curved bricks to form unusual framing around windows and doorways. The building incorporates a residential unit titled #15101 RESIDENTIAL UNIT, 34a Whistler Street. The Manly Zone substation is constructed in load-bearing face brick with cement render applied to the plant doorway reveals. Original windows are double hung timber multi pane. Exterior materials used include face brick, timber joinery, and steel roller shutter.

=== Condition ===
As at 8 November 2000, the condition of the substation was good.

=== Modifications and dates ===
Aluminium windows and doors installed at ground level.

== Heritage listing ==
As at 8 November 2000, the Manly Zone substation was a fine and robust, well detailed face brick purpose designed and built structure. It is an excellent and externally intact representative example of the Interwar Art Deco style. It is considered to be a rare example of this style and of State Significance.

Substation was listed on the New South Wales State Heritage Register on 2 April 1999.

== See also ==
- Australian non-residential architectural styles
