= Northern Beaches Council =

Local government area in New South Wales, Australia

- Local government area
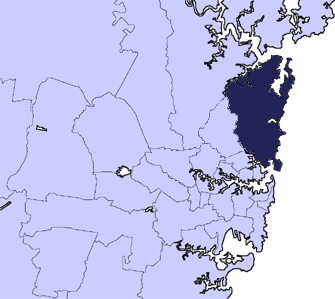
- Location in Metropolitan Sydney

- Interactive map of Northern Beaches Council
- Coordinates: 33°45′S 151°17′E
- Country: Australia
- State: New South Wales
- Region: Metropolitan Sydney
- Established: 12 May 2016
- Council seat: Dee Why

Government
  - Mayor: Sue Heins
  - State electorates: Davidson; Manly; Pittwater; Wakehurst
  - Federal divisions: Mackellar; Warringah

Area
  - Total: 254 km^{2} (98 sq mi)

Population
  - Total: 263,554 (2021 census) (11th (Australia); 4th (NSW))
  - Density: 1,037.6/km^{2} (2,687/sq mi)
- Website: Northern Beaches Council
LGAs around Northern Beaches Council
Hornsby	Broken Bay	Pacific Ocean
Ku-ring-gai & Willoughby	Northern Beaches Council	Pacific Ocean
Mosman	Sydney Harbour	Pacific Ocean

The Northern Beaches Council is a local government area located in the Northern Beaches region of Sydney, in the state of New South Wales, Australia. The council was formed on 12 May 2016 after the amalgamation of Manly, Pittwater, and Warringah councils.

The Council comprises an area of 254 square kilometres (98 sq mi) and as at the 2021 census had an estimated population of 263,554, making it the fourth-most populous local government area in New South Wales.

The Mayor of the Northern Beaches Council is Cr. Sue Heins, of the Your Northern Beaches Independent Team, since 16 May 2023.

== History ==
Warringah Shire Hall in 1954 with the Mackellar County Council offices to the left.

=== Early history ===
The traditional Aboriginal inhabitants of the land now known as the Northern Beaches were among the estimated two dozen clans around Sydney Harbour of the Dharug language group. These included the Kayamaygal and the Birrabirragal around what is now Manly to the Garigal further north and around Pittwater, peoples of the Eora nation. Within a few years of European colonisation, between 60 and 90 percent of the Indigenous peoples around Port Jackson succumbed to the deadly smallpox contagion of 1789. Much evidence of their habitation remains, especially their rock etchings in Ku-ring-gai Chase National Park which borders northern beaches' north-western side.

The northern beaches region was explored early on in the settlement of Sydney, only a few weeks after the arrival of the First Fleet. However, it remained a rural area for most of the 19th and early 20th centuries, with only small settlements in the valleys between headlands. While it was geographically close to the city centre, to reach the area over land from Sydney via Mona Vale Road was a trip of more than 100 kilometres (62 mi).

=== Local government history ===
The Municipality of Manly was first incorporated on 6 January 1877, being the first local government authority on the Northern Beaches. On 7 March 1906, the Warringah Shire was proclaimed by the NSW Government Gazette, along with 132 other new Shires. It ran roughly from Broken Bay in the north to Manly Lagoon to the south, and by Middle Harbour Creek and Cowan Creek in the west. It covered 264 square kilometres (102 sq mi) and had a population of around 2800, with 700 dwellings. From 1951 to 1980, the Mackellar County Council operated on the Northern Beaches as an electricity and gas supplier and retailer as a joint operation of Manly Municipal Council and Warringah Shire Council. Amalgamation of Manly and Warringah councils to form one council for the Northern Beaches was recommended in the final report of the 1945–46 Clancy Royal Commission on Local Government Boundaries, but was not proceeded with in the act passed in 1948.

On 2 May 1992, The Governor of New South Wales proclaimed the establishment of the Municipality of Pittwater, the area of which roughly followed the area formerly known as 'A' Riding of the Warringah Shire. On 1 July 1993, with the enactment of a new Local Government Act 1993, the municipalities of Manly and Pittwater were renamed "Manly Council" and "Pittwater Council" and Warringah Shire Council became "Warringah Council".

=== Establishment of Northern Beaches Council ===
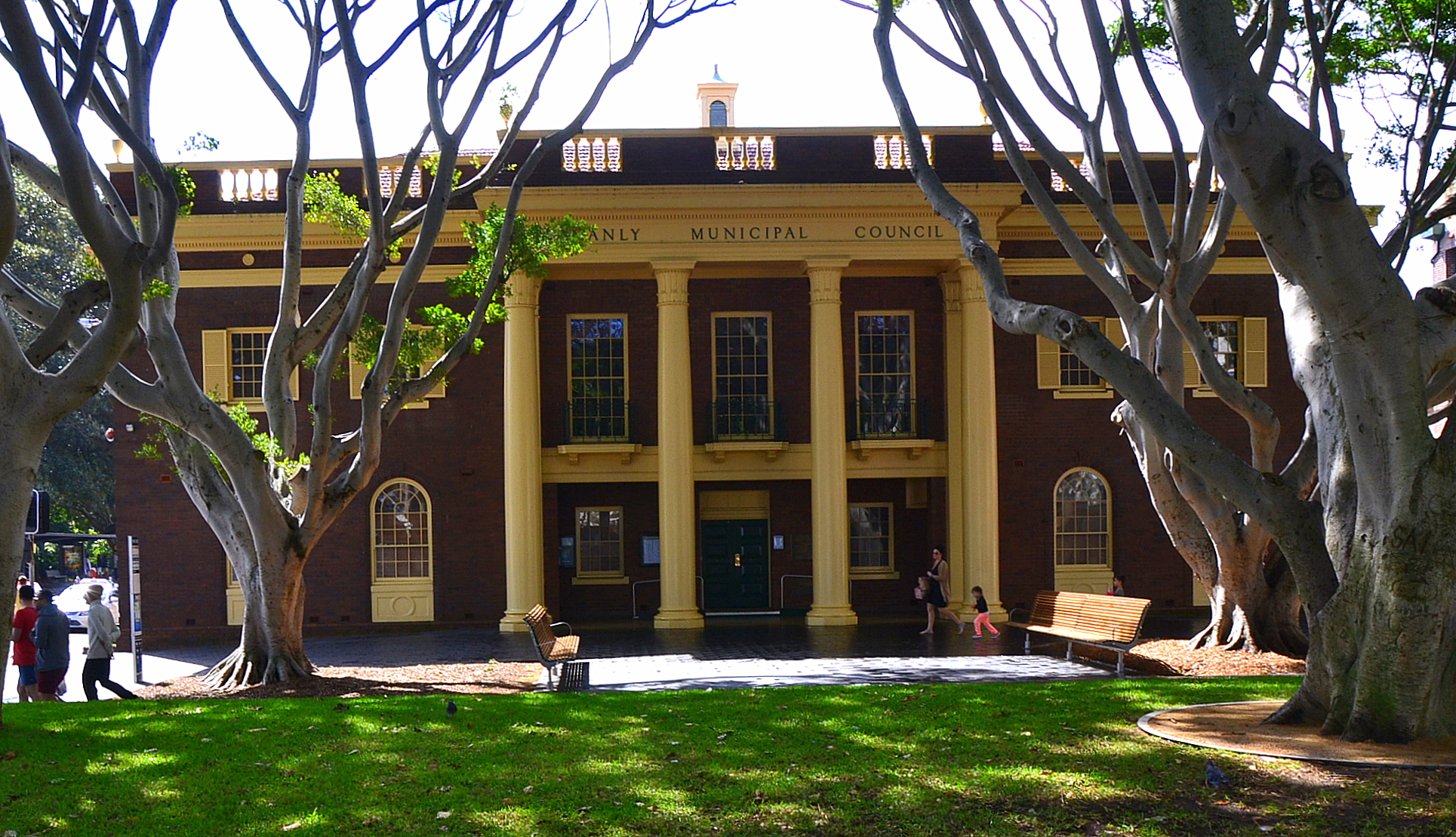
Manly Town Hall, the site of the first meeting of the new council on 19 May 2016.

In 2015 a review of local government boundaries by the NSW Government Independent Pricing and Regulatory Tribunal recommended that Manly, Pittwater and Warringah merge to form one single council. The government eventually considered three proposals. The first proposed a merger of Manly and Mosman councils and parts of Warringah to form a new council with an area of 49 square kilometres (19 sq mi) and support a population of approximately 153,000. The second proposed a merger of Pittwater Council and parts of Warringah to form a new council with an area of 214 square kilometres (83 sq mi) and support a population of approximately 141,000.

The third proposal, submitted by Warringah Council on 23 February 2016, was for an amalgamation of the Pittwater, Manly and Warringah councils. Of the 44,919 submissions lodged to the Boundaries Commission about all the local government proposals statewide, 29,189 were from Northern Beaches residents (18,977 were submitted for the third proposal); this meant that the Northern Beaches proposals made up 65% of all submissions. Former Warringah mayor, Michael Regan, noted to the Manly Daily that this was an indication of the level of interest in the Northern Beaches over the future of their local government: "Given the choice of splitting the Northern Beaches or uniting it, the community opted for unity.", while former Manly mayor, Jean Hay, commented that this interest translated into the final result: "Everyone is passionate about the area and we came out and let the powers-that-be know, [...] It must have made an impact because the minister and the premier looked at what the community told them and it was the majority decision to go with a single council."

On 12 May 2016, with the release of the Local Government (Council Amalgamations) Proclamation 2016, the Northern Beaches Council was formed from Manly, Pittwater and Warringah councils. The first meeting of the Northern Beaches Council was held at Manly Town Hall on 19 May 2016. Several advisory committees were established at the council's first meeting to advise the administrator and the council on implementation matters, composed of former councillors and mayors of the three councils. These included Manly Mayor Jean Hay as Chair of the Implementation Advisory Group and Chair of the Social Committee, Warringah Mayor Michael Regan as Chair of the Economic Committee and Pittwater Deputy Mayor Kylie Ferguson as Chair of the Environment Committee. The first Council election was held on 9 September 2017, with Regan was elected as the first Mayor on 26 September 2017.

In October 2022, Northern Beaches Council was awarded the A. R. Bluett Memorial Award by Local Government NSW, which recognises the best-performing councils in the state in the previous year, with the mayor Michael Regan noting: "Since amalgamation we have had a huge focus on repairing and renewing ailing infrastructure, delivering long term financial stability and putting the community at the centre of everything we do. It hasn't been easy but this award recognises the hard work and dedication of both the elected Council and our incredible staff to deliver great outcomes for our community." The chair of the award trustees, Les McMahon, also noted that the Council had "led its community through a number of challenges including the ongoing COVID-19 pandemic and unprecedented wet weather events. Despite the challenges, Northern Beaches Council was still able to deliver a $76 million capital works program, with a focus on resilient and sustainable infrastructure, while also undertaking a comprehensive community services program to assist all members of its community".

== Council ==
The head of the Northern Beaches Council from the proclamation was Administrator Dick Persson AM, who remained in office until the election of the new mayor on 26 September 2017. The first meeting of the Northern Beaches Council was held at Manly Town Hall on 19 May 2016 and from then until September 2017, the monthly council meetings cycled between the three former council chambers: Mona Vale Memorial Hall, Warringah Civic Centre in Dee Why and Manly Town Hall. Since September 2017, council meetings are held at the Civic Centre in Dee Why.

=== Officeholders ===
Mayor	Term	Notes
Dick Persson (Administrator)	12 May 2016 – 26 September 2017	Administrator of Warringah 2003–2008, Port Macquarie-Hastings 2008–2009 and Central Coast Council 2020-2021
Michael Regan (YNB)	26 September 2017 – 16 May 2023	Mayor of Warringah 2008–2016
Sue Heins (YNB)	16 May 2023 – present	
Deputy Mayor	Term	Notes
Candy Bingham (GfM)	26 September 2017 – 25 September 2018	Manly Councillor 2012–2016.
Sue Heins (YNB)	25 September 2018 – 24 September 2019	
Candy Bingham (GfM)	24 September 2019 – 27 September 2022	
Sue Heins (YNB)	27 September 2022 – 16 May 2023	
David Walton (LIB)	23 May 2023 – 26 September 2023	
Georgia Ryburn (LIB)	26 September 2023 – present	
Chief Executive Officer	Term	Notes
Mark Ferguson	12 May 2016 – 6 March 2018	General Manager of Pittwater 2006–2016 and Coffs Harbour 1998–2005
Ray Brownlee PSM	1 October 2018 – 29 March 2023	General Manager of the City of Randwick 2004–2018
Louise Kerr (interim)	29 March 2023 – 24 July 2023	
Scott Phillips	24 July 2023 – present	CEO of Local Government NSW 2020–present; General Manager of Sutherland Shire (2015–2018) and Hornsby Shire (2011–2015).

=== Current composition ===
Results of the 2024 Northern Beaches Council per ward.

The Northern Beaches Council comprises fifteen Councillors elected proportionally, with three Councillors elected in five wards. The Mayor is elected biennially by the councillors at the first meeting. The Deputy Mayor is elected annually. The most recent election was held on 14 September 2024 for a fixed four-year term of office, and the makeup of the council by order of election is as follows:

Party	Councillors
Your Northern Beaches Independent Team	7
The Greens	4
Independent	2
Liberal Party of Australia	1
Good for Manly	1
Total	15

Ward	Councillor	Party	Notes
Curl Curl Ward	Joeline Hackman	Your Northern Beaches	Elected 2024
Curl Curl Ward	Nicholas Beaugeard	Your Northern Beaches	Elected 2024
Curl Curl Ward	Kristyn Glanville	Greens	Elected 2021
Frenchs Forest Ward	Ethan Hrnjak	Greens	Elected 2024
Frenchs Forest Ward	Sue Heins	Your Northern Beaches	Elected 2017; Mayor 2023–present; Deputy Mayor 2018–2019, 2022–2023.
Frenchs Forest Ward	Jody Williams	Your Northern Beaches	Elected 2024
Manly Ward	Candy Bingham	Good for Manly	Elected 2017; Deputy Mayor 2017–2018, 2019–2022.
Manly Ward	Sarah Grattan	Your Northern Beaches	Elected 2017
Manly Ward	Bonnie Harvey	Greens	Elected 2024
Narrabeen Ward	Vincent De Luca OAM	Independent	Elected 2017
Narrabeen Ward	Ruth Robins	Your Northern Beaches	Elected 2021
Narrabeen Ward	Robert Giltinan	Independent	Elected 2024
Pittwater Ward	Rowie Dillon	Your Northern Beaches	Elected 2024
Pittwater Ward	Mandeep Singh	Liberal	Elected 2024
Pittwater Ward	Miranda Korzy	Greens	Elected 2021

== Election results ==
=== 2024 ===
2024 Northern Beaches Council election: Ward results
Party	Votes	%	Swing	Seats	Change
Your Northern Beaches	71,095	49.14	+18.04	7	▲1
Greens	27,052	18.70	+3.70	4	▲2
True Independents	15,814	10.93	+7.51	2	▲1
Independent Liberal	10,710	7.40	−27.70 (Note: Compared with the Liberal Party in 2021.)	1	▼4
Good For Manly	10,230	7.07	+2.67	1	Steady
Labor	9,387	6.49	−0.01	0	Steady
Friends of Mona Vale	387	0.26	+0.26	0	Steady
Formal votes	144,675	92.66			
Informal votes	11,472	7.34			
Total	156,147	100.0		15	
Registered voters / turnout	188,741	82.73	−1.23		

== Past councillors ==
=== Curl Curl Ward ===
Year	Councillor	Party	Councillor	Party	Councillor	Party
2017	Michael Regan	Your Northern Beaches	David Walton	Liberal	Natalie Warren	Greens
2021	Sue Heins	Your Northern Beaches	David Walton	Liberal	Kristyn Glanville	Greens

=== Frenchs Forest Ward ===
Year	Councillor	Party	Councillor	Party	Councillor	Party
2017	Roslyn Harrison	Your Northern Beaches	Penny Philpott	Your Northern Beaches	Stuart Sprott	Liberal
2021	Michael Regan	Your Northern Beaches	Jose Menano-Pires	Your Northern Beaches	Stuart Sprott	Liberal

=== Manly Ward ===
Year	Councillor	Party	Councillor	Party	Councillor	Party
2017	Sarah Grattan	Your Northern Beaches	Pat Daley	Liberal	Candy Bingham	Good For Manly
2021	Sarah Grattan	Your Northern Beaches	Georgia Ryburn	Liberal	Candy Bingham	Good For Manly

=== Narrabeen Ward ===
Year	Councillor	Party	Councillor	Party	Councillor	Party
2017	Sue Heins	Your Northern Beaches	Rory Amon	Liberal	Vincent De Luca	Independent
2021	Sue Heins	Your Northern Beaches	Rory Amon	Liberal	Vincent De Luca	True Independents
2021	Ruth Robins	Your Northern Beaches	Bianca Crvelin	Liberal	Vincent De Luca	True Independents

=== Pittwater Ward ===
Year	Councillor	Party	Councillor	Party	Councillor	Party
2017	Ian White	Your Northern Beaches	Kylie Ferguson	Liberal	Alex McTaggart	Community Alliance
2021	Ian White	Your Northern Beaches	Kylie Ferguson	Liberal	Alex McTaggart	Independent
2021	Michael Gencher	Your Northern Beaches	Rory Amon	Liberal	Miranda Korzy	Greens
2023	Michael Gencher	Your Northern Beaches	Karina Page	Liberal	Miranda Korzy	Greens
2024	Michael Gencher	Liberal	Karina Page	Liberal	Miranda Korzy	Greens

== Suburbs and localities in the LGA ==
The following suburbs are located within Northern Beaches Council:

- Allambie Heights
- Avalon Beach
- Balgowlah
- Balgowlah Heights
- Bayview
- Beacon Hill
- Belrose
- Bilgola Beach
- Bilgola Plateau
- Brookvale
- Church Point
- Clareville
- Clontarf
- Coasters Retreat
- Collaroy
- Collaroy Plateau
- Cottage Point
- Cromer
- Curl Curl
- Currawong Beach
- Davidson
- Dee Why
- Duffys Forest
- Elanora Heights
- Elvina Bay
- Fairlight
- Forestville
- Frenchs Forest
- Freshwater
- Great Mackerel Beach
- Ingleside
- Killarney Heights
- Lovett Bay
- Manly
- Manly Vale
- McCarrs Creek
- Mona Vale
- Morning Bay
- Narrabeen
- Narraweena
- Newport
- North Balgowlah
- North Curl Curl
- North Manly
- North Narrabeen
- Oxford Falls
- Palm Beach
- Queenscliff
- Salt Pan Cove
- Scotland Island
- Seaforth
- Terrey Hills
- Warriewood
- Whale Beach
- Wheeler Heights

The following localities are located within Northern Beaches Council:

- Akuna Bay
- Allambie
- Avalon North
- Bantry Bay
- Barrenjoey
- Bungan Beach
- Bungan Head
- Bungaroo
- Careel Bay
- Careel Head
- Clareville Beach
- Collaroy Beach
- Cromer Heights
- Curl Curl Beach
- Dee Why Beach
- Fishermans Beach (Collaroy)
- Foleys Hill
- Freshwater Beach
- Gooseberry Flat
- Ingleside Heights
- Long Reef Beach (Collaroy)
- Loquat Valley
- Narrabeen Beach
- Narrabeen Peninsula
- North Curl Curl Beach
- North Narrabeen Beach
- Paradise Beach
- Peach Trees
- Sand Point
- Sorlie
- South Warriewood
- Stokes Point
- Taylors Point
- The Basin
- Towlers Bay
- Tumbledown Dick
- Turimetta
- Warriewood Beach
- Wingala

== Demographics ==
At the 2021 census, there were 263,554 people in the Northern Beaches local government area; of these 48.9 per cent were male and 51.1 per cent were female. Aboriginal and Torres Strait Islander people made up 0.6 per cent of the population; the NSW and Australian averages are 3.4 and 3.2 per cent respectively. The median age of people in Northern Beaches Council was 41 years; the national median is 38 years. Children aged 0 – 14 years made up 18.5 per cent of the population and people aged 65 years and over made up 18.2 per cent of the population. Of people in the area aged 15 years and over, 50.8 per cent were married and 37.6 per cent were not married.

At the 2021 census, 31.1% of residents stated their ancestry as Australian. 51.1% (Note: Excludes not stated responses.) nominated a religious affiliation with Christianity, 19.7% of households speak a non-English language at home; the national average is 24.8 per cent. 81% of households only speak English at home; the national average is 72 per cent.

Selected historical census data for Northern Beaches Council local government area
Census year		2016	2021
Population	Estimated residents on census night	252,878	▲263,554
Population	LGA rank in terms of population size within New South Wales	4th	4th
Population	% of New South Wales population	3.38%	▼3.26%
Population	% of Australian population	1.08%	▼1.04%
Cultural and language diversity			
Ancestry, top responses	English	40.9%	▲41.2%
Ancestry, top responses	Australian	31.2%	▼31.1%
Ancestry, top responses	Irish	13.0%	▼12.5%
Ancestry, top responses	Scottish	10.5%	▲10.8%
Ancestry, top responses	Italian	4.9%	▲5.5%
Language, used at home (other than English)	Italian	1.3%	▼1.2%
Language, used at home (other than English)	Mandarin	1.3%	1.3%
Language, used at home (other than English)	Portuguese	1.0%	▲1.3%
Language, used at home (other than English)	French	0.9%	▲1.0%
Language, used at home (other than English)	German	0.9%	0.9%
Language, used at home (other than English)	Spanish	0.9%	▲1.2%
Religious affiliation			
Religious affiliation, top responses	No religion, so described (Note: In accordance with the Australian Bureau of Statistics source, 'No Religion, so described' does not include those who reported Secular and Other Spiritual Beliefs such as Atheism, Agnosticism and Own Spiritual Beliefs.)	33.7%	▲43.1%
Religious affiliation, top responses	Catholic	24.2%	▼22.8%
Religious affiliation, top responses	Anglican	17.8%	▼14.5%
Religious affiliation, top responses	Not stated	8.4%	▼4.7%
Religious affiliation, top responses	Uniting Church	2.7%	▼2.0%
Median weekly incomes			
Personal income	Median weekly personal income	A$916	A$1,109
Personal income	% of Australian median income	138.4%	137.8%
Family income	Median weekly family income	A$2,528	A$3,131
Family income	% of Australian median income	145.8%	147.7%
Household income	Median weekly household income	A$2,178	A$2,592
Household income	% of Australian median income	151.5%	148.5%

== Heritage listings ==
The Northern Beaches Council has a number of heritage-listed sites, including:

In Avalon

- 32 Plateau Road: Walter Burley Griffin Lodge
- 111 Whale Beach Road: Loggan Rock

In Balgowlah

- 83 Griffiths Street: Balgowlah Substation

In Clareville

- 62 Chisholm Road: Hy Brasil (house)

In Currawong Beach

- Currawong Workers' Holiday Camp

In Killarney Heights

- Bantry Bay Explosives Depot

In Manly

- 151 Darley Road: St Patrick's Seminary
- North Head Scenic Drive: North Head Quarantine Station
- West Esplanade: Manly Cove Pavilion
- West Esplanade: Manly Wharf
- 34a-36 Whistler Street: Manly Substation

In Manly Vale

- near King Street: Manly Dam

In Palm Beach

- Barrenjoey Headland: Barrenjoey Head Lighthouse

== Council logo ==
In July 2017 the new council logo was unveiled by CEO Mark Ferguson at the cost of $320,000: "It was necessary to have something that was a reflection of the Northern Beaches Council looking to the future and having it based on a strong level of community participation." The logo was developed as a result of a consultation process with community groups and council staff to ascertain a representative image for the unified council. The logo takes the form of a stylised wave made up of various images including local flora and fauna such as a humpback whale, a Norfolk pine and cabbage-tree palm, a pelican and a weedy seadragon.

== See also ==
- Local government areas of New South Wales
- List of local government areas in New South Wales
