= Manly, New South Wales =

Manly
- Suburb
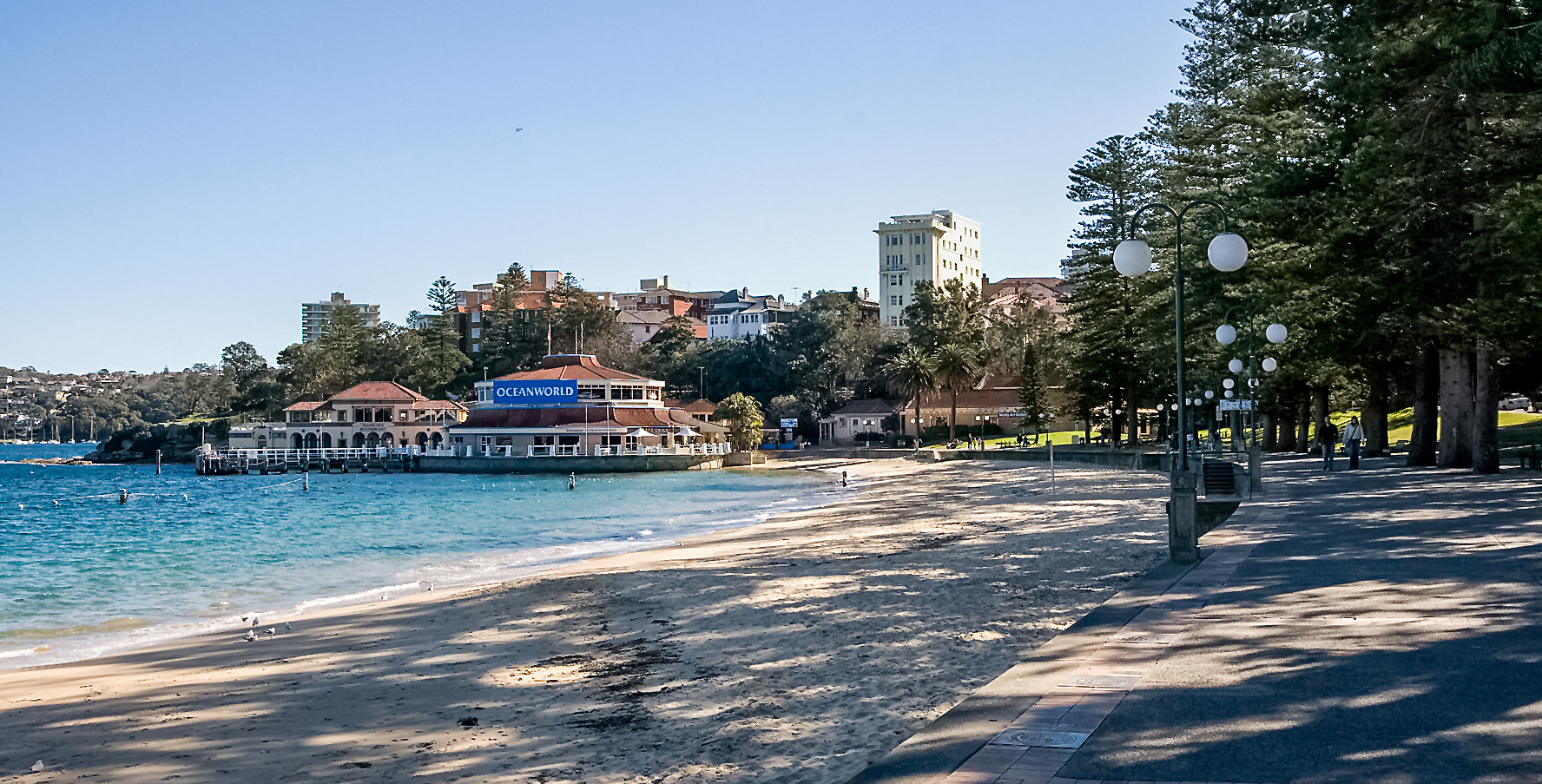
- Manly Cove Beach

- Interactive map of Manly
- Country: Australia
- State: New South Wales
- City: Sydney
- LGA: Northern Beaches Council
- Location: 17 km (11 mi) north-east of Sydney CBD

Government
  - State electorate: Manly
  - Federal division: Warringah

Area
  - Total: 5.6 km^{2} (2.2 sq mi)
- Elevation: 12 m (39 ft)

Population
  - Total: 16,296 (SAL 2021)
- Postcode: 2095
Suburbs around Manly
Manly Vale	North Manly
Fairlight	Manly	Pacific Ocean
North Harbour	North Head

Manly is a beach-side suburb of northern Sydney, in the state of New South Wales, Australia. It is 17 kilometres (11 mi) north-east of the Sydney central business district and is currently one of the three administrative centres of the local government area of Northern Beaches Council. Manly has a long-standing reputation as a tourist destination, owing to its attractive setting on the Pacific Ocean and easy accessibility by ferry.

== History ==
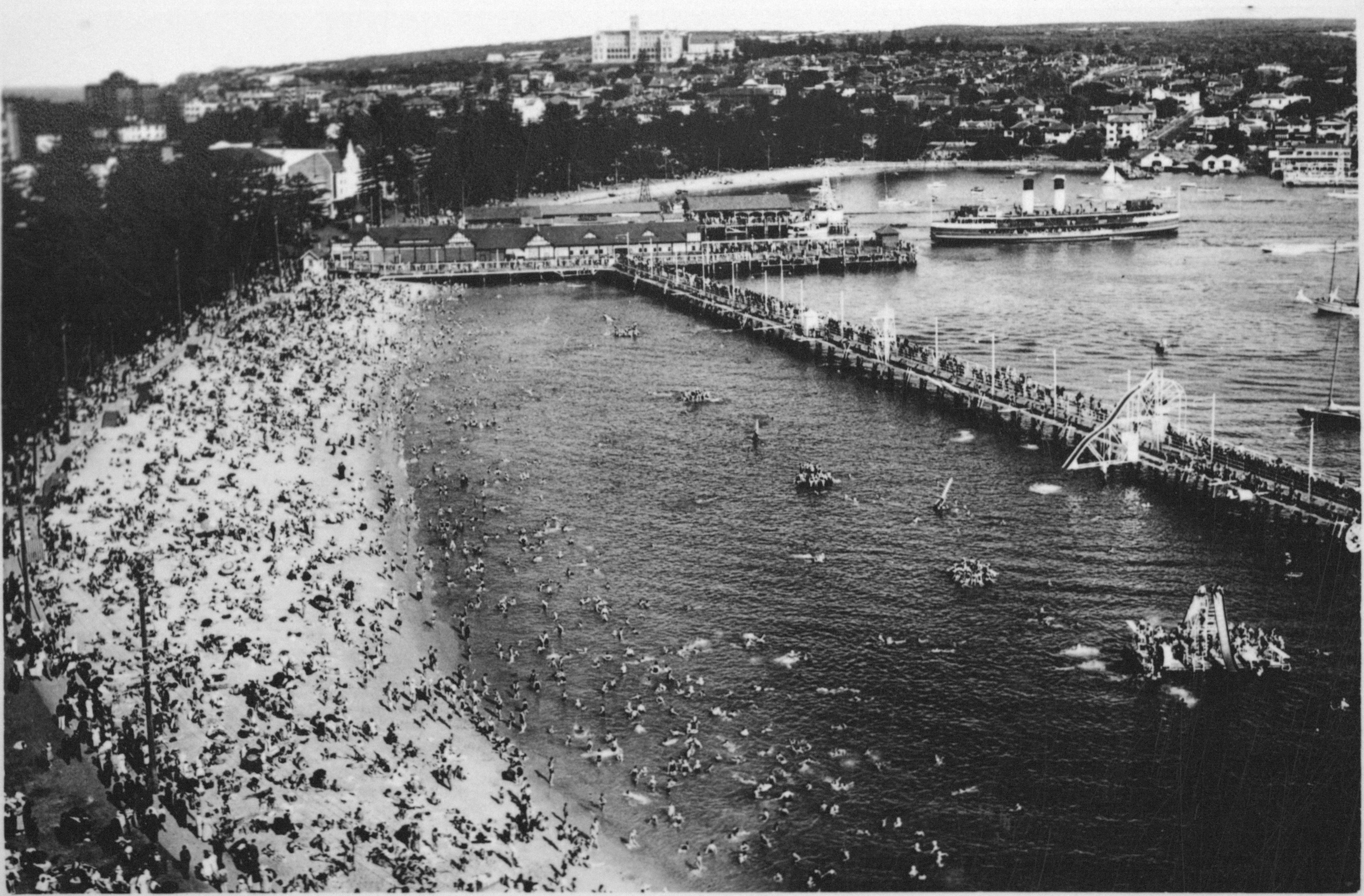
Manly Cove including the ferry terminal

Manly was named by Captain Arthur Phillip for the Aboriginal Australians living there, stating that "their confidence and manly behaviour made me give the name of Manly Cove to this place". These men were of the Kay-ye-my clan (of the Dharug-speaking Gayemaygal people). While scouting for fresh water in the area, Phillip encountered members of the clan, and after a kidnapping he was speared in the shoulder by one of the clan as a punishment ritual; the progressively-minded Phillip ordered his men not to retaliate. In Capt. Tench's words,

The Aboriginal men were feasting on a whale at Manly Cove and were seen by Captain Nepean, Mr White, Nanbaree & a party of men who had travelled to Manly Cove to walk to Broken Bay. Bennelong and Colebee spoke to them and Bennelong asked for Governor Phillip. Captain Nepean sent the Boatswain back to Governor Phillip at South Head. The Aboriginal men cut large chunks of whale off and put them in the boat for Governor Phillip. The military party then proceeded on their walk to Broken Bay. When Governor Phillip's party arrived to see the Aboriginal men they held friendly conversation with Bennelong and Colebee for over half an hour. Later an older Aboriginal man appeared with a spear. Captain Tench remarked that he was seemingly a stranger and little acquainted with Bennelong and Colebee. The Governor moved towards this man and the man became agitated. Governor Phillip threw down his dirk to appease the man crying out confidently. The spear was thrown and Governor Phillip was hit in the shoulder. All was in confusion, there were calls to bring the muskets, Bennelong and Colebee disappeared and Governor Phillip could not make it to the ship because of the length of spear sticking from his shoulder and dragging on the ground. The muskets were brought to shore but only one would fire. The spear was finally broken and all hastened to Port Jackson.

Manly had been envisaged as a seaside resort by Henry Gilbert Smith in the 1850s. In 1853, Smith acquired two large parcels of land (which had been granted to John Thompson in 1842 and John Crane Parker in 1837).

Initially John had chartered a paddle steamer to Manly and other vessels visited on an ad hoc "excursion" basis. Smith built a wharf on the harbour-side of Manly, which was completed in October 1855 and eventually acquired an interest in steamers himself - as part of developing more regular services to Manly to assist his sub-division property sales.

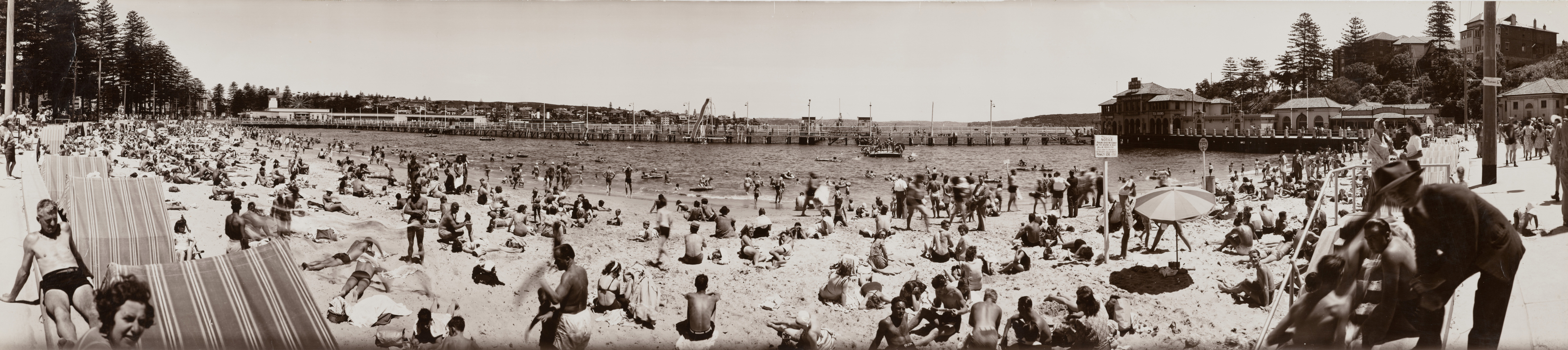
Manly Beach, Sydney, 1950

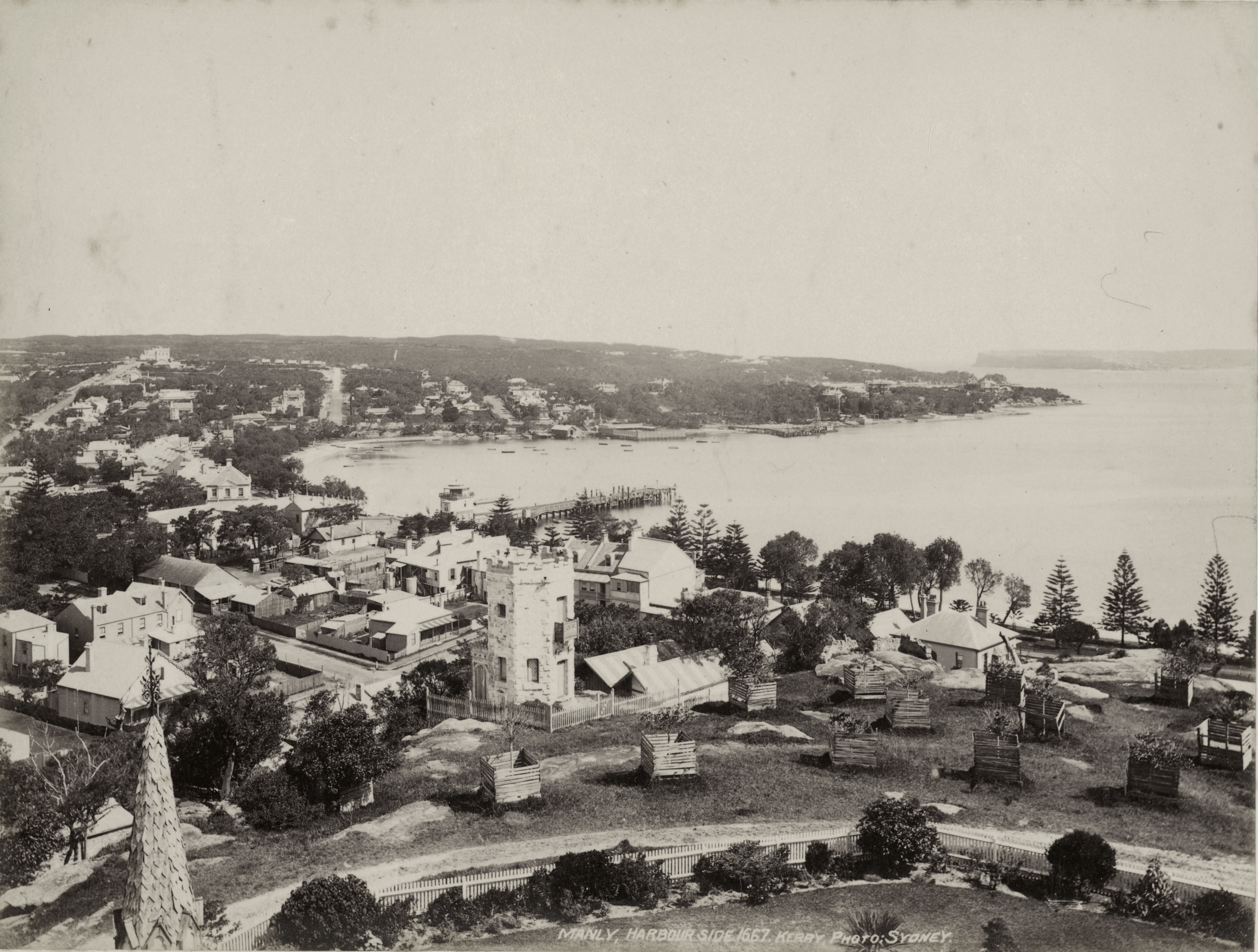
The harbour side of Manly in the 1885-1895

By 1873, Smith had sold the lease to the wharf and his share of the steamers to the operators of the ferries and eventually ownership passed to the once famous Port Jackson & Manly Steamship Company. It was the Port Jackson & Manly Steamship Company which coined the expression about Manly being "Seven miles from Sydney and a thousand miles from care" to promote its ferry service. The Port Jackson & Manly Steamship Company played an important part in Manly's development. It built several attractions including a large ocean pool and bathing pavilion, the Manly Fun Pier. In 1972 the company was sold to Brambles and in 1974 to the Government of New South Wales and it is now part of Sydney Ferries.

In March 1885, as the New South Wales Contingent was about to depart for the Sudan, a letter was addressed to Premier William Bede Dalley containing a cheque for £25 for the Patriotic Fund "with my best wishes from a little boy at Manly". It was Australia's first overseas military adventure, and the "Little Boy from Manly" became a symbol either of patriotism or, among opponents of the adventure, of mindless chauvinism. especially due to a cartoon by Livingston Hopkins of The Bulletin.

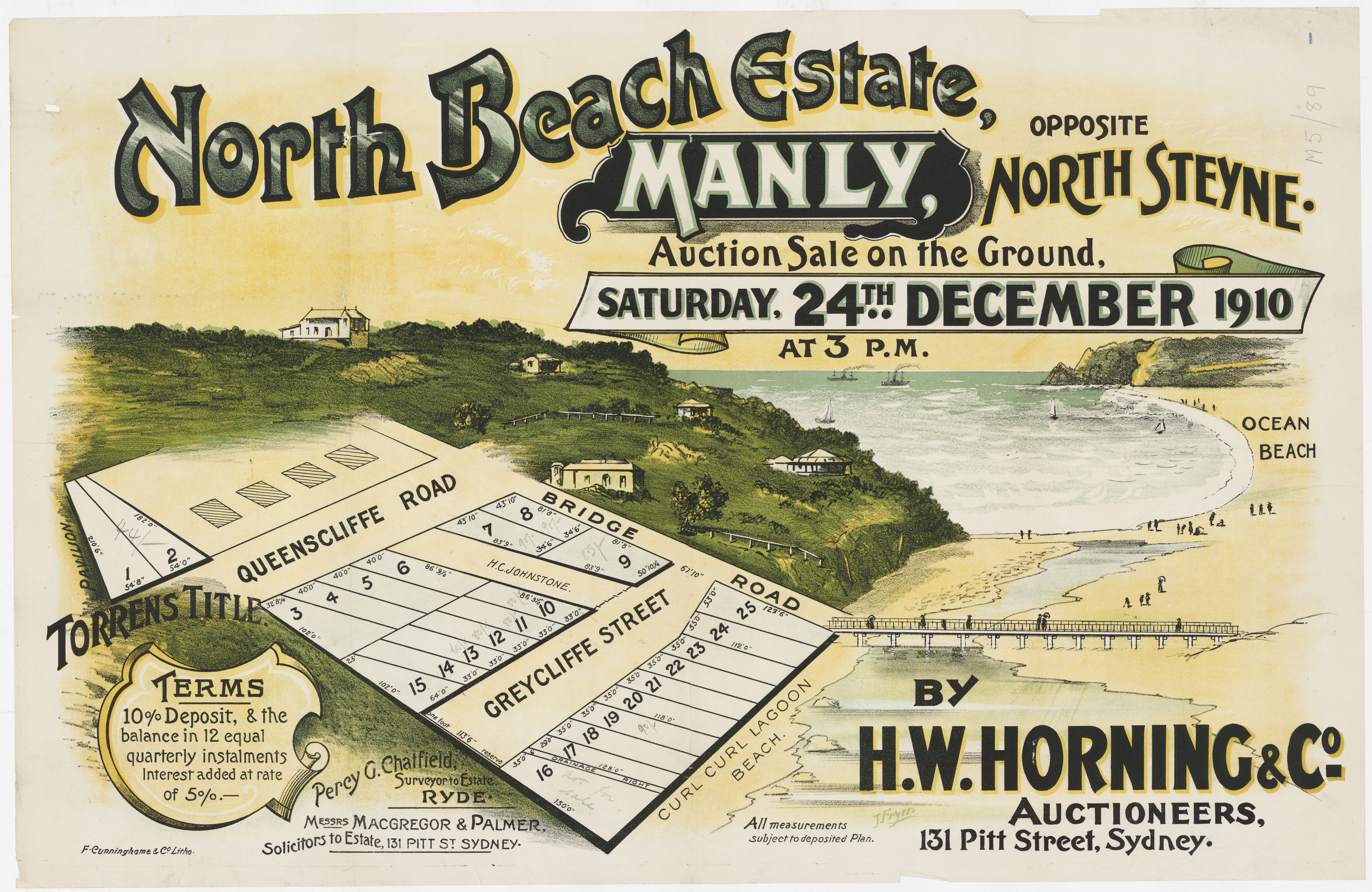
North Beach Estate, Manly, 1910, H. W. Horning, subdivision plan

In 1896, the first film ever made in Australia was Marius Sestier's Passengers Alighting from Ferry Brighton at Manly. The film, consisting of footage of the PS Brighton arriving at the wharf, premiered at the Salon Lumière on Pitt St (Australia's first cinema) on 27 October 1896. No copy is known to have survived.

During the 19th and early 20th centuries, Manly was one of Australia's most popular seaside holiday resorts. Manly Beach is said to be the place where the restriction on daylight sea bathing was first challenged in Australia. In October 1902 William Gocher, clad in a neck to knee costume, swam at midday after announcing his intention to do so in the newspaper he had established (Manly and North Sydney News). After being ignored by authorities and being publicly critical of them, he swam again and was escorted from the water by the police, although no charges were laid. In November 1903, Manly Council resolved to allow all-day bathing provided a neck to knee swimming costume was worn. During the first official bathing season in 1903, 17 people drowned on Manly Beach. A year later a surf club was formed on the beach to safeguard the public. While there is debate about which club is the oldest, Manly Life Saving Club is one of the world's first surf life saving clubs.

In 1934, George Robey, a resident and original Anzac founded the Air Mindedness Development League which was later renamed the "Australian Air League" at Manly. There has been a continuously running squadron in Manly since. In 1937 Manly Town Hall was opened.

In 1973, residents in the Eastern Hill section of Manly requested that the NSW Builders Labourers Federation place a green ban on the construction of two large tower blocks by LJ Hooker. The BLF agreed to do so and asked them to draw up a community plan for the area's future.

== Heritage listings ==
Manly has a number of heritage-listed sites, including:

- 151 Darley Road: St Patrick's Seminary
- North Head Scenic Drive: North Head Quarantine Station
- Sydney Road: Ivanhoe Park cultural landscape
- West Esplanade: Manly Cove Pavilion
- West Esplanade: Manly ferry wharf
- 34a–36 Whistler Street: Manly Substation

== Climate ==
Manly has a humid subtropical climate (Cfa) with warm summers and mild winters.

Climate data for Manly Town Hall (1915-1956)
Month	Jan	Feb	Mar	Apr	May	Jun	Jul	Aug	Sep	Oct	Nov	Dec	Year
Mean daily maximum °C (°F)	26.6 (79.9)	26.5 (79.7)	25.4 (77.7)	22.9 (73.2)	20.3 (68.5)	17.9 (64.2)	17.4 (63.3)	18.7 (65.7)	21.1 (70.0)	22.9 (73.2)	24.6 (76.3)	25.6 (78.1)	22.5 (72.5)
Mean daily minimum °C (°F)	18.1 (64.6)	18.4 (65.1)	16.9 (62.4)	14.0 (57.2)	11.3 (52.3)	9.0 (48.2)	7.9 (46.2)	8.7 (47.7)	10.7 (51.3)	13.1 (55.6)	15.0 (59.0)	16.9 (62.4)	13.3 (55.9)
Average precipitation mm (inches)	101.6 (4.00)	105.1 (4.14)	117.4 (4.62)	132.4 (5.21)	132.9 (5.23)	125.6 (4.94)	101.2 (3.98)	84.2 (3.31)	69.3 (2.73)	81.6 (3.21)	83.4 (3.28)	85.4 (3.36)	1,191.6 (46.91)
Average precipitation days (≥ 1 mm)	8.3	8.4	9.3	10.1	9.1	9.4	7.5	8.1	7.9	8.5	8.4	8.2	103.2

== Beaches ==
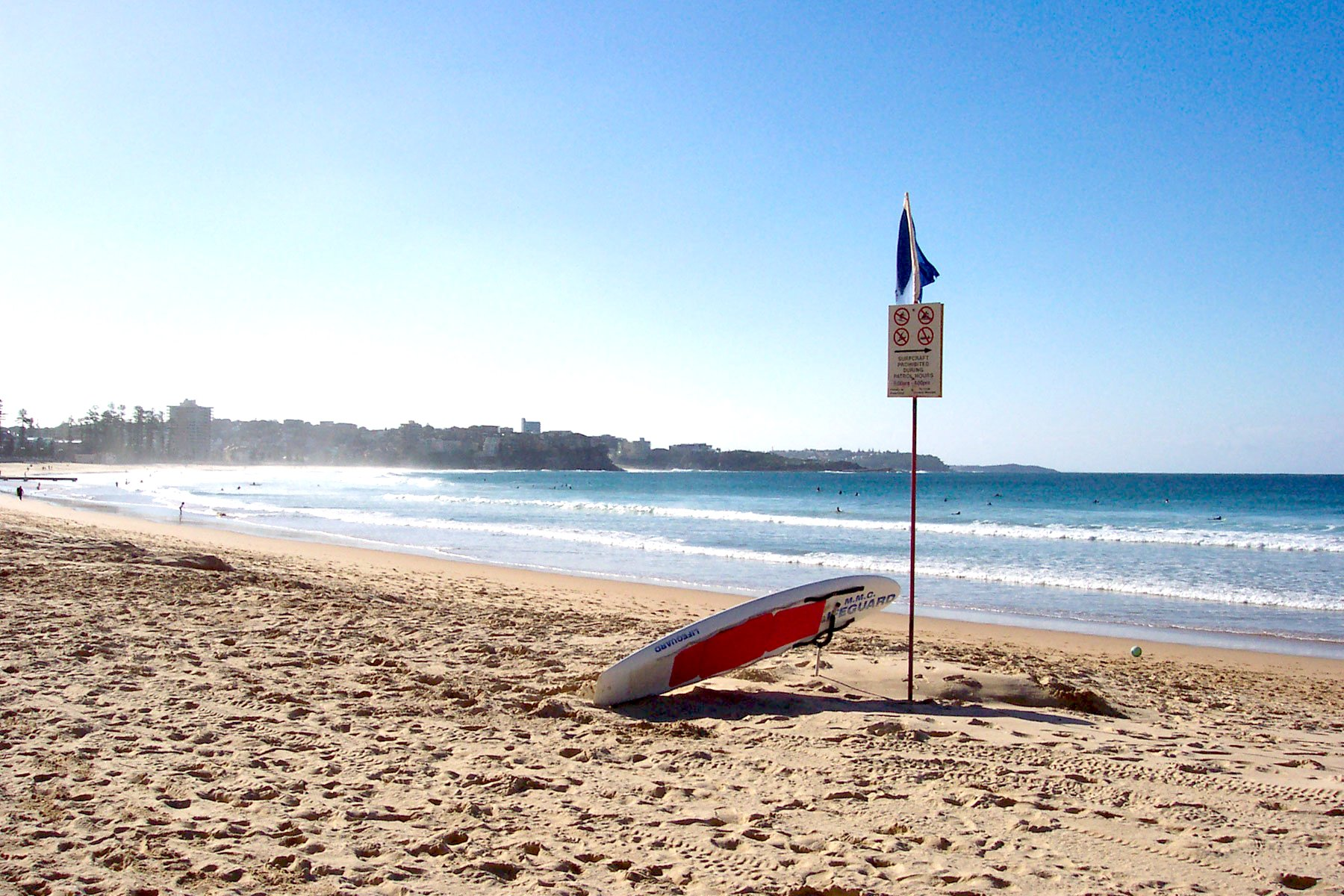
Manly Beach

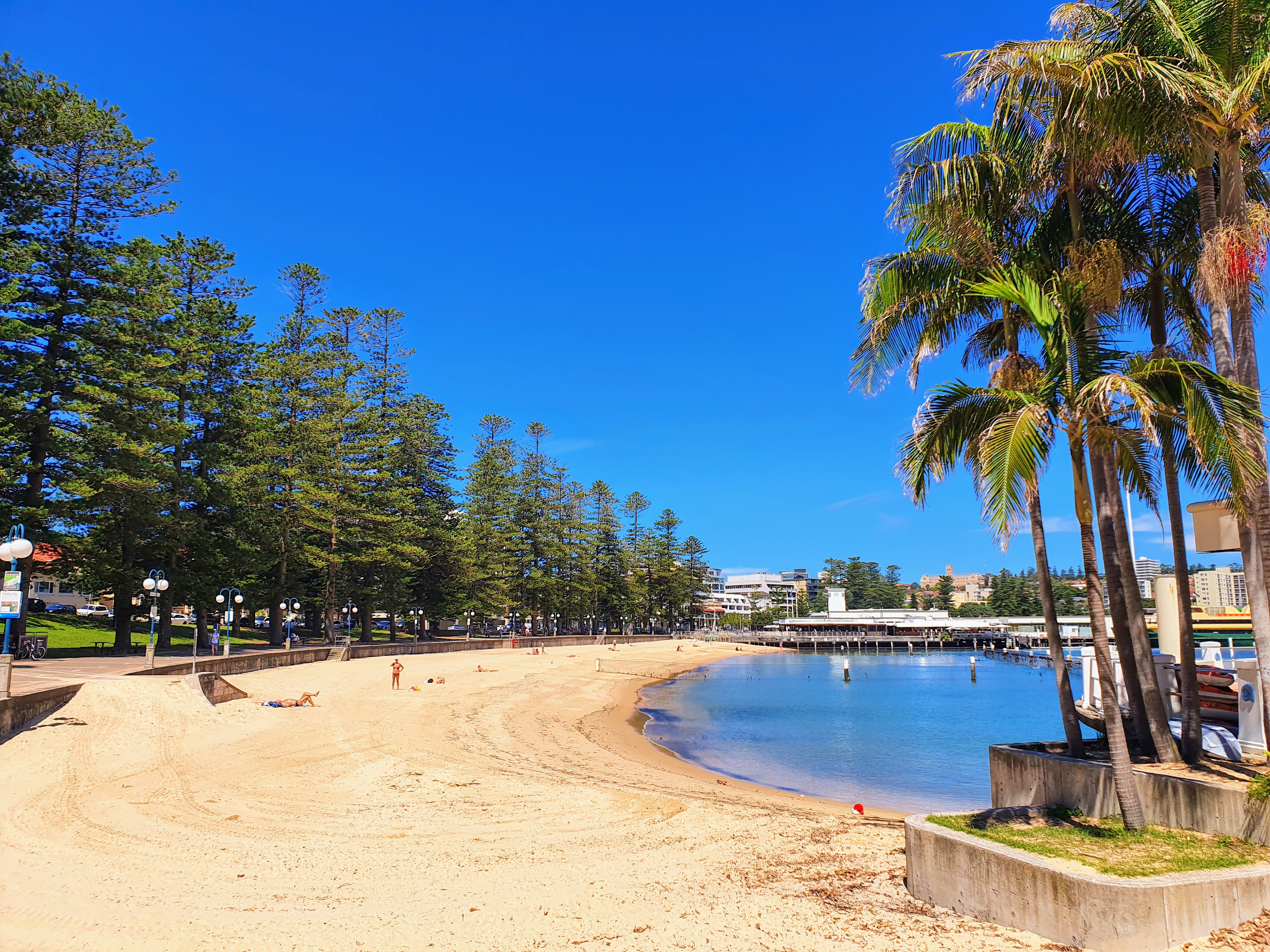
Views over West Manly Cove Beach, the ocean pool and Manly Wharf.

Manly is most notable for its beaches, which are popular tourist destinations. Manly features a long stretch of sand on the ocean side, that runs from Queenscliff through North Steyne to South Steyne. This is followed by rock pools and sandy beaches called Fairy Bower and Shelly Beach. There are also a number of beaches on the harbour side of the peninsula being Collins Beach, Store Beach, Little Manly, East Manly Cove, West Manly Cove, Delwood Beach and Fairlight Beach. Norfolk Island pine trees are symbolic of Manly and are a prominent feature of both the ocean and harbour beaches.

On 10 March 2012, the 4-kilometre (2.5 mi) stretch between Freshwater Beach and Shelly Beach was declared the "Manly -Freshwater World Surfing Reserve". The Reserve was dedicated in a ceremony in Manly Beach by world surfing champion Kelly Slater accompanied by the Governor of New South Wales, Marie Bashir.

== Commercial area ==
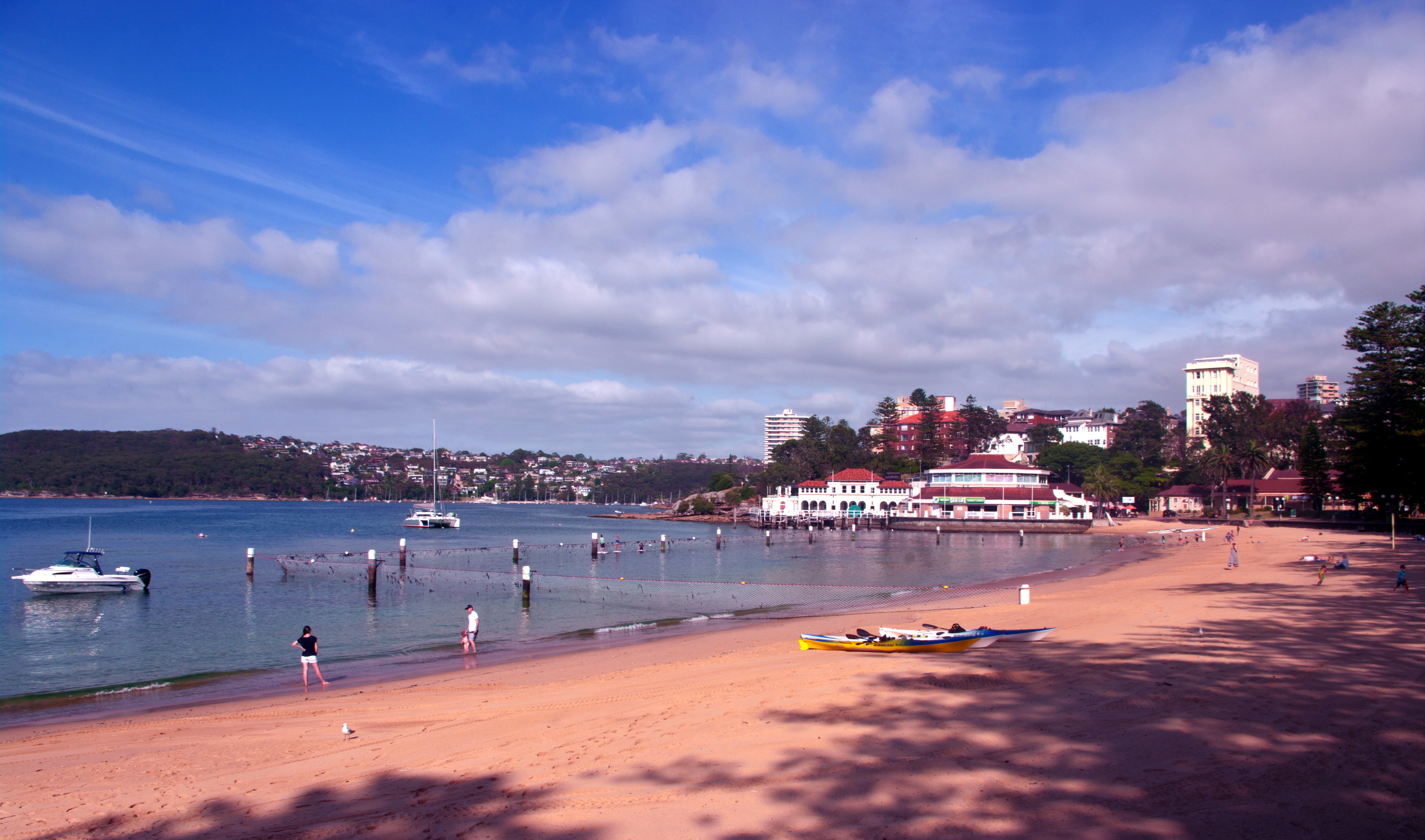
Manly beach and Seaworld

The commercial centre in Manly is around the Corso, which runs from the harbour side at Manly Wharf to the ocean side at Manly Beach. Part of the Corso is a mall which allows outdoor dining for cafés and restaurants. The commercial area extends to surrounding streets with more cafes and restaurants concentrated along the ocean and harbour shores.

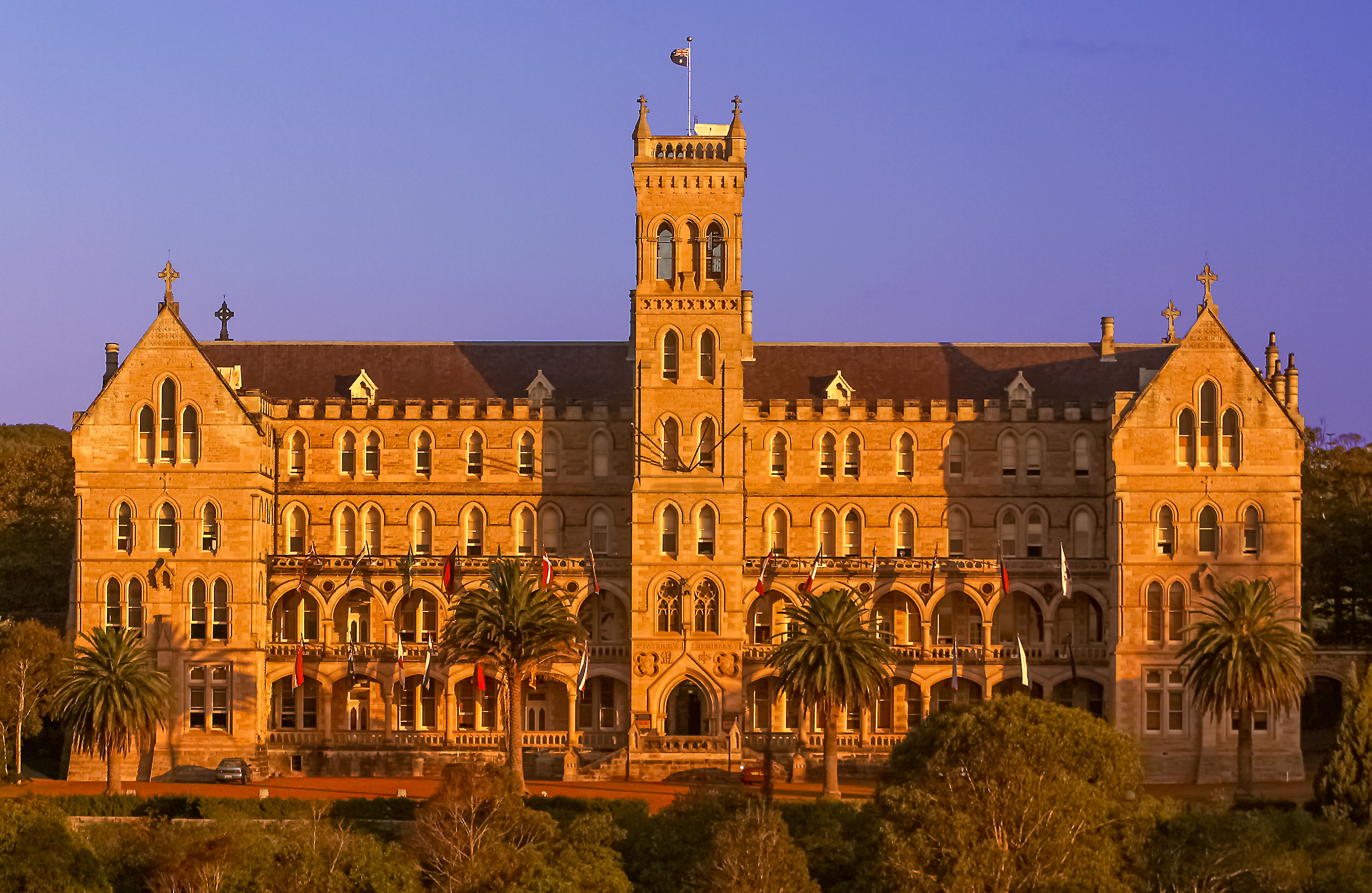
St Patrick's Seminary, later privatised for other uses

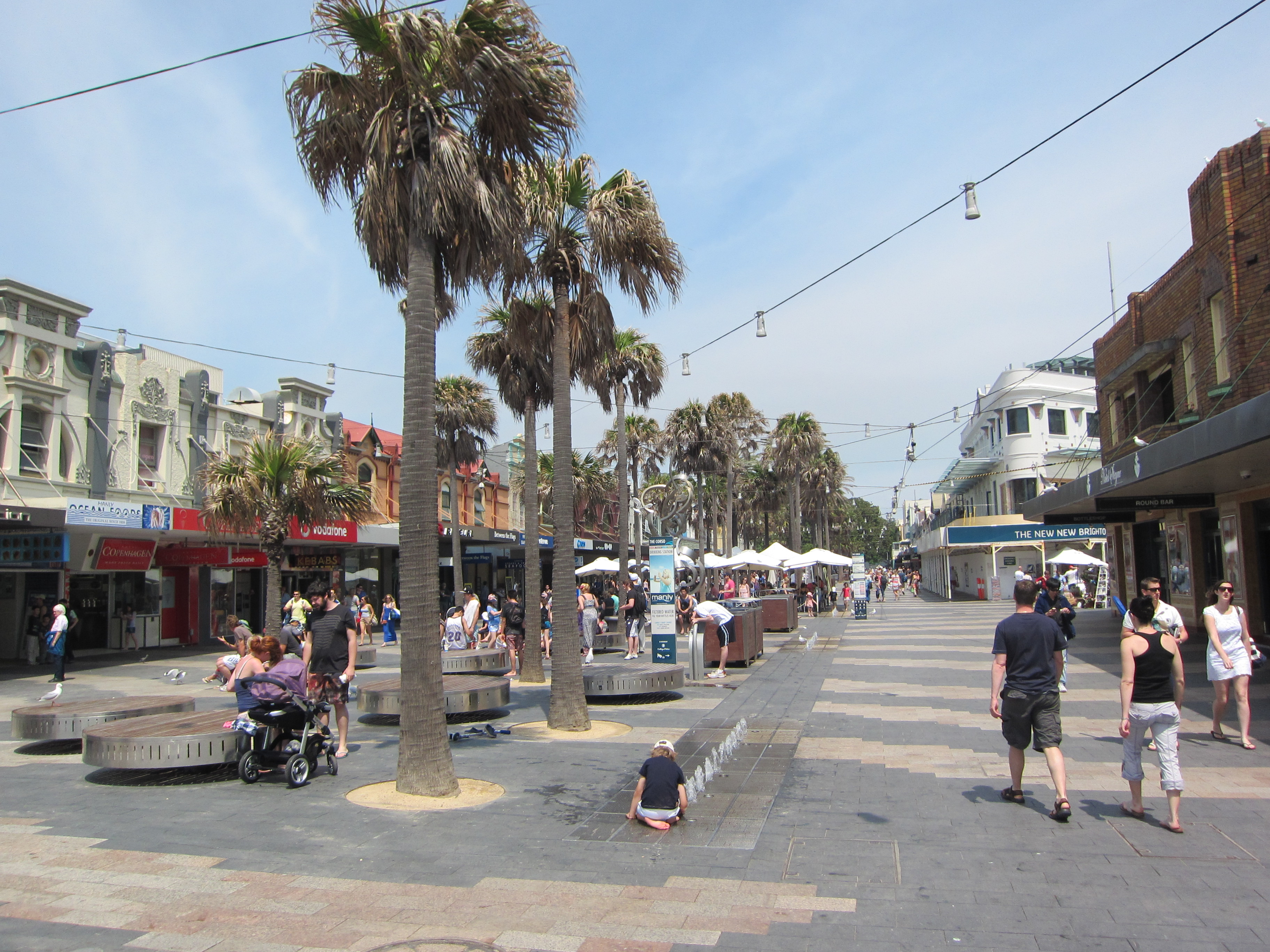
The Corso

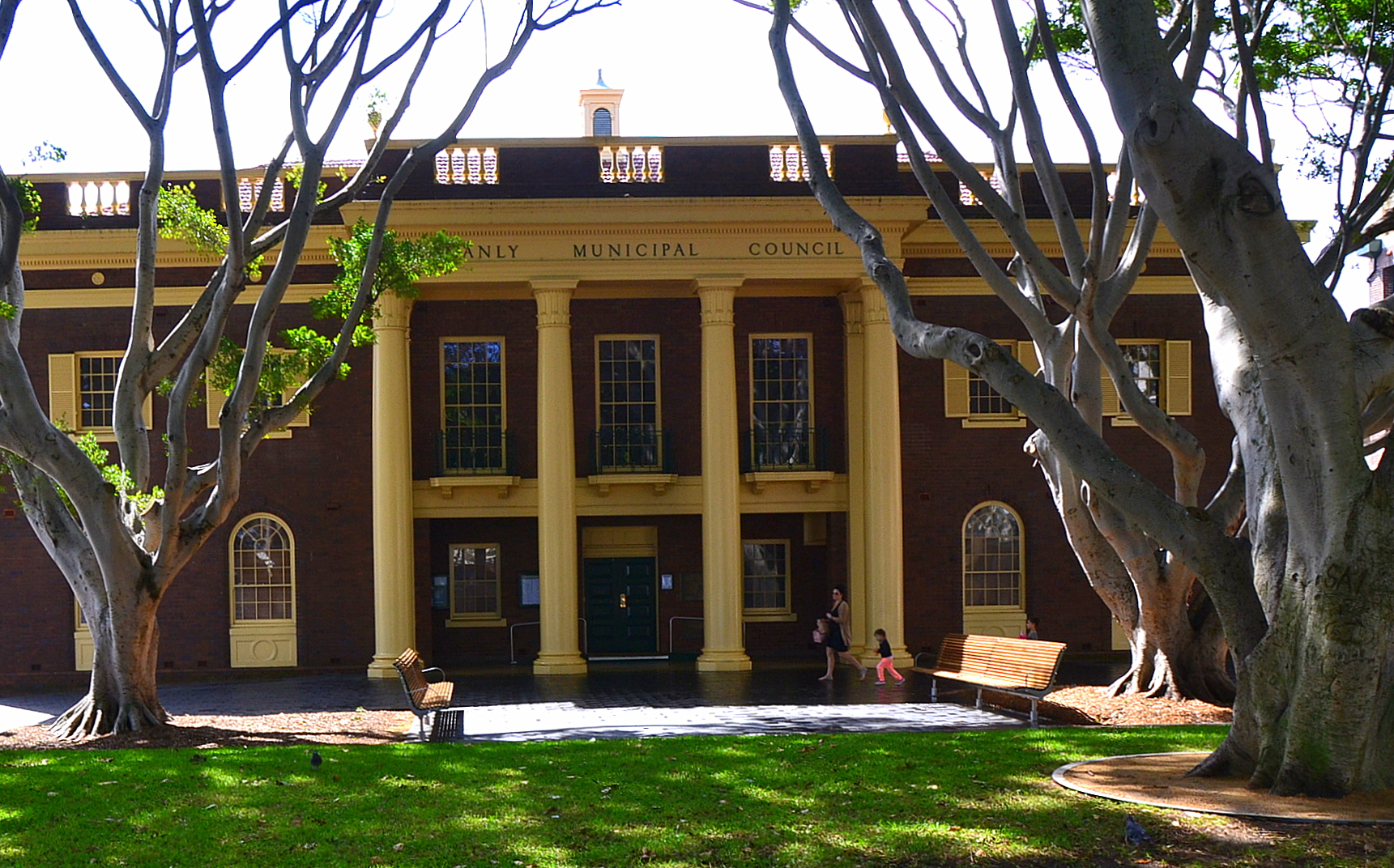
Manly Town Hall

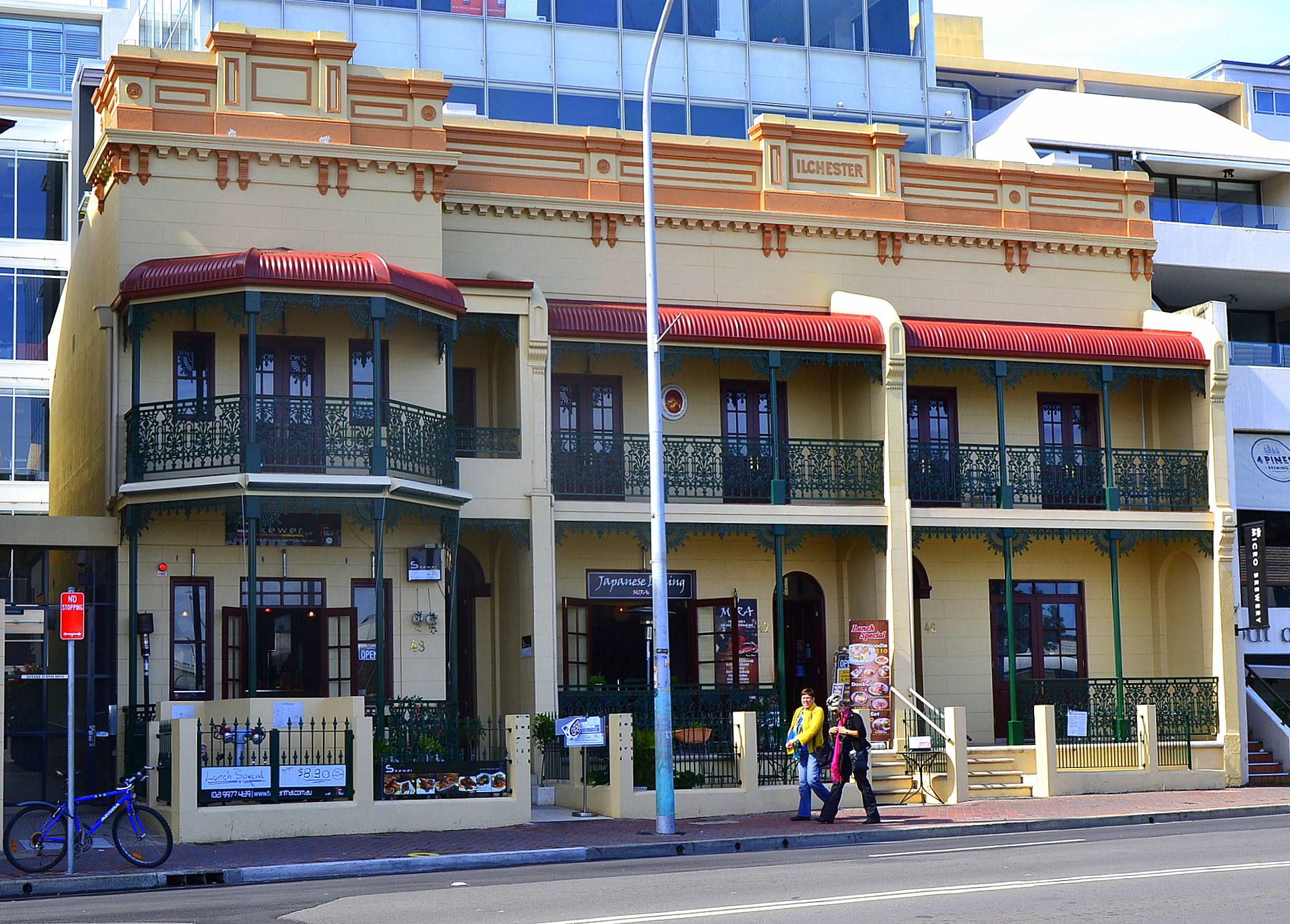
Ilchester terraced houses on East Esplanade

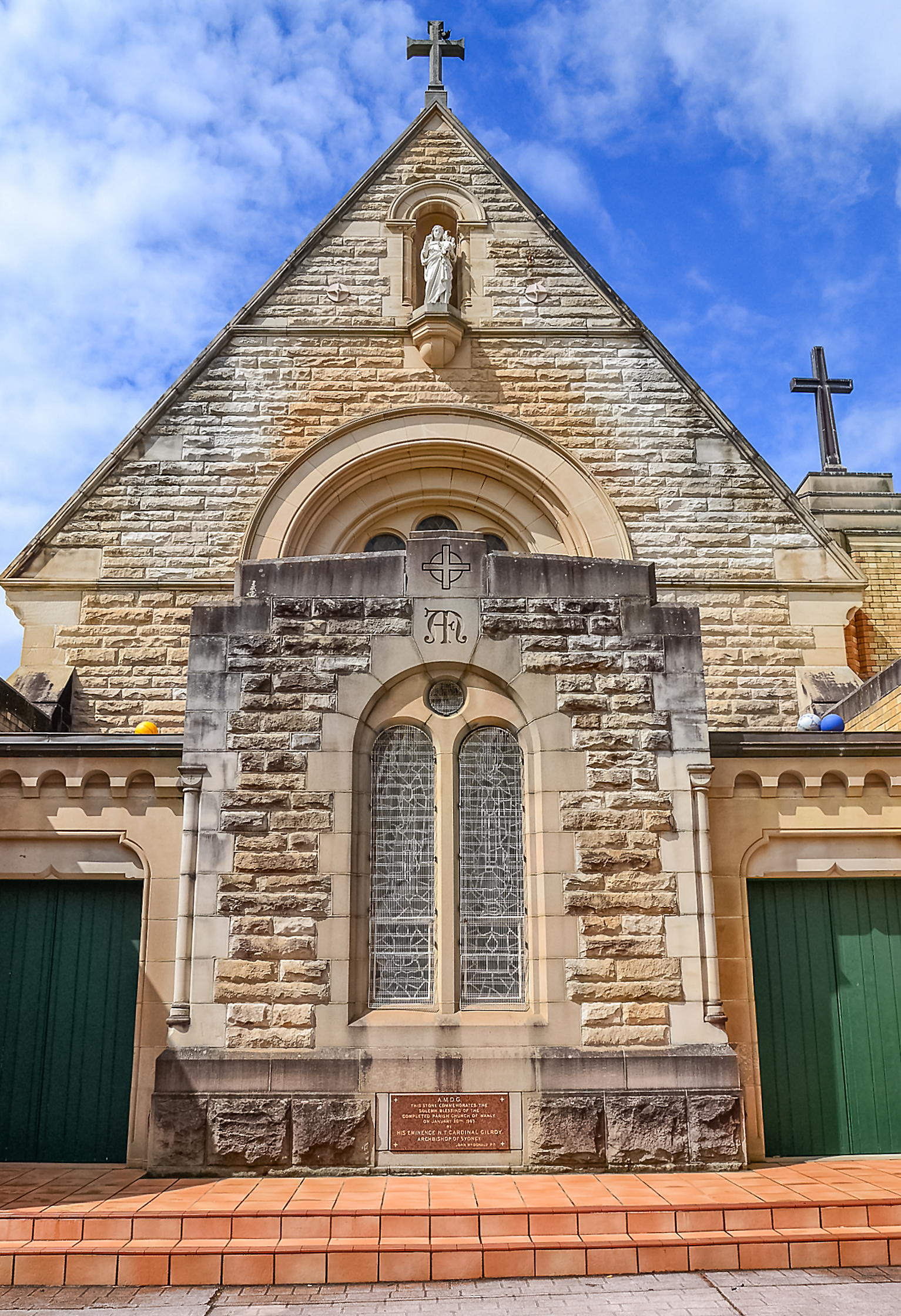
St Mary's Catholic Church

Baz Luhrmann's The Great Gatsby (2013) was filmed in Sydney, primarily in Manly and Balmain. St Patrick's Seminary was used as Jay Gatsby's mansion–palm trees at the building's exterior had to be digitally removed in post-production to create a realistic depiction of the Eastern United States (specifically Long Island), where the novel and film are set.

== Demographics ==
According to the 2021 census, there were 16,296 residents in Manly. 55.2% of residents were born in Australia. The next most common countries of birth were England 11.7%, New Zealand 3.2%, the United States of America 2.9%, Brazil 1.9% and South Africa 1.7%. 79.6% of residents spoke only English at home. Other languages spoken at home included Spanish 2.5%, French 2.0%, Portuguese 1.9%, German 1.5% and Italian 1.0%. The most common responses for religion in Manly were No Religion 51.1%, Catholic 20.6%, Anglican 11.6% and Christian, not further defined 1.5%.

== Transport ==
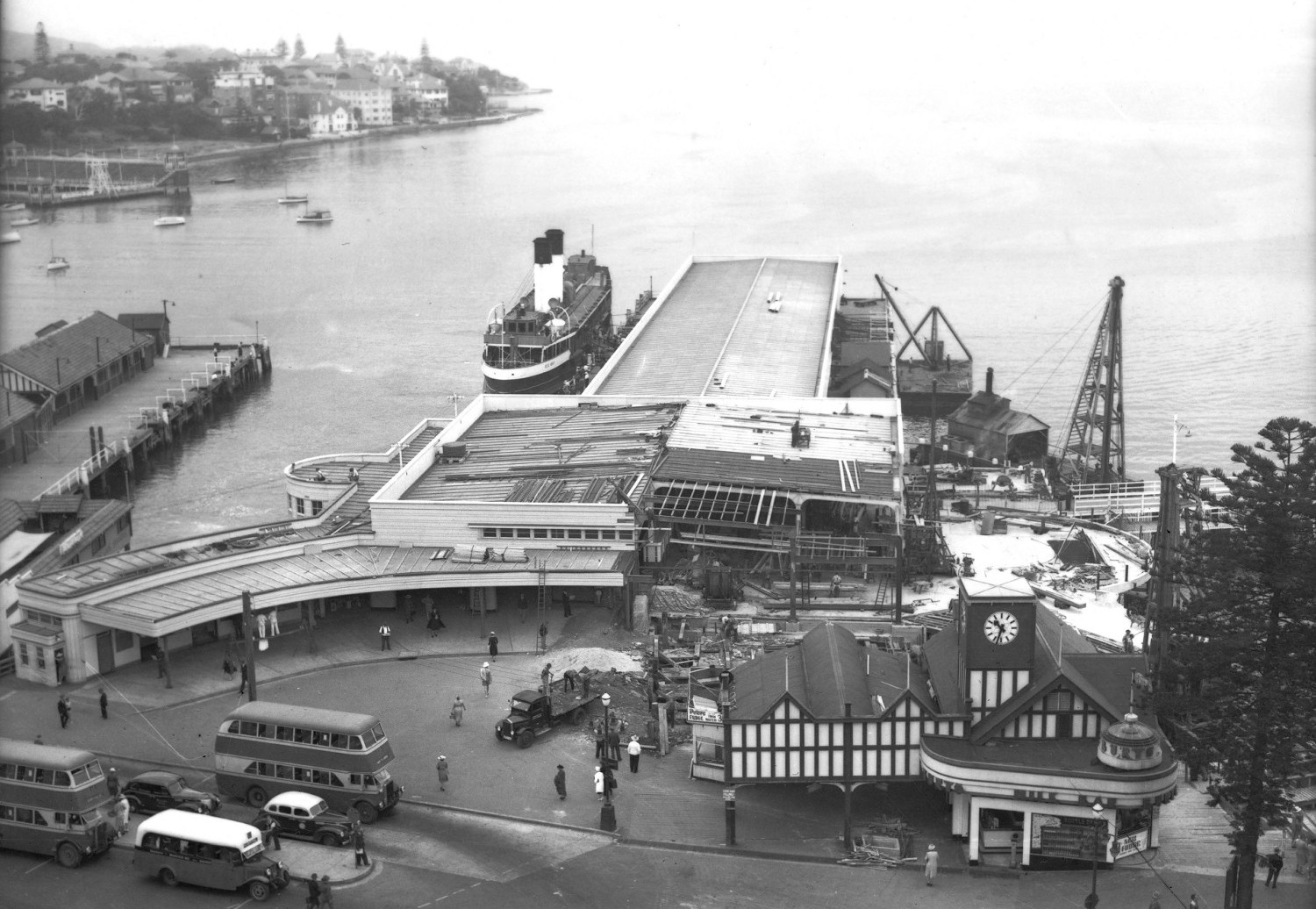
Manly wharf in 1941 with ferry SS Dee Why docked

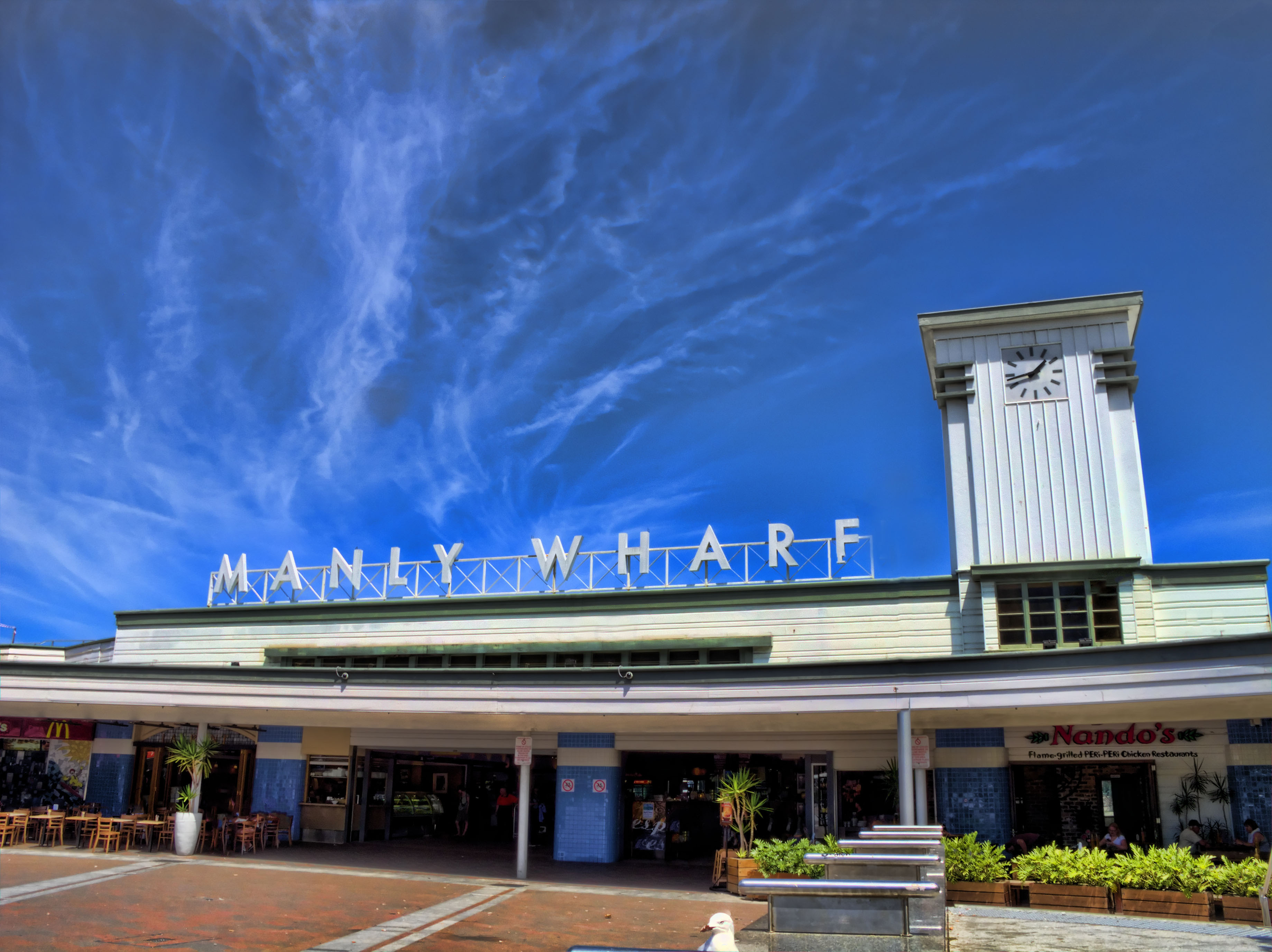
Manly wharf

Ferry services connect Manly Wharf with Circular Quay. These include the F1 Manly service, part of the Sydney Ferries network, and the separately operated Manly Fast Ferry.

Keolis Northern Beaches operates bus services connecting Manly with destinations including Wynyard, Chatswood and Palm Beach. CDC NSW operates services to Austlink via Frenchs Forest and Seaforth, and to Allambie Heights. Northern Beaches Council also operates the Hop, Skip & Jump community bus through Manly, Fairlight and Balgowlah.

The Spit–Manly tram line opened in 1911 and operated until 1939. Its route followed Sydney Road and skirted the western and northern boundaries of Ivanhoe Park. Part of the former tramway alignment remains visible in the park.

Hydrofoil services between Circular Quay and Manly operated from 1965 to 1991 and were replaced by JetCat catamarans. The JetCat service ended on 31 December 2008. Manly Fast Ferry began operating in February 2009.

== Housing ==
The relaxed lifestyle, beaches and proximity to Sydney city have led to Manly's real estate prices being amongst the highest in Australia. The adjoining suburb of Seaforth, which is now also part of Northern Beaches Council, has been ranked as the 25th richest suburb in Australia.

== Schools and churches ==
The former Catholic seminary at St Patrick's Estate, Darley Road, now houses The International College of Management, Sydney (ICMS) a management college, specialising in business, tourism, hospitality, events, property, sports and marketing retail management. It is affiliated with Macquarie University, which attracts international students from many countries. As well as being an educational hub, many spectacular weddings have been held here, including Nicole Kidman and Keith Urban. The original seminary was designed by Hennessy and Sheerin and built in 1885. It was conceived by Archbishop Vaughan and is now listed on the Register of the National Estate.

On the other side of Darley Road is the Archbishop's House, also known as the Cardinal's Palace. This building was also designed by Sheerin and Hennessy and built in the 1880s. It was originally conceived as part of St Patrick's Seminary and is a good example of the Victorian Gothic Revival style. It too is listed on the Register of the National Estate.

Another notable landmark is the Presbyterian Church in Raglan Street. It was designed by John Sulman in the Romanesque style and built in 1892. It is listed on the Register of the National Estate.

The local public school is "Manly Village Public School", which is a co-educational school from kindergarten to year six and is located a street away from Manly Beach.

The closest secondary school for Manly is St Pauls College, which is a local co-ed high school for years 7 to 12. The closest selective secondary school is Manly Selective Campus which caters for years seven to 12 and is located in the neighbouring suburb of Curl Curl.

== Recreation ==
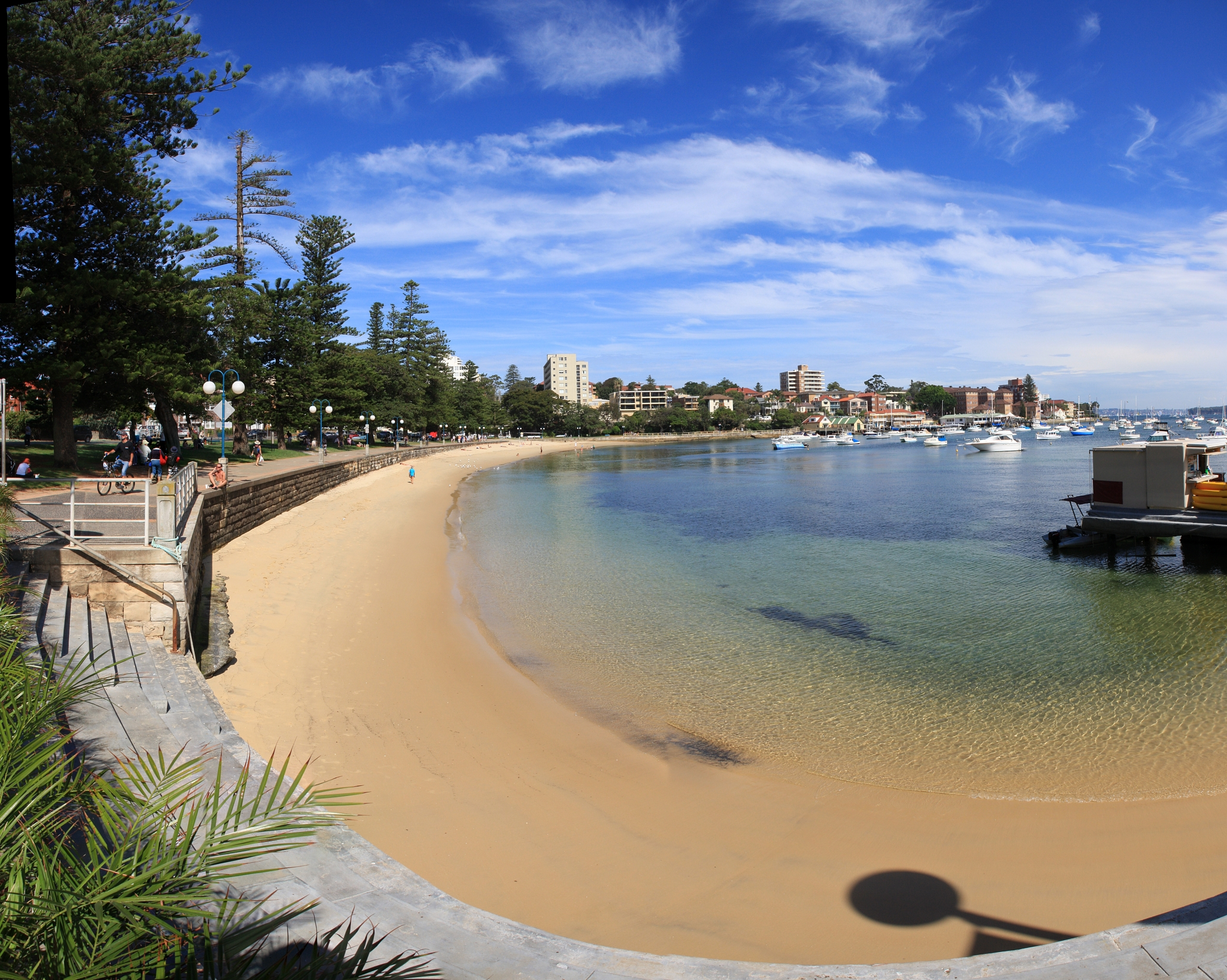
Calm water on the harbour side of Manly

Manly has Sydney Harbour on its western side with calm water, ferry wharf, a swimming area, the former Manly Sea Life Sanctuary aquarium, and sailing and yacht clubs. About 300 metres (1,000 ft) to the east is the Pacific Ocean and Manly Beach. There are more than 20 kilometres (12 mi) of cycle tracks that can be used to explore the area.

The Manly International Jazz Festival is Australia's largest community-based jazz festival. It is held during the October long weekend public holiday, with various stages hosting continuous free public performances from midday until early evening. The BBC soap opera Out of the Blue was set in Manly.

== Sport ==
National Rugby League team the Manly Warringah Sea Eagles who play their home games at Brookvale Oval, are the most famous sports club in the area who are well known for their Grand Final appearances, being the only club to appear in Grand Finals in each decade from the 1950s to the 2010s, and the only club to win at least one Grand Final in each decade from the 1970s to the 2010s. Their fans from the northern beaches have a reputation for being reluctant to cross the Spit Bridge.

The rugby union team Manly RUFC and soccer team Manly United Football Club represent Manly. The Manly Warringah District Cricket Club represent the Northern Beaches. Manly RUFC and the MWDCC play at Manly Oval, while Manly United play at Cromer Park.

== Culture ==
Numerous non-fiction books about Manly have been written. It has also featured in fiction. In 1987 the British novelist, Lesley Thomson published Seven Miles From Sydney, a thriller about a female screenwriter who is murdered while jogging on Shelly Beach. This novel was a popular seller in the United Kingdom and well received in Australia. The music video for Redfoo's song "Let’s Get Ridiculous" was filmed on the Corso.

Manly is a sister city of Bath, England.

== Notable people ==
Notable current and former residents from the Manly area include:

- Layne Beachley, 7 time world surfing champion.
- Bruce Beaver, poet.
- Gladys Berejiklian, 45th Premier of New South Wales.
- Michael Bevan, cricketer.
- Sylvia Breamer, actress.
- Boy Charlton, Olympic freestyle swimmer.
- Adam Cuthbertson, rugby league player.
- Roden Cutler, former NSW governor and recipient of the Victoria Cross.
- Douglas Darby, Member of Parliament for Manly for 33 years.
- Anthony Don, rugby league player.
- Jamie Durie, television host.
- Dan Ewing, actor.
- John Flanagan, author.
- Kitty Flanagan, actress.
- Penny Flanagan, singer and author.
- Flume, musician.
- David Fry, politician in the Tasmanian House of Assembly.
- Melinda Gainsford-Taylor, Olympic sprinter.
- John Gibbs, rugby league player and sportscaster.
- Reece Hodge, rugby union player.
- Thomas Keneally, Booker Prize-winning author.
- Barton Lynch, surfer.
- Matthew Nable, actor.
- John Passmore, philosopher.
- Peter Philpott, cricketer.
- Chad Randall, rugby league player.
- Zali Steggall, incumbent federal MP for Warringah. and Winter Olympian
- Zeke Steggall, snowboarder.
- Kylie Tennant, author.
- Jack Thompson, actor.
- Taine Tuaupiki, rugby league player.
- Tania Verstak, model and beauty queen crowned Miss International 1962.
- Sam Wicks, Australian rules footballer.
- Elisabeth Wynhausen, journalist and writer.

== Sister cities ==
- Huntington Beach, United States (unofficial)
- Bath, England
