= Your Northern Beaches Independent Team =

- Abbreviation: YNBIT; YNB
- Leader: Sue Heins
- Founders: Michael Regan
- Founded: 20 January 2017
- Preceded by: Your Warringah
- Headquarters: Manly Vale, New South Wales, Australia
- Ideology: Localism
- New South Wales Legislative Assembly (Note: Although a member of YNBIT, Michael Regan sits as an independent in the Legislative Assembly.): 1 / 93
- Northern Beaches Council: 7 / 15

Website
- www.yournorthernbeaches.com.au

Your Northern Beaches Independent Team (YNBIT), also known simply as Your Northern Beaches (YNB), is an Australian political party that contests local government elections for Northern Beaches Council in New South Wales. It was founded in 2017 by former Warringah mayor Michael Regan, who currently serves as a member of the New South Wales Legislative Assembly since 2023, and previously served as a councillor until 2024.

The party states it is based on the "principles of representative democracy and transparent government" and says its members "will maintain their independence".

Since May 2023, the party has been led by Northern Beaches mayor Sue Heins.

== History ==
=== Your Warringah ===
In 2008, Regan formed Wake Up Warringah (WUW) for the local government elections on 13 September. At the elections, he was elected mayor and WUW candidates were elected in A Ward, B Ward and C Ward.

Ahead of the 2012 local elections, the party was renamed to Your Warringah (YWP), and Regan was re-elected as mayor with 56.3% of the vote. Six candidates from the party were also elected as councillors.

=== Your Northern Beaches ===
In May 2016, it was announced that Warringah Council, along with the Pittwater and Manly councils, would be merged to establish the Northern Beaches Council with immediate effect.

On 20 January 2017, Regan formed the Your Northern Beaches Independent Team as a successor to Your Warringah, and registered the party with the New South Wales Electoral Commission.

At the 2017 local elections, YNBIT won a plurality on council, with 6 out of 15 seats. The party retained its six seats at the next election in 2021.

Regan was elected to the New South Wales Legislative Assembly as the member for Wakehurst at the 2023 state election. Following this, Curl Curl Ward councillor Sue Heins took over from Regan as party leader and mayor on 16 May 2023.

On 28 January 2024, Pittwater Ward councillor Michael Gencher left YNBIT to join the Liberal Party. According to the Northern Beaches Advocate, Gencher was one of several YNBIT councillors facing "pressure to stand aside" in favour of candidates aligned with teal independents. Heins told the Manly Observer in response that "if Gencher needs more structure, then he has made the right move". As a result of Gencher's defection, YNBIT lost its plurality on council. It regained its plurality at the 2024 local elections, winning 7 out of 15 seats.

== Leaders ==
No.	Image	Name	Term start	Term end	Office
1		Michael Regan	20 January 2017	16 May 2023	Mayor of Northern Beaches (2017−2023)
2		Sue Heins	16 May 2023	incumbent	Mayor of Northern Beaches (2023−present)

== Electoral history ==
Election	Votes	%	Swing	Seats	Change
2017				6 / 15	▲6
2021	46,355	31.1		6 / 15	0
2024	71,095	49.1	+18.0	7 / 15	▲1
