= Electoral results for the district of Warringah =

Election results for Warringah, New South Wales, Australia

Warringah, an electoral district of the Legislative Assembly in the Australian state of New South Wales was created in 1894 and abolished in 1904.

Election	Member	Party
1894	Dugald Thomson	Free Trade
1895	Dugald Thomson	Free Trade
1898	Dugald Thomson	National Federal
1901	Ellison Quirk	Independent

== Election results ==
=== Elections in the 1900s ===
==== 1901 ====
1901 New South Wales state election: Warringah
Party	Candidate	Votes	%	±%
Independent	Ellison Quirk	739	34.7	
Independent Liberal	James Alderson	604	28.4	
Liberal Reform	James Conroy	490	23.0	−22.0
Independent Liberal	Thomas Loxton	296	13.9	
Total formal votes		2,129	100.0	+0.5
Informal votes		0	0.0	−0.5
Turnout		2,129	62.6	−3.3
Independent gain from Progressive				

The sitting member was Dugald Thomson (Progressive), (Note: Dugald Thomson had been elected as member of the Progressive party in 1898, then known as the National Federal party, described as a free trade federationist.) who did not contest the election as he had been elected in March 1901 as a Free Trade member for the federal seat of North Sydney.

=== Elections in the 1890s ===
==== 1898 ====
1898 New South Wales colonial election: Warringah
Party	Candidate	Votes	%	±%
National Federal	Dugald Thomson	805	55.0	
Free Trade	Tom Rolin	660	45.1	
Total formal votes		1,465	99.5	
Informal votes		7	0.5	
Turnout		1,472	65.9	
Member changed to National Federal from Free Trade				

==== 1895 ====
1895 New South Wales colonial election: Warringah
Party	Candidate	Votes	%	±%
Free Trade	Dugald Thomson	629	55.2	
Ind. Free Trade	Henry Moss	510	44.8	
Total formal votes		1,139	99.6	
Informal votes		5	0.4	
Turnout		1,144	66.2	
Free Trade hold				

==== 1894 ====
1894 New South Wales colonial election: Warringah
Party	Candidate	Votes	%	±%
Free Trade	Dugald Thomson	579	40.5	
Ind. Free Trade	Henry Moss	532	37.2	
Ind. Free Trade	Leonard Dodds	210	14.7	
Labour	Jonathan Lepherd	108	7.6	
Total formal votes		1,429	98.9	
Informal votes		16	1.1	
Turnout		1,445	82.5	
Free Trade win		(new seat)		
