= List of mayors of Warringah =

Mayor of Warringah Council
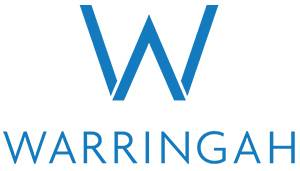
- Style: His/Her Worship
- Appointer: Warringah Council
- Term length: One Year (1906–2008) Four years (2008–2016)
- Formation: 14 June 1906 (as Shire President); 28 September 1993 (as Mayor)
- First holder: Cr. Thomas Fishbourne (Shire President); Cr. Brian Green (Mayor)
- Final holder: Cr. Michael Regan
- Abolished: 12 May 2016
- Deputy: Cr. Roslyn Harrison (Your Warringah)
- Website: www.warringah.nsw.gov.au

This is a list of the shire presidents, administrators and mayors of Warringah Council, a former local government area of New South Wales, Australia. The official title of Mayors while holding office was: His/Her Worship The Mayor of Warringah. First incorporated on 7 March 1906 as Warringah Shire Council, the council became known as Warringah Council on 1 July 1993 following the enactment of a new Local Government Act which also stipulated that the term 'Shire President' be replaced with 'Mayor'.

Upon its establishment a temporary council of five nominated representatives was installed. The first meeting of this temporary council took place in the Narrabeen Progress Hall on 19 June 1906, with George Brock in the chair. The election of the first Warringah Shire Council took place on 24 November 1906, and the first meeting of the six elected councillors took place on 3 December, when Thomas Fisbourne was elected Shire President. Originally a role nominated by the council annually, from 2008 to 2016 it was directly elected every four years. The last Mayor of Warringah was Councillor Michael Regan (Your Warringah), elected in 2008, who served until the council's amalgamation into the new Northern Beaches Council, which was established with former Warringah administrator, Dick Persson, at its head.

== Shire presidents and deputy shire presidents ==
| # | Term | Shire presidents | Deputy President | Term |
|---|---|---|---|---|
| – | 19 June 1906 – 3 December 1906 | George Brock (Provisional Chair) | | |
| 1 | 3 December 1906 – February 1908 | Thomas Fishbourne | | |
| 2 | February 1908 – 1 March 1910 | Alexander Ralston | | |
| 3 | 1 March 1910 – 1 March 1911 | Ellison Quirk | | |
| – | 1 March 1911 – 1 March 1912 | Alexander Ralston | | |
| 4 | 1 March 1912 – 1 March 1914 | William Hews | | |
| – | 1 March 1914 – 1 March 1915 | Ellison Quirk | | |
| 5 | 1 March 1915 – 1 March 1918 | John Duffy | | |
| – | 1 March 1918 – 1 March 1919 | Ellison Quirk | | |
| 6 | 1 March 1919 – December 1920 | Henry Lodge | | |
| 7 | December 1920 – December 1925 | Arthur George Parr | | |
| 8 | December 1925 – 1 March 1926 | Ramsay McKillop (ALP) | | |
| – | March 1926 – December 1927 | Arthur George Parr | | |
| 9 | December 1927 – December 1929 | Francis Frederick Corkery | | |
| 10 | December 1929 – December 1931 | George William Hitchcock | | |
| 11 | December 1931 – December 1933 | Charles Henry Sheppard | | |
| 12 | December 1933 – December 1935 | John Warwick Austin | Thomas Henry McPaul | December 1934 |
| 13 | December 1935 – December 1937 | Albert Henry Hughes | Charles Henry Sheppard | December 1935 |
| 13 | December 1935 – December 1937 | Albert Henry Hughes | T. A. Nicholas | December 1936 |
| 14 | December 1937 – December 1940 | George Green | T. A. Nicholas | December 1936 |
| 14 | December 1937 – December 1940 | George Green | Albert Sterland | December 1939 |
| 15 | December 1940 – December 1944 | Albert Sterland | T. A. Nicholas | December 1940/42 |
| 16 | December 1944 – December 1946 | Walter Harris | | |
| 17 | December 1946 – December 1948 | Wilfred Batho | | |
| 18 | December 1948 – December 1950 | Russell Kent | | |
| 19 | December 1950 – December 1951 | William Horn | | |
| 20 | December 1951 – 2 December 1957 | John Fisher | William Berry | December 1952 |
| 20 | December 1951 – 2 December 1957 | John Fisher | Leonard McKay | December 1954 |
| 21 | 2 December 1957 – December 1958 | William Berry | | |
| 22 | December 1958 – December 1959 | Herbert Cooper | | |
| – | December 1959 – December 1962 | William Berry | | |
| 23 | December 1962 – December 1963 | Edgar Wilson | | |
| 24 | December 1963 – December 1964 | Geoffrey Mill | | |
| 25 | December 1964 – 3 April 1967 | Gordon Jones | Donald Lindsay | December 1965 |
| – | 3 April 1967 – 5 November 1967 | Jack Barnett (Administrator) | N/A | |
| – | 6 November 1967 – 6 December 1968 | R. H. Cornish (Administrator) | N/A | |
| 26 | December 1968 – September 1971 | Colin Huntingdon | | |
| 27 | September 1971 – September 1974 | Richard Legg | | |
| 28 | September 1974 – September 1975 | Peter Dawson | | |
| 29 | September 1975 – September 1976 | Robert Creagh | Kevin Begaud | September 1975 |
| 30 | September 1976 – September 1977 | Desmond Sainsbery | Peter Dawson | September 1976 |
| 31 | September 1977 – 21 June 1978 | Kevin Begaud | Gavin Anderson | September 1977 |
| 32 | 21 June 1978 – 19 September 1979 | Gavin Anderson | Paul Couvret | 21 June 1978 |
| 33 | 19 September 1979 – 24 September 1983 | Paul Couvret | Richard Legg | 19 September 1979 |
| 33 | 19 September 1979 – 24 September 1983 | Paul Couvret | Mark Hummerston | September 1980 |
| 33 | 19 September 1979 – 24 September 1983 | Paul Couvret | Brian Green | September 1981 |
| 33 | 19 September 1979 – 24 September 1983 | Paul Couvret | John Bradford | September 1982 |
| 34 | 24 September 1983 – 24 September 1985 | Darren Jones | Kevin Begaud | September 1983 |
| 34 | 24 September 1983 – 24 September 1985 | Darren Jones | Brian Green | September 1984 |
| 35 | 24 September 1985 – 5 December 1985 | Ted Jackson | John Bradford | 24 September 1985 |
| – | 5 December 1985 – 21 April 1986 | Daniel Kelly (Administrator) | N/A | |
| – | 21 April 1986 – 24 March 1987 | Richard Conolly (Administrator) | N/A | |
| – | 24 March 1987 – 26 September 1989 | Ted Jackson | Mark Hummerston | 14 March 1987 |
| – | 24 March 1987 – 26 September 1989 | Ted Jackson | Julie Sutton | 29 September 1987 |
| – | 24 March 1987 – 26 September 1989 | Ted Jackson | Brian Green | 27 September 1988 |
| 36 | 26 September 1989 – 24 September 1991 | John Caputo | Julie Sutton | 26 September 1989 |
| 36 | 26 September 1989 – 24 September 1991 | John Caputo | Frank Beckman | 24 September 1990 |
| 37 | 24 September 1991 – 28 September 1993 | Brian Green | Andrew Humpherson | 24 September 1991 |
| 37 | 24 September 1991 – 28 September 1993 | Brian Green | Julie Sutton | June 1992 |

== Mayors and deputy mayors ==
| # | Term | Mayor | Deputy Mayor | Term |
|---|---|---|---|---|
| – | 28 September 1993 – 19 September 1995 | Brian Green | Sam Danieli | 28 September 1993 |
| – | 28 September 1993 – 19 September 1995 | Brian Green | Julie Sutton | 20 September 1994 |
| 38 | 19 September 1995 – 24 September 1996 | Julie Sutton | Sam Danieli | 19 September 1995 |
| 39 | 24 September 1996 – 22 September 1998 | Sam Danieli | Tom Webster | 24 September 1996 |
| 39 | 24 September 1996 – 22 September 1998 | Sam Danieli | Peter Moxham | 23 September 1997 |
| – | 22 September 1998 – 23 September 1999 | John Caputo | Liz Jones | 22 September 1998 |
| 40 | 23 September 1999 – 27 September 2001 | Peter Moxham | Phil Colman | 23 September 1999 |
| 40 | 23 September 1999 – 27 September 2001 | Peter Moxham | Darren Jones | 26 September 2000 |
| – | 27 September 2001 – 26 September 2002 | Darren Jones | Julie Sutton | 27 September 2001 |
| – | 26 September 2002 – 23 July 2003 | Julie Sutton | David Stephens | 26 September 2002 |
| – | 23 July 2003 – 13 September 2008 | Dick Persson (Administrator) | N/A | |
| 41 | 13 September 2008 – 12 May 2016 | Michael Regan | Dr. Conny Harris | 14 October 2008 |
| 41 | 13 September 2008 – 12 May 2016 | Michael Regan | Michelle Ray | 13 October 2009 |
| 41 | 13 September 2008 – 12 May 2016 | Michael Regan | Julie Sutton | 30 September 2011 |
| 41 | 13 September 2008 – 12 May 2016 | Michael Regan | Bob Giltinan | 23 October 2012 |
| 41 | 13 September 2008 – 12 May 2016 | Michael Regan | Sue Heins | 24 September 2013 |
| 41 | 13 September 2008 – 12 May 2016 | Michael Regan | Jose Menano-Pires | 23 September 2014 |
| 41 | 13 September 2008 – 12 May 2016 | Michael Regan | Roslyn Harrison | 25 August 2015 |

== Shire clerks and general managers ==
The Local Government Act, 1993 removed the requirement that the administrative head of a council be a "Town or Shire Clerk" and specified that the head was to be known as the "General Manager". Warringah Council had previously recognised the changing nature of role in appointing the last two Shire Clerks as "General Managers" and delegating wider authorities to them, which lasted from 1984 to 5 May 1993.

| Years | Shire Clerk/General Manager |
|---|---|
| 21 June 1906 – 1907 | William S. Miller (Temporary) |
| 1907 – November 1913 | Patrick Carew |
| November 1913 – 20 November 1945 | Robert George Jamieson |
| 18 December 1945 – 14 November 1950 | Walter Gors |
| 19 November 1950 – 28 January 1952 | Norman Hubbard |
| 4 May 1952 – 21 January 1970 | James Morgan BEM |
| 24 January 1970 – 22 July 1980 | Rex Stuckey |
| 4 July 1980 – 6 July 1984 | Glen Riordan |
| 30 July 1984 – 29 September 1985 | Patrick Hynes |
| 22 October 1985 – April 1998 | Len Thomson |
| May 1998 – October 2001 | Denis Smith |
| 11 February 2002 – 15 March 2007 | Stephen Blackadder |
| 15 March 2007 – 12 May 2016 | Rik Hart |

== Notable office-holders ==
Notable presidents/deputy presidents and mayors/deputy mayors include:

- Frank Beckman (1923–2017): Councillor 1962–1967, 1968–1985, 1987–1991, Deputy Shire President 1990–1991, Mackellar County Councillor 1969–1979. In 2001 he was awarded the Centenary Medal for "service to the community through local government".
- John Bradford: Councillor 1977–1985, Deputy Shire President 1982–1983, 1985, Councillor Mackellar County Council 1977–1979 (Deputy Chair, 1979), Member of the Federal Parliament for McPherson 1990–1998.
- John Caputo: Councillor 1987–2003, Shire President 1989–1991, Mayor 1998–1999. In 2000 he was awarded the Medal of the Order of Australia (OAM) for "service to the Italian community, to the community of Warringah, and to local government."
- Paul Couvret: Shire President 1979–1983, Councillor 1973–1995. In 1998 he was awarded a Medal of the Order of Australia (OAM) "for service to local government through the Warringah Shire Council, to veterans, and to the community".
- Brian Green: Councillor 1980–1999, Shire President 1991–1993, Mayor 1993–1995. In 2001 he was awarded the Centenary Medal for "service as former mayor and for active service to the community and local government".
- Bob Giltinan: Councillor 2008–2016, Deputy Mayor 2012–2013, former professional international tennis player.
- Andrew Humpherson: Councillor 1987–1992, Deputy Shire President 1991–1992, State Member for Davidson 1992–2007.
- Ted Jackson (1921–2009): Councillor 1983–1991, Shire President 1985–1986, 1986–1989. Jackson later served as President of the Dee Why RSL Club for 23 years. On 31 May 1956 he received the British Empire Medal (BEM) for services to the Australian Army. In 1987 he was awarded the Australia Day RSL Achievement Award. On 11 June 1990 he received the Medal of the Order of Australia (OAM) for his "services to veterans & their families". In 2001 he was also awarded the Centenary Medal for services to veterans and Rotary's Community Service Award in 2002.
- Arthur George Parr (1876–1931): Councillor (B Riding) 31 January 1920 – 1931, Shire President 1920–1925, 1926–1927. Responsible for completion of Warringah public lighting and electrification; second-longest-serving mayor or shire president.
- Ellison Quirk: Manly Municipality Alderman 1896–1928, Mayor 1901–1906, Warringah Shire Councillor 1906–1922, Shire President 1910, 1913–1914, 1918–1919. State Member for Warringah 1901–1904.
- Desmond Sainsbery: Councillor 1968–1977, Shire President 1976–1977. In 1993 he was awarded the Medal of the Order of Australia (OAM) for "service to youth and to sport in Warringah Shire."
- Julie Sutton: Councillor 1980–1985, 1987–2003, 2008–2012, was the first and only female Mayor from 1995–1996 and 2002–2003.
- Tom Webster: State Member for Wakehurst 1978–1984, Councillor 1991–1999, Deputy Mayor 1996–1997.

Other notable councillors, who did not hold office as President/Mayor or Deputy President/Deputy Mayor are:

- Jason Falinski: B Ward Councillor 2008–2012, Member of the Federal Parliament for Mackellar 2016–date.
- Walter Cresswell O'Reilly: Chief Commonwealth Film Censor 1928–1942, Mayor of Ku-ring-gai 1929–1933, D Riding Warringah Councillor 1939–1941.

== Election results ==
=== 2012 ===
2012 New South Wales mayoral elections: Warringah
| Party | Candidate | Votes | % | ±% |
|---|---|---|---|---|
| Your Warringah | Michael Regan | 41,161 | 56.3 | +36.7 |
| Independent Liberal | Pat Daley | 12,935 | 17.7 | +17.7 |
| Independent | Vincent De Luca | 9,756 | 13.4 | +6.4 |
| Greens | Conny Harris | 9,222 | 12.6 | −1.6 |
| Total formal votes | | 32,800 | 94.4 | |
| Informal votes | | 1,959 | 5.6 | |
| Turnout | | 34,759 | | |
| Your Warringah hold | | Swing | +36.7 | |
