= Bob Giltinan =

Australian tennis player

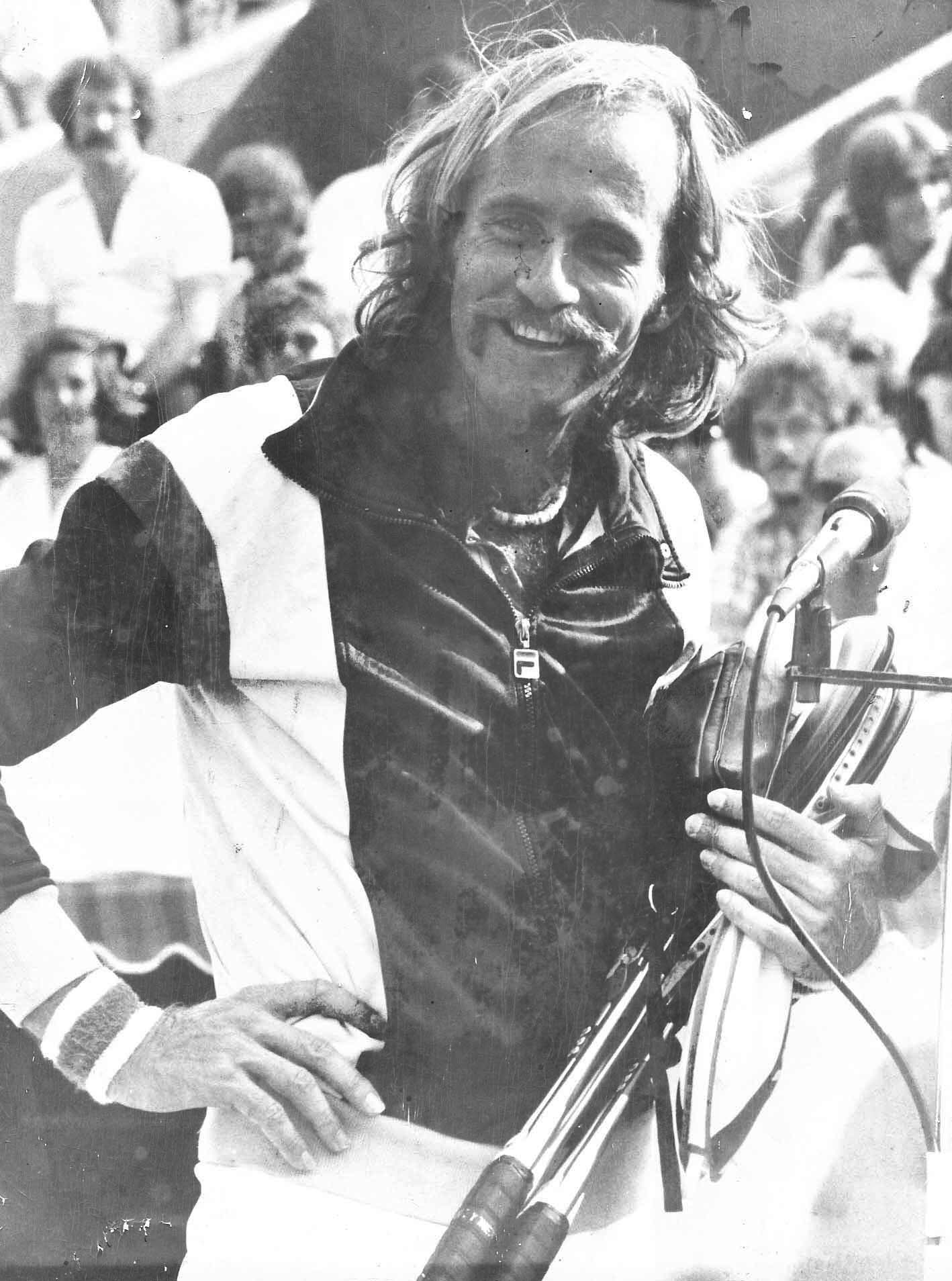
- Country (sports): Australia
- Residence: Sydney, New South Wales
- Born: 4 July 1949 (age 77) Sydney, New South Wales
- Height: 1.85 m (6 ft 1 in)
- Plays: Right-handed

Singles
- Career record: 66–95
- Career titles: 1
- Highest ranking: No. 16 (1974)

Grand Slam singles results
- Australian Open: SF (1977^{Dec})
- French Open: 2R (1968, 1978)
- Wimbledon: 2R (1970, 1973, 1974, 1978)
- US Open: 1R (1978)

Doubles
- Career record: 64–78
- Career titles: 2

Grand Slam doubles results
- Australian Open: F (1973)
- French Open: 4R (1968)
- Wimbledon: 4R (1974)
- US Open: 3R (1978)

Grand Slam mixed doubles results
- Australian Open: 1R (1969)

Team competitions
- Davis Cup: W (1973, 1977)

Councillor of Warringah Council for B Ward
- In office 13 September 2008 – 12 May 2016

Deputy Mayor of Warringah
- In office 23 October 2012 – 24 September 2013
- Mayor: Michael Regan
- Preceded by: Julie Sutton
- Succeeded by: Sue Heins

Councillor of Northern Beaches Council for Narrabeen Ward
- In office 02 October 2024 – Current

Personal details
- Party: Independent

Robert Gary Giltinan OAM (born 4 July 1949) is an Australian former professional tennis player who was a grass court specialist. He won one singles title and two doubles titles over a twelve-year career spanning the introduction of the open era in 1968 to 1979. He reached a career-high ranking of World No. 16.

Giltinan is a direct relative of notable Australian entrepreneur James Joseph Giltinan (J J Giltinan), who helped found the sport of rugby league football in Australia, and also what is now effectively the world championships for 18 ft skiff class yachts, the JJ Giltinan International Trophy, contested each year on Sydney Harbour.

== Tennis career ==
Beginning his tennis career in the 1960s, it was halted for two years when he completed National Service with the Australian Army during the Vietnam War.

He won one singles title at Surbiton in 1974, defeating Syd Ball in straight sets, and reached the final of Newport in 1973, falling to Roger Taylor of Great Britain 8–9 6–8. Giltinan was a member of the winning 1973 and 1977 Australian Davis Cup squads. He also represented the Cleveland Nets in World Team Tennis during the 1970s, partnering Björn Borg, Marty Riessen and Martina Navratilova. During the team's only season as the Cleveland-Pittsburgh Nets in 1977, he was the radio play-by-play voice on WWWE instead of being an active player.

Giltinan is best known for his run into the singles semi-finals of the 1977 Australian Open as a qualifier, where he would lose to John Lloyd of Great Britain. This run matches the best performance of any male qualifier in a Grand Slam. His other notable singles Grand Slam performance was his loss to John Alexander in four sets in the quarter-finals of the 1973 Australian Open.

Giltinan's best Grand Slam doubles forays include a three set loss with Syd Ball to Ross Case and Geoff Masters in the 1973 Australian Open final, after defeating the far more famous pairing of Roche/Newcombe in three sets in the semi-finals. He and Syd Ball also reached the 1970 Australian Open semi-finals, falling to John Alexander and Phil Dent in four sets.

Giltinan won 2 doubles titles in his career. In 1978, he and Colin Dibley defeated Marcelo Lara and Eliot Teltscher at the 1978 Columbus Open in straight sets. Unlike his other titles, this was on clay. In 1979, Giltinan and Phil Dent defeated Ion Țiriac and Guillermo Vilas in the final of Hobart. Also notable is their defeat of Mark Edmondson and John Marks in the semi-finals.

Aside from the finals at the Australian Open, Giltinan reached one other doubles final. In 1978, he and Colin Dibley were defeated by Tim Gullikson and Tom Gullikson at Newport.

== Later life ==
On 28 July 2000, Giltinan was awarded the Australian Sports Medal for service as a "Previous player, coach and manager of elite players. Has been NSW state coach and national selector". He was also awarded the Australian Defence Medal.

In September 2008, Giltinan stood as an independent candidate for B Ward (Comprising Manly Vale, Seaforth, Freshwater and Curl Curl) of Warringah Council for a four-year term and was elected on 13 September 2008 with 21.2% of the ward vote (the highest of the nine tickets). He was re-elected to B Ward at the 2012 local government elections on 8 September 2012 with 25.1% of the vote (the second-highest of six tickets), after which he was elected Deputy Mayor for a single term (2012–2013).

With the amalgamation of Warringah Council into Northern Beaches Council on 12 May 2016, Giltinan ceased being a Councillor but was appointed by Administrator Dick Persson to serve on one of the advisory committees set up from former Councillors to advise the new Council. In 2017, Giltinan announced his independent ticket for the Curl Curl Ward of Northern Beaches Council. At the first elections for the council on 9 September 2017, Giltinan's ticket, the only non-registered political party ticket, received 12% of the vote in Curl Curl Ward (the lowest of the five ward tickets) and was not elected.

On 10 June 2019, Giltinan was awarded the Medal of the Order of Australia (OAM) for "service to tennis, and to the community of the Northern Beaches".

On 14 September 2024, Giltinan stood alongside Vincent De Luca OAM and Tammy Cook as independent candidates for Narrabeen Ward of Northern Beaches Council. Vincent De Luca OAM (lead candidate) and Giltinan were elected for a four year term with 53.5% of the ward vote (the highest of the three tickets).

== Career titles ==
=== Singles (1) ===
Result	W/L	Date	Tournament	Surface	Opponent	Score
Win	1–0	Jun 1974	Surbiton, UK	Grass	(Australia) Syd Ball	6–3, 6–2

=== Doubles (2) ===
Result	W/L	Date	Tournament	Surface	Partner	Opponents	Score
Win	1–0	Aug 1978	Columbus, U.S.	Clay	(Australia) Colin Dibley	(United States) Eliot Teltscher (Mexico) Marcelo Lara	6–2, 6–3
Win	2–0	Jan 1979	Hobart, Australia	Grass	(Australia) Phil Dent	(Romania) Ion Țiriac (Argentina) Guillermo Vilas	8–6

== Honours and awards ==
Australian Sports Medal
Australian Defence Medal
Order of Australia Medal

Civic offices
Preceded by Julie Sutton	Deputy Mayor of Warringah; 2012 – 2013	Succeeded by Sue Heins
