= Oxford Falls Peace Park =

Park in New South Wales, Australia

Coordinates: 33°44′23″S 151°14′41″E

Oxford Falls Peace Park is a park in Oxford Falls, New South Wales, Australia, a suburb of Sydney.

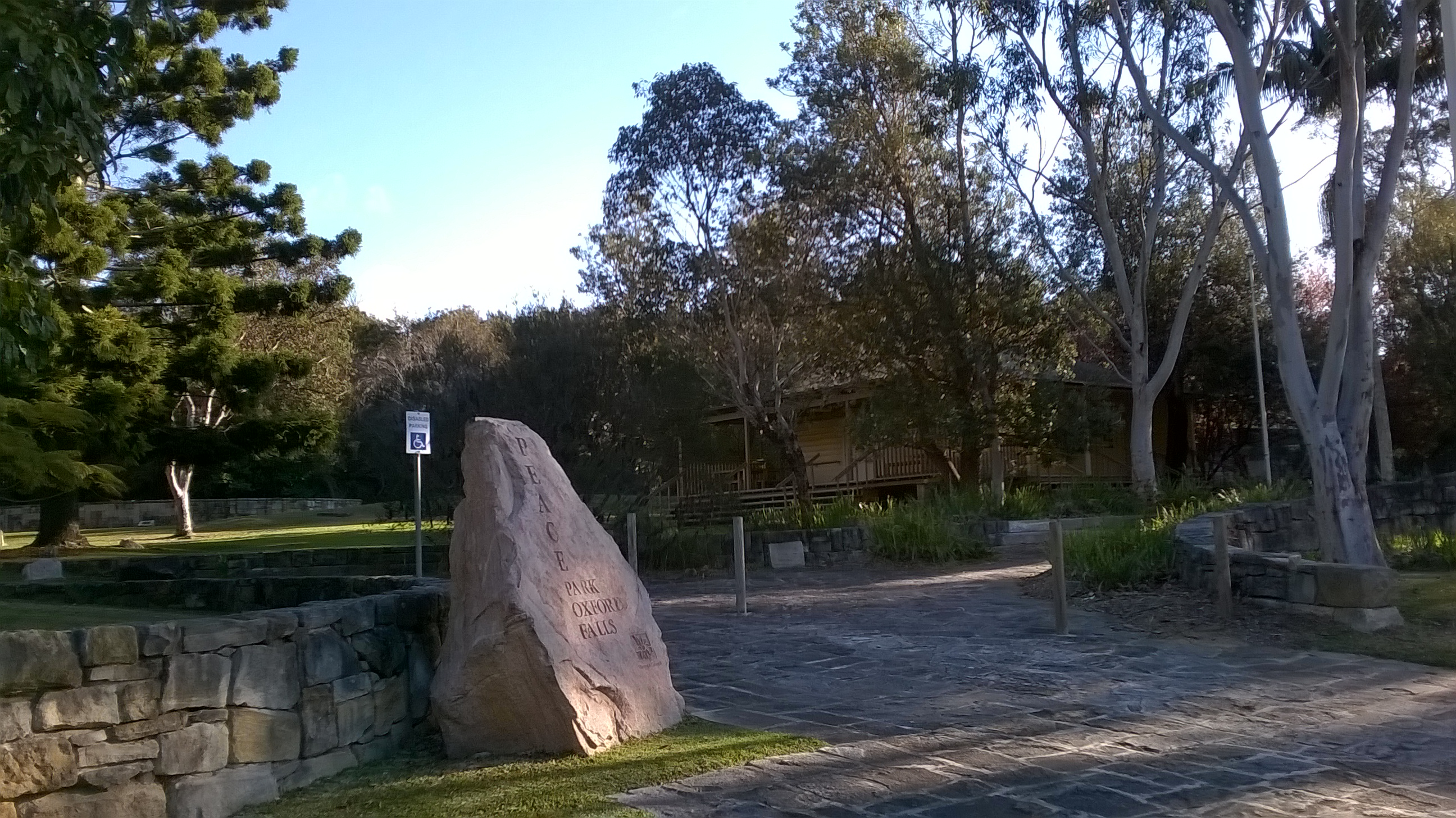
Oxford Falls Peace Park

== Community uses ==
The park is the home to Northern Beaches Council's ANZAC Day ceremonies. It is also home to many celebrations and services throughout the year. Oxford Falls Grammar School, across the road from the Peace Park, often provides bands to play commemorative music on these special days.

== History ==
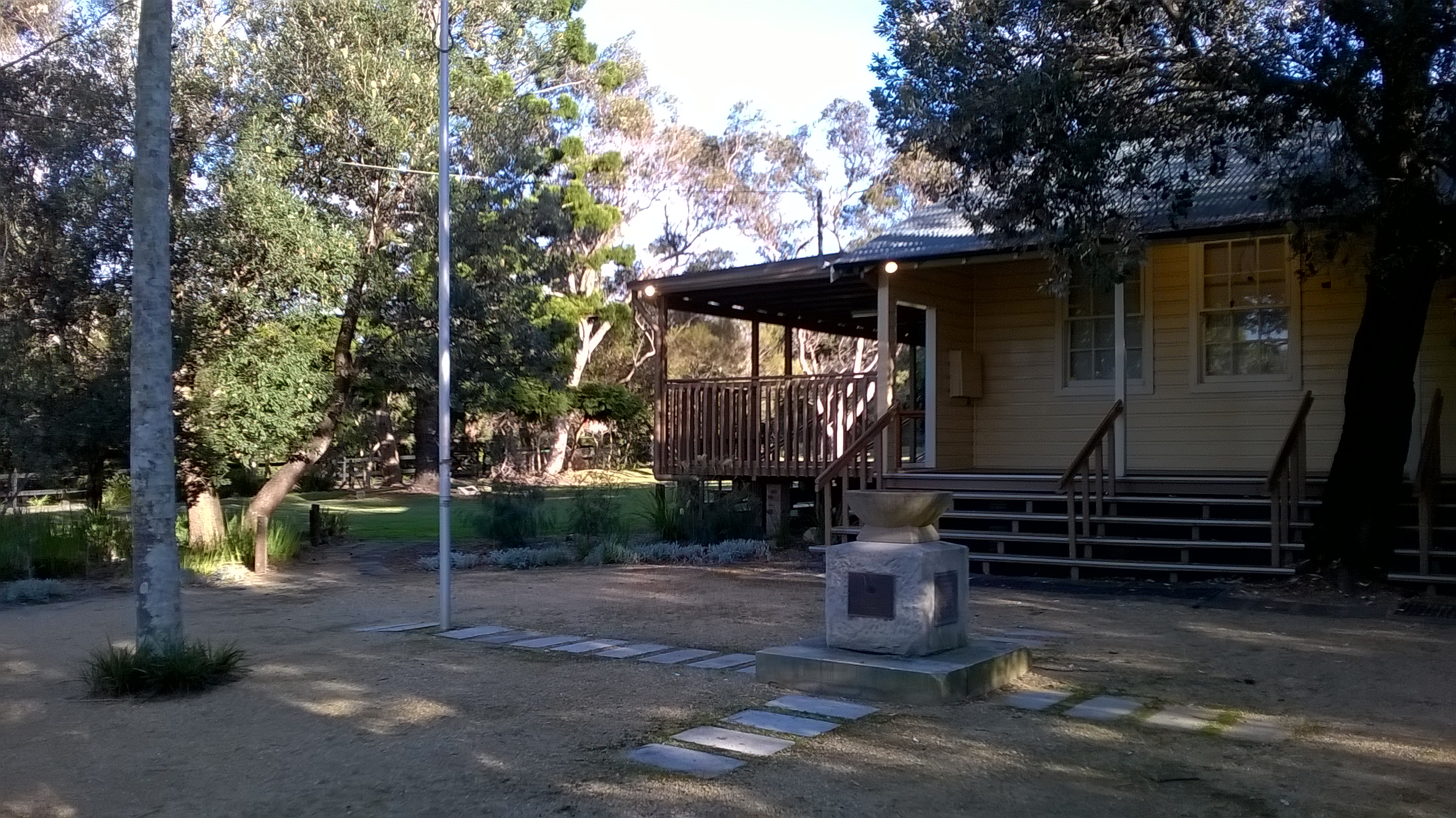
Oxford Falls Peace Park Memorial and old school building

The Oxford Falls Public School first opened in the small Church of England at Oxford Falls in 1928 with eight enrolments. The present building on the Peace Park site was built in 1930. With the school's closure in 1986, the schoolhouse was threatened with demolition but with the assistance of a local campaign and the support of Warringah Council, including the local councillor Paul Couvret, the peace park was created and the school now serves as a community hall and is the site of the annual ANZAC Day dawn service.

== Memorial/Frieze Wall ==
The wall surrounding the still centre has various bits of history on it.
