= Julie Sutton =

Julie Sutton may refer to:

- Julie Sutton (mayor) (born 1937), Australian politician, mayor of Warringah
- Julie Sutton (curler), Canadian curler
