= Voices of War =

Book by Michael Caulfield

Voices of war: Australians tell their stories from World War I to the present.
- Author: Michael Caulfield
- Language: English
- Genre: Military History, History
- Publisher: Hachette
- Publication date: 2006
- Publication place: Australia
- Media type: Print (Paperback)
- Pages: 541
- ISBN: 978-0-7336-2237-3

Voices of War: Australians tell their stories from World War I to the present (2006) is a telling of the oral history of the Australian experience of war edited by Michael Caulfield. It is made up of 21 firsthand accounts of Australians involvement with war, from the First World War through to the Iraq War.

The stories are taken from the 2000 histories recorded by the Australians at War Film Archive.

== Accounts ==
- Patrick Toovey - (Second World War)
- Arpad 'Paddy' Macskai - (Second World War), (Malayan Emergency), (Vietnam War)
- Dulcie Toohey - (Second World War)
- Peter Warfe - (Rwanda)
- Arthur 'Nat' Gould - (Second World War)
- Iris Roser - (Second World War), (Vietnam War)
- Frank McGovern - (Second World War)
- Barry Seeley - (Malayan Emergency), (Borneo Confrontation), (Vietnam War)
- Dr Geoff Cornish - (Second World War)
- Ted Kenna - (Second World War) - Winner of the Victoria Cross
- Norman Cameron - (Vietnam War)
- Wendy Trevor - (Second World War)
- Walter Wallace - (Second World War)
- Keith Payne - (Second World War) - Winner of the Victoria Cross
- Paul Couvret - (Second World War)
- John Fraser - (United Nations Transitional Authority in Cambodia), (International Force for East Timor)
- Noel 'Peter' Medcalfe - (Second World War)
- Adele Manchoulas - (Second World War)
- Salvatore Andaloro - (United Nations Mission for the Referendum in Western Sahara), (East Timor)
- Garth Fitzgerald - (East Timor), (Iraq War)
- Ted Smout - (First World War)
