= Michael Caulfield =

Australian writer, director, producer and composer

Michael Caulfield is an Australian writer, director, producer and composer. He is known for his interest in military history. He composed and sang the main theme song of The Lost Islands television series, which was broadcast in 1976. He produced the eight-hour television series Australians at War, which was broadcast in 2001. This led to the establishment of the Australians at War Film Archive, which eventually recorded the stories of over 2000 Australians and their experiences with war. From this, 21 stories were presented in written form in the book Voices of War, edited by Caulfield.
