= Michael Regan (Australian politician) =

Australian politician (born 1973)

Michael Regan MP
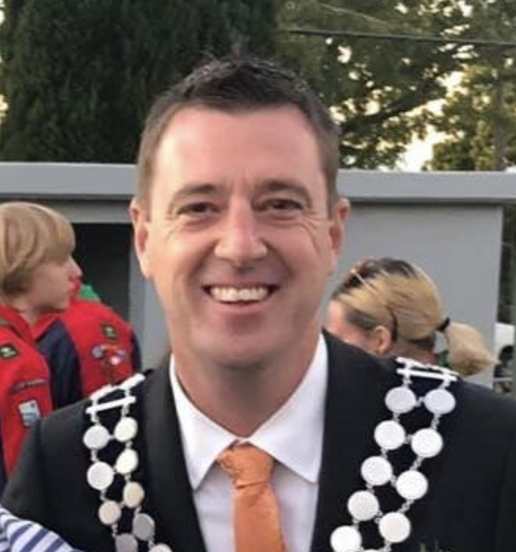
- Regan in 2021

Member of the New South Wales Legislative Assembly for Wakehurst
- Incumbent
- Assumed office 25 March 2023
- Preceded by: Brad Hazzard

Councillor of Northern Beaches Council
- In office 9 September 2017 – 14 September 2024
- Succeeded by: Jody Williams
- Constituency: Curl Curl Ward (2017–2021); Frenchs Forest Ward (2021–2024)

1st Mayor of Northern Beaches Council
- In office 26 September 2017 – 16 May 2023
- Deputy: See list: Candy Bingham Sue Heins Candy Bingham Sue Heins
- Preceded by: Dick Persson (Administrator)
- Succeeded by: Sue Heins

41st Mayor of Warringah Council
- In office 13 September 2008 – 12 May 2016
- Deputy: See list: Conny Harris Michelle Ray Julie Sutton Bob Giltinan Sue Heins Jose Menano-Pires Roslyn Harrison
- Preceded by: Dick Persson (administrator)
- Succeeded by: Council abolished

Personal details
- Born: 1973 (age 52–53) Auburn, Sydney, Australia
- Party: Independent
- Other political affiliations: Wake Up Warringah (2008–2012); Your Warringah (2012–2017); Your Northern Beaches Independent Team (2017–present)
- Education: Holroyd High School; Meadowbank TAFE College
- Profession: Public servant
- Website: www.michaelreganmp.com

Michael John Regan (born 1973) is an Australian politician who has been the member for Wakehurst in the New South Wales Legislative Assembly since 2023.

He was previously the Mayor of Warringah Council from 13 September 2008 until May 2016 following its amalgamation into the Northern Beaches Council. In September 2017, Regan was elected as the first Mayor of Northern Beaches Council, holding office until May 2023. His seat of Wakehurst covers a large portion of the area of Northern Beaches Council.

== Early life and career ==
Regan grew up in Western Sydney, born at Auburn Hospital in 1973 and spending his early years in Merrylands and Greystanes. After leaving Holroyd High School in year 11, Regan first worked as a check-out assistant and later a trainee store manager for Kmart Australia. In 1990, Regan took up as position at the City of Sydney as a clerk in the Engineer's Department, before leaving the council as Street Cleansing and Waste Manager in 2001. He also worked as Cleaning Manager for Telstra Stadium, Team Leader Customer Service at Lane Cove Council and then as a manager for Manly Council from 2005 to 2009.

== Mayor of Warringah ==
Wake Up Warringah/Your Warringah Party Warringah Council seats
- 2008 Election: 4 / 10
- 2012 Election: 6 / 10

Regan was elected as mayor at the election on 13 September 2008 with 19.6% of the vote which meant that his ticket votes in C Ward flowed on to elect a councillor, while Wake Up Warringah candidates won a seat on A Ward and B Ward. Regan's main platform for election was to run "Council as a ‘Board of Directors’" to expunge the council's previous reputation for infighting and to encourage the better management of council. In August 2012, Regan and his wife Bronwen, gained attention over a council code-of-conduct matter where a fellow councillor had launched into a tirade at the mayoress in the councillors lounge in the Civic Centre following a council meeting.

At the 2012 New South Wales local elections, Regan stood again for mayor and C Ward Councillor under the newly renamed "Your Warringah" ticket. Regan was re-elected as mayor with 56.3% of the vote and his ticket in C Ward took 60% of the vote, enough to elect two councillors on his personal ticket. Your Warringah candidates also took two seats in A Ward and one seat in B Ward to make six seats for his party on the council.

In March 2014, Regan's administration of council was criticised for maintaining a $1.7 million council car budget which included a Jaguar XF as the mayoral car, while requesting a 24 per-cent rate rise over four years. October 2014, Regan replaced this car with an eco-friendly Mitsubishi Outlander PHEV. In June 2014, the Independent and Regulatory Pricing Tribunal (IPART) rejected the requested special rate variation of 26.2%, but permitted an increase of 19.7%.

In December 2014, Regan led a push within council to pass a motion to support a merger proposal of Warringah with Pittwater and Manly Councils to form a Northern Beaches council: "It would mean better value for rate payers and better ability to plan for the entire region. Concerns about loss of local representation are a red herring – as this can be maintained, and even increased, depending on the governance model that is adopted. I call upon our neighbours to support the recommendation for the creation of a new northern beaches council for our community."

In March 2015, Regan passed through a proposal in the council to lease council land at Dee Why for affordable housing, despite a staff report that noted that it would not provide the best financial return. Regan argued that it was intended to be provided for nurses, teachers and police who often had large commuting times to the region as they could not afford to live in the area, and that the social benefits could not be underestimated. In October 2015, Warringah Council was awarded by Local Government NSW the A. R. Bluett Memorial Award, which recognises the best-performing council in the state, an acknowledgment of the work of the council under Regan and council staff: "Warringah Council’s submission highlights included excellent infrastructure renewal programs, high resident satisfaction, a sound financial position, a range of organisational improvements, staff engagement and professional development, collaboration with community groups and other organisations, an active youth program, art and cultural projects, environmental and planning initiatives, and specific community infrastructure such as the Narrabeen Lagoon Trail, Collaroy All Abilities Playground and Forestville Sporting Facilities."

== Northern Beaches Council ==
Your Northern Beaches Independent Team Council seats
- 2017 Election: 6 / 15
- 2021 Election: 6 / 15

On 12 May 2016, with the release of the Local Government (Council Amalgamations) Proclamation 2016, the Northern Beaches Council was formed as per Warringah's submission, from Manly, Pittwater and Warringah councils. At the first meeting of the new council at Manly Town Hall on 19 May, Regan was appointed, with Manly mayor Jean Hay and Pittwater Deputy Mayor Kylie Ferguson, by Administrator Dick Persson as a member of the Implementation Advisory Group, one of several advisory committees composed of former councillors and mayors of the three councils, and as Chair of the Economic Committee.

In early 2017, Regan announced that he had registered a successor to his "Your Warringah" team in anticipation of running for the council elections scheduled for September 2017. The "Your Northern Beaches Independent Team" would field 15 candidates, with Regan expressing interest in serving as mayor. Regan has supported changing the mayoral position to a directly elected one, following the system when he was Warringah mayor. At the council election on 9 September 2017, Regan was elected in the first position as a Councillor for Curl Curl Ward, while five other Your Northern Beaches councillors were elected including former deputy Roslyn Harrison in Frenchs Forest Ward, whose personal vote was enough to elect a second councillor, Penny Philpott, former deputy Sue Heins in Narrabeen Ward, former Pittwater Deputy Mayor Ian White in Pittwater Ward, and Sarah Grattan in Manly Ward. The campaign leading up to the election was marked by several attempts by the Liberal Party to smear independent candidates, which Regan labelled "gutter politics": "It is a sad day when they try to bring this into a local government election. Frankly, the community is over negative politics, which is why they are unresponsive to politicians in general. It is not parliament. There is no opposition leader. We are supposed to be here for the community."

At the council meeting held at Dee Why Civic Centre on 26 September 2017, Regan was elected as the first Mayor of Northern Beaches Council for a two-year term, alongside Deputy Mayor Candy Bingham. He was re-elected for a second term on 24 September 2019 and a third term on 28 September 2021. From October 2017 to October 2019, Regan was a Board Director of Local Government NSW.

At the second Northern Beaches Council election held on 4 December 2021, the Your Northern Beaches Independent Team ran a full list of candidates, with Regan moving ward from Curl Curl to Frenchs Forest Ward. Regan and the Your Northern Beaches Independent Team successfully defended all six incumbent seats at the election with a swing of +1.4%. In October 2022, Northern Beaches Council was awarded the A. R. Bluett Memorial Award by Local Government NSW, which recognises the best-performing councils in the state in the previous year, with Regan noting: "Since amalgamation we have had a huge focus on repairing and renewing ailing infrastructure, delivering long term financial stability and putting the community at the centre of everything we do. It hasn’t been easy but this award recognises the hard work and dedication of both the elected Council and our incredible staff to deliver great outcomes for our community." The chair of the award trustees, Les McMahon, also noted that the Council had "led its community through a number of challenges including the ongoing COVID-19 pandemic and unprecedented wet weather events. Despite the challenges, Northern Beaches Council was still able to deliver a $76 million capital works program, with a focus on resilient and sustainable infrastructure, while also undertaking a comprehensive community services program to assist all members of its community".

== State politics ==
In January 2023, Regan announced that he would run as an Independent candidate for the NSW Legislative Assembly seat of Wakehurst at the March 2023 state election, which was a safe Liberal seat held by the retiring Minister for Health, Brad Hazzard, since 1991. Regan noted that the decision of the NSW Government-appointed planning panel to approve a planning proposal for a large 450-dwelling residential subdivision in an area of native bushland known as "Lizard Rock" in Belrose, despite the loss of native bushland and housing development in a bushfire-prone area that it represented, encouraged him to stand on a platform that included advocating for sustainable development.

On 25 March 2023, Regan was successful in his campaign to win the seat, gaining a 2CP swing of 27.2%, becoming only the second non-Liberal and the first independent candidate to win the seat. On his election, Regan announced that he would advocate for "gambling reform, integrity in politics and rebates for solar panels, as well as issues that were close to the hearts of his constituents on the Northern Beaches: roads, buses and the mental health services at Northern Beaches Hospital." He delivered his inaugural speech as an MP on 10 May 2023.

As an elected member of Parliament, Regan is permitted to retain his offices as mayor and councillor of Northern Beaches Council "for the balance of the person’s term of office as a councillor or for the period of 2 years (whichever is the shorter period)" in accordance with Section 275(5) of the Local Government Act, 1993, a requirement which came into effect following the passage of the Local Government Amendment (Members of Parliament) Act, 2012. On 16 May 2023, Regan resigned as mayor, but announced his intention to remain as a councillor for the rest of the Council term. His term as councillor ended at the local government elections in September 2024.

Civic offices
Preceded by Dick Persson as Administrator	Mayor of Warringah Council; 2008–2016	Council abolished
Preceded by Dick Persson as Administrator	Mayor of Northern Beaches Council; 2017–2023	Succeeded by Sue Heins
New South Wales Legislative Assembly
Preceded by Brad Hazzard	Member for Wakehurst; 2023–present	Incumbent
