= Holroyd High School =

Location
- Greystanes, New South Wales; Australia; 33°50′00″S 150°57′02″E

Information
- Type: Public, secondary, co-educational, day school
- Motto: Latin: Progrediamur (Let us go forward)
- Established: January 1967
- Principal: Kylie Adams
- Campus: Cumberland Road
- Colours: Green and red
- Website: HHS website

Holroyd High School, (abbreviation HHS) is a co-educational public high school located in Greystanes, a suburb in Sydney, Australia. It is operated by the New South Wales Department of Education with students from Years 7 to 12. The school was established in 1968.

Sixty percent of the students have a refugee background, and eighty-eight percent have English as a second language.

== Friends of Zainab Trust Fund ==
When Zainab Kaabi, a refugee from Iran, who spent two years living in Australia, had her temporary protection visa benefits cut, the school's principal, Dorothy Hoddinott, set up a trust fund to support her financially so that she was able to complete her education. She kickstarted the fund with her own personal finances and over time invited more people to contribute. In 2008, Hoddinott was made an officer of the Order of Australia in recognition of her work with the Friends of Zainab Trust fund.

The trust fund now helps a considerable number of students who are refugees.

== Notable alumni ==
- Chris Bath – presenter of 10 News First
- Michael Regan – mayor of Northern Beaches Council
