= Paul Couvret =

Dutch–Australian politician (1922–2013)

Paul Couvret OAM JP

33rd Shire President of Warringah
- In office 19 September 1979 – 24 September 1983
- Deputy: Richard Legg; Mark Hummerston; Brian Green; John Bradford
- Preceded by: Gavin Anderson
- Succeeded by: Darren Jones

Deputy Shire President of Warringah
- In office 21 June 1978 – 19 September 1979
- President: Gavin Anderson
- Preceded by: Gavin Anderson
- Succeeded by: Richard Legg

Councillor on Warringah Council
- In office 24 February 1973 – 4 December 1985
- Preceded by: Thomas Farrell
- Constituency: B Riding/D Riding
- In office 14 March 1987 – 9 September 1995
- Succeeded by: Liz Jones
- Constituency: D Riding/C Ward

Personal details
- Born: 5 June 1922 Batavia, Dutch East Indies
- Died: 5 July 2013 (aged 91) Belrose, New South Wales, Australia
- Party: Independent
- Spouse: Hilja Seltam
- Children: Paul Couvret; Thomas Andrew Couvret; Michael Anthony Couvret; Christopher Mark Couvret
- Relatives: Jake Couvret (grand-child); Jasmine Couvret (grand-child); Bradley Couvret (grand-child); Melissa Couvret (grand-child); Gemma Couvret (grand-child); Nick Couvret (grand-child); Genevieve Couvret (grand-child); Harry Couvret (grand-child); Lockyer Couvret (grand-child); Max Couvret (grand-child)
- Occupation: Teacher
- Awards: OAM; Centenary Medal; Knight of the Order of Orange-Nassau

Military service
- Allegiance: Netherlands
- Branch/service: Royal Netherlands East Indies Army; Royal Netherlands Navy
- Years of service: 1941 – 1947
- Rank: Pilot Officer
- Unit: Netherlands Naval Aviation Service
- Battles/wars: World War II

Paul Couvret (5 June 1922 – 5 July 2013) was a Dutch–Australian military veteran, New South Wales schoolteacher and local Councillor. He was a Councillor on Warringah Council from 1973 to 1995 and was Shire President from 1979 to 1983.

== Early life and background ==
Couvret was born in June 1922 in Batavia, the capital of the Dutch East Indies, the son of Paul Couvret, an accountant, and Anne-Marie, a trained nurse. When World War II came to the Netherlands in 1940, Couvret signed up to the Royal Netherlands Navy but by the time the East Indies were invaded by the Empire of Japan, he was taken prisoner during service in the Indian Ocean on 8 March 1942, aged 20. He was subsequently transported to Nagasaki on board the Asama Maru in October 1942, where he spent the rest of the war. On 9 August 1945, Couvret was working in a sunken dock in Nagasaki Harbour when an atom bomb exploded six kilometres away. He dived under the ship he had been working on and was thus protected from the explosion.

=== Immigration to Australia ===
Upon being liberated by sailors of the US Navy on 11 September 1945, Couvret returned to service with the Dutch Navy, this time as a pilot in the Netherlands Naval Aviation Service. His father had died in a Japanese prison in Bandoeng and his mother had died of starvation in a nearby women's camp. Therefore, at the end of 1945 he came to Australia for six months to assist with the evacuation of prisoners of war from the East. Couvret was eventually demobilised in July 1947 and then repatriated to the Netherlands. However, he decided to return to Australia, arriving in Sydney on the SS Volendam in January 1949, aged 27.

Couvret eventually settled in the rural town of Cowra, New South Wales, becoming a Primary School teacher at the Cowra Migrant Centre, where he met his wife, Hilja Seltam, an Estonian migrant. They were married at the St Peter's Presbyterian Church, Cowra, on 25 August 1951. Here, he eventually acquired Australian naturalisation in 1951, which enabled him to gain employment with the NSW Department of Education. His first position was teaching physical education at Cowra High School, where he remained for ten years, and then as Special Master at Lithgow High School. Eventually he took the position of Special Master at Balgowlah Boys High School, which enabled him to move back to Sydney and settle in the Forest district of the North Shore. His last position as a teacher was his role as Deputy Principal of the NSW Correspondence School, retiring in August 1982. He strongly involved in his local community, joining the Apex club, Frenchs Forest Rotary and was a founding member of Belrose Rotary Club.

== Council ==
Couvret started his career in local government when the local 'B' riding councillor, Thomas Farrell retired, sparking a by-election for his seat on Warringah Shire Council. Couvret was subsequently elected as an Independent on 24 February 1973. For the 1977 elections, C Riding was split into two and Couvret's B riding was renamed D riding. Couvret eventually rose to be Deputy Shire President in 1978 and then Shire President in September 1979, where he presided over long-term planning for the Warringah area and various projects, including the Glen Street Theatre and the Oxford Falls Peace Park. He served as president until 1983.

Couvret remained as a councillor until the council was dismissed in December 1985 by the Wran Government following supposed discrepancies in council planning decisions. However, following a successful legal challenge against the government by the NSW Fraud Ombudsman, it was subsequently found that there was no evidence of corruption to support the dismissal, and that "the elected councillors were denied natural justice and were both unfairly and unlawfully dismissed". When the council was returned on 14 March 1987 after the local elections, Couvret was returned as a councillor. In 1993 Couvret returned to Nagasaki to attend a conference of Mayors for Peace. He met a Japanese woman who as a child had been forced to work in the same shipyard.

Remaining on Council, following the proclamation of former A Riding as Pittwater Council, his D Riding was renamed 'C Ward', and served until his retirement in 1995 (following the passing of the Local Government Act 1993, Warringah Council dropped 'Shire' and Shire Presidents became Mayors). In addition, Couvret served on the executive of the Local Government Association of NSW for eight years.

== Later life ==
In 1998, he was awarded a Medal of the Order of Australia (OAM) "for service to local government through the Warringah Shire Council, to veterans, and to the community" and is also on the Order of Australia Medal Committee. Couvret also received the Centenary Medal in 2001. He was also the President of the Dutch Australia Association and the Netherlands Ex-Servicemen & Women's Association and the President of Wakehurst Public School and Davidson High School parents and citizens associations. On 25 February 2011, he was appointed by Queen Beatrix as a Knight of the Order of Orange-Nassau and invested at a ceremony commemorating the Battle of the Java Sea by the Dutch Consul-General in Sydney, Jaap Fredericks. Couvret died aged 91 on 5 July 2013. In June 2014, Warringah Council voted to commemorate Couvret's service by installing a plaque in his honour, to be placed at the Oxford Falls Peace Park, of which Couvret had been a driving force in its establishment and conservation of the historic one-room school. The plaque was unveiled on ANZAC Day 2015. In August 2014, the Dutch Ambassador to Australia, Annemieke Ruigrok, launched the publication of Couvret's memoirs: "Memoirs of Paul Couvret: A story of colonialism and war, peace and reconciliation in the Pacific", compiled by historian Edith van Loo.

Civic offices
Preceded by Gavin Anderson	Deputy Shire President of Warringah; 1978 – 1979	Succeeded by Richard Legg
Preceded by Gavin Anderson	Shire President of Warringah; 1979 – 1983	Succeeded by Darren Jones
