= Julie Sutton (mayor) =

Australian politician (born 1937)

Julie Sutton OAM JP

38th Mayor of Warringah
- In office 19 September 1995 – 24 September 1996
- Deputy: Sam Danieli
- Preceded by: Brian Green
- Succeeded by: Sam Danieli
- In office 26 September 2002 – 23 July 2003
- Deputy: David Stephens
- Preceded by: Darren Jones
- Succeeded by: Dick Persson (Administrator)

Councillor of Warringah Council
- In office 20 September 1980 – 4 December 1985
- Constituency: D Riding
- In office 14 March 1987 – 23 July 2003
- Constituency: D Riding/C Ward
- In office 13 September 2008 – 8 September 2012
- Succeeded by: Jose Menano-Pires
- Constituency: C Ward

Personal details
- Born: 1937 (age 88–89) Newcastle, New South Wales, Australia
- Party: Labor (1969–1985); Independent (1985–2012)
- Education: Newcastle University; University of New England; Macquarie University
- Occupation: Teacher and Marriage Celebrant

Julie Sutton (née Goffet; born. 1937) is an Australian former politician, teacher and Marriage Celebrant, elected as a Councillor of Warringah Council and was previously Mayor of Warringah from 1995 to 1996 and 2002 to 2003.

== Early life ==
Sutton was born in Australia in 1937, growing up in Newcastle on the New South Wales Central Coast. The daughter of schoolteacher Charles Goffet (1909–1991), who taught French at Newcastle Boys High School from 1942 to 1978, her sister is former NSW Federal Labor politician and Minister, Jeannette McHugh. Sutton was educated at Newcastle Girls' High School, where she was School Captain and took equal first place for French in her Leaving Certificate in 1953. Although gaining a matriculation scholarship in French to study at the University of Sydney, Sutton later discontinued her Bachelor of Arts at the university and later studied at the Universities of Newcastle (Newcastle Teachers College), New England and Macquarie completing a Master of Arts with Honours (MA Hons.) and a Diploma of Education (DipEd), becoming a teacher. She taught French, German and English at Raymond Terrace High School and Newcastle Girls'. Moving to Sydney in 1965, Sutton became a Teacher of English and Modern Languages at The Forest High School, Davidson High School and Killarney Heights High School from 1965 to 1986. She married Robert Sutton in Newcastle in 1959, which was later dissolved, and had three sons.

== Local Government career ==
In 1980, Sutton stood for election as a Labor Party candidate in D Riding of Warringah Shire Council and on 20 September 1980 became only the fourth female councillor elected to Warringah. She served on the council until it was dismissed in December 1985 by the Wran Government following supposed discrepancies in council planning decisions. However, following a successful legal challenge against the government by the NSW Fraud Ombudsman, it was subsequently found that there was no evidence of corruption to support the dismissal, and that "the elected councillors were denied natural justice and were both unfairly and unlawfully dismissed". Sutton was one of the few councillors that supported the dismissal however, but nevertheless noted in her first council meeting back after the dismissal: "Even though I went against you in the election, I will certainly support you. [Joking] There is certainly a balance of brains and talent with one woman and 11 men ... In this case the men won - not the better men, but the men". When the council was returned on 14 March 1987 after the local elections, Sutton remained as a councillor but in September 1987 was elected as Deputy Shire President alongside Shire President Ted Jackson. As Deputy Shire President, Sutton unveiled the central fountain sculpture in Westfield Warringah Mall, entitled "Pacific Family" by Victor Cusack, on 23 November 1988 to commemorate the Australian Bicentenary.

In 1981 Sutton was appointed by the Minister for Education, Paul Landa, to serve a four-year term on the Council of the Kuring-gal College of Advanced Education. Serving until 1985, Sutton was briefly re-appointed by Minister Terry Metherell to serve on the final Council from 1 August to 31 December 1989, prior to the college's transformation into UTS Ku-ring-gai Campus from 1 January 1990. She became involved in Council Committees, supporting the Forest Community Association, whose work resulted in the establishment in 1985 of the Forest Community Centre/Glen Street Theatre, now one of Sydney's leading artistic venues, and the creation of Garigal National Park, the result of very long negotiations with Dainford Ltd, the then State Government and Warringah Council and Narrabeen Lagoon Committee. Dainford agreed to transfer 800 hectares of privately owned land into public ownership in exchange for approval to build the Austlink Corporate Park thus creating Garigal National Park in 1991. Sutton was elected as Deputy Shire President for a further three terms: 1989–1990, 1991–1992 and 1992–1993.

She could not, however, match this success at the state level and failed to gain election as the ALP candidate to the New South Wales Legislative Assembly seat of Davidson against Terry Metherell in 1981, and 1984. In 1985 Sutton was expelled from the ALP for voting for a Labor colleague, Brian Green, to be Shire President against instructions from Labor caucus. She stood again as an Independent against Metherell in Davidson at the 1988 election but was again unsuccessful. Although she did not stand as a candidate in 1991 state election, Sutton stood again as an independent at the 1992 by-election, taking place during the midst of a public scandal over the manner of Metherell's departure, with the government's tenuous position in the hands of the voters at the by-election. Premier Nick Greiner himself, who later resigned over the 'Metherell Affair', attempted to label Sutton a "Labor stooge" and a "Terry Metherell in skirts", in reference to her former membership of the ALP. Sutton nevertheless stood against fellow councillor and Liberal candidate Andrew Humpherson, taking second place and forcing Humpherson to rely on preferences to be elected in a traditionally very safe seat, with Sutton gaining 29.5 percent of the primary vote and 40.3 percent of the two party preferred vote.

Remaining on Council, following the proclamation of former A Riding as Pittwater Council, her D Riding was renamed 'C Ward', and she was elected as deputy mayor from 1994 to 1995 (following the passing of the Local Government Act 1993, Warringah Council dropped 'Shire' and shire presidents became mayors). From 19 September 1995 Sutton was elected as "Her Worship the Mayor of Warringah Council", becoming the second mayor of Warringah and the first female leader of the council. As mayor she assisted in the establishment of the Austlink Business Park between Forest Way and Mona Vale Road in Belrose, providing hundreds of jobs in Warringah. She remained as mayor until 24 September 1996. Sutton was again elected deputy mayor alongside Darren Jones from 2001 to 2002 before returning as mayor from 26 September 2002 until the council's dismissal on 23 July 2003.

== Later career ==
Sutton continued serving the community for the next five years without a council under the administration of Dick Persson. This lasted until the local government elections of 23 September 2008, which saw her elected for another four-year term in C Ward, making Sutton the longest-serving member of the council. On 30 September 2011, Sutton was elected by the council as deputy mayor. On her election, the mayor, Michael Regan, congratulated Sutton "who has served the community of Warringah with loyalty and passion for more than 30 years". On her election Sutton also made clear that her current term would be her last, announcing her intention not to stand for re-election at the 2012 NSW Local Government Elections.

On 29 May 2012, Sutton was tributed in the NSW Parliament by the Member for Davidson, Jonathan O'Dea and the Member for Wakehurst, Brad Hazzard, who nominated her for the Woman of the Year award. On 24 August 2012, at the final council meeting before the elections, Sutton was awarded the title of emeritus Mayor by the Local Government Associations of NSW in recognition of her service to Warringah Council. Mayor Regan noted her final meeting as a Councillor by saying: "Councillor Sutton has only ever missed one council meeting since she joined Council in 1980 – this is quite a remarkable testament to her work ethic and commitment to her role as a Councillor. Councillor Sutton will of course be fondly remembered for her epic contribution to this community by our local MPs, former Councillors, staff and the residents – she has worked incredibly hard and achieved a great many things. Councillor Sutton has had an impact on us all. She has entertained us with her wit and reminded us of what really matters within this community. I know that while she will no longer be sitting here at this table, she will continue to work tirelessly as she always has to help so many and the community she loves."

Sutton was recognised with the Medal of the Order of Australia (OAM) in the 2022 Australia Day Honours for services to the community of the Northern Beaches.

Civic offices
| Preceded by Mark Hummerston | Deputy Shire President of Warringah; 1987 – 1988 | Succeeded by Brian Green |
| Preceded by Brian Green | Deputy Shire President of Warringah; 1989 – 1990 | Succeeded by Frank Beckman |
| Preceded by Andrew Humpherson | Deputy Shire President of Warringah; 1992 – 1993 | Succeeded by Sam Danieli as Deputy Mayor |
| Preceded by Sam Danieli | Deputy Mayor of Warringah; 1994 – 1995 | Succeeded by Sam Danieli |
| Preceded by Brian Green | Mayor of Warringah; 1995 – 1996 | Succeeded by Sam Danieli |
| Preceded by Darren Jones | Deputy Mayor of Warringah; 2001 – 2002 | Succeeded by David Stephens |
| Preceded by Darren Jones | Mayor of Warringah; 2002 – 2003 | Succeeded by Dick Persson as Administrator |
| Preceded by Michelle Ray | Deputy Mayor of Warringah; 2011 – 2012 | Succeeded by Bob Giltinan |
