= Electoral district of Warringah =

Former state electoral district of New South Wales, Australia

Warringah was an electoral district of the Legislative Assembly in the Australian state of New South Wales and named after and including the Warringah region of the northeastern suburbs of Sydney. It was created in 1894, when multi-member districts were abolished, and the three member district of St Leonards was divided between Warringah, St Leonards and Willoughby. It was abolished in 1904 as a result of the 1903 New South Wales referendum, which required the number of members of the Legislative Assembly to be reduced from 125 to 90, and was partly replaced by Middle Harbour.

== Members for Warringah ==
Member	Party	Period
Dugald Thomson	Free Trade	1894–1898
Dugald Thomson	National Federal	1898–1901
Ellison Quirk	Independent	1901–1904

== Election results ==
1901 New South Wales state election: Warringah
Party	Candidate	Votes	%	±%
Independent	Ellison Quirk	739	34.7	
Independent Liberal	James Alderson	604	28.4	
Liberal Reform	James Conroy	490	23.0	−22.0
Independent Liberal	Thomas Loxton	296	13.9	
Total formal votes		2,129	100.0	+0.5
Informal votes		0	0.0	−0.5
Turnout		2,129	62.6	−3.3
Independent gain from Progressive				

The sitting member was Dugald Thomson (Progressive), (Note: Dugald Thomson had been elected as member of the Progressive party in 1898, then known as the National Federal party, described as a free trade federationist.) who did not contest the election as he had been elected in March 1901 as a Free Trade member for the federal seat of North Sydney.
