= Dugald Thomson =

Australian politician (1849–1922)

The Honourable Dugald Thomson
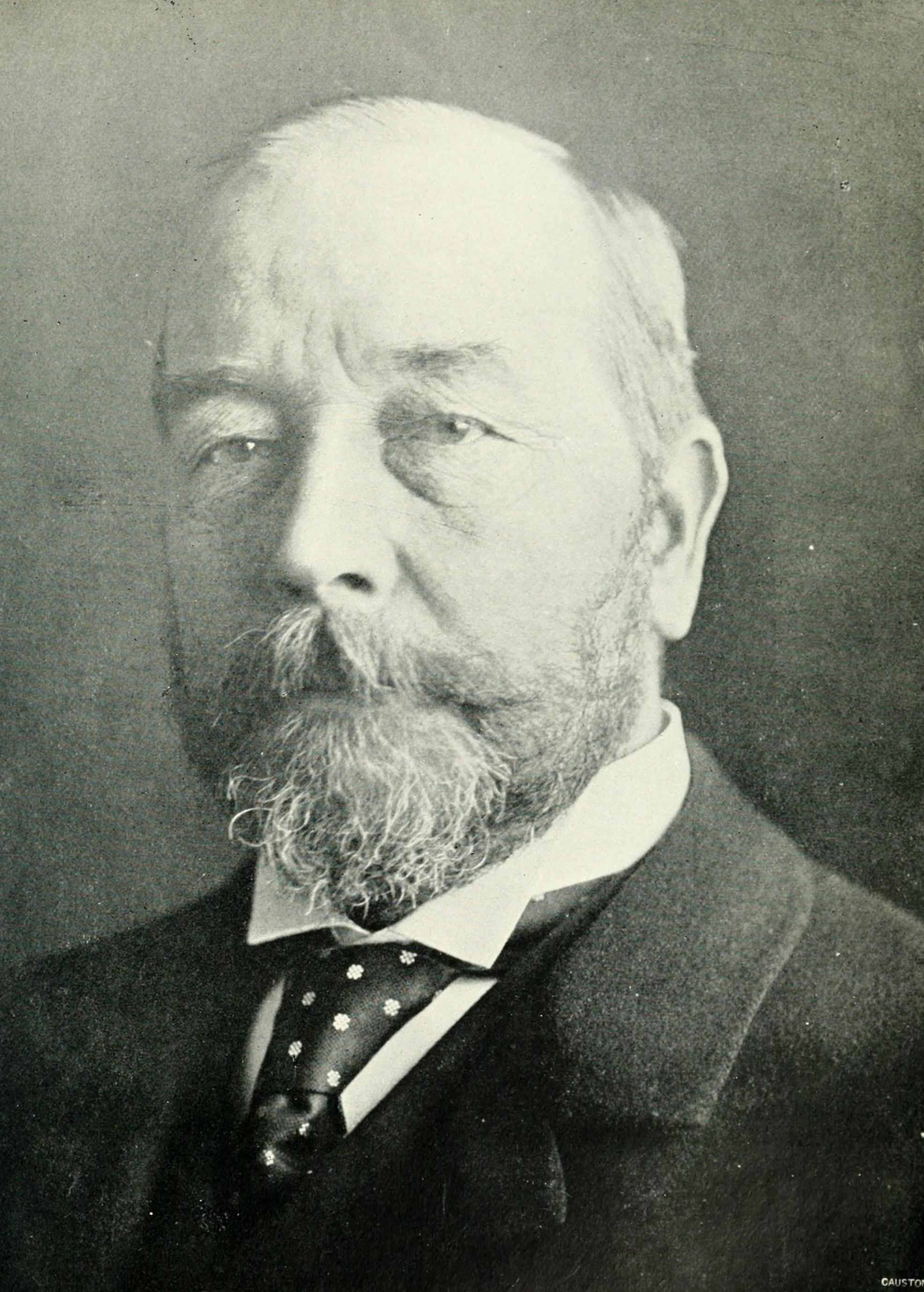

Minister for Home Affairs
- In office 17 August 1904 – 5 July 1905
- Prime Minister: George Reid
- Preceded by: Lee Batchelor
- Succeeded by: Littleton Groom

Member of the Australian Parliament for North Sydney
- In office 29 March 1901 – 19 February 1910
- Preceded by: New seat
- Succeeded by: George Edwards

Personal details
- Born: 28 December 1849 Camberwell, London, England
- Died: 27 November 1922 (aged 72) Kirribilli, New South Wales, Australia
- Resting place: Gore Hill Cemetery
- Party: Free Trade (1901–06); Anti-Socialist (1906–09); Liberal (1909–10)
- Occupation: Businessman

Dugald Thomson (28 December 1849 – 27 November 1922) was an Australian politician and businessman. He campaigned for Federation as a member of the New South Wales Legislative Assembly (1894–1901), and was subsequently elected to the new federal House of Representatives (1901–1910). He served as Minister for Home Affairs in the Reid government from 1904 to 1905.

== Early life ==
Thomson was born on 28 December 1849 in Camberwell, London, England. He was the son of Scottish parents Jane (née Duncan) and John Thomson; his father was an insurance broker.

Thomson and his family immigrated to Australia in 1850, initially settling in South Australia and later moving to Victoria. He was sent to England to complete his education and trained with his uncle in Liverpool, later spending two years at sea. Thomson returned to Melbourne at the age of nineteen and joined Robert Harper & Co., a merchant firm. He established a Sydney branch of the company in 1877 and served as managing partner until 1892. He was also a business partner of James Garvan in the North Shore Steam Ferry Company.

Thomson played a key role in the creation of the Australasian New Hebrides Company (ANHC) in 1889, through his business connections in Sydney and ties with the Presbyterian Church which operated a mission in the New Hebrides. He was appointed as a director of the company and in 1891 was involved in a public spat with Presbyterian missionary John Gibson Paton over the company's operations. He remained as a director after his election to parliament and served until Burns, Philp & Co. took over the business in 1897.

== New South Wales politics ==
Thomson won the New South Wales Legislative Assembly seat of Warringah in 1894 and supported the Free Trade ministry of George Reid, although he opposed its legislation on workplace conditions, made necessary by its dependence on Labor Party support.

== Federal politics ==
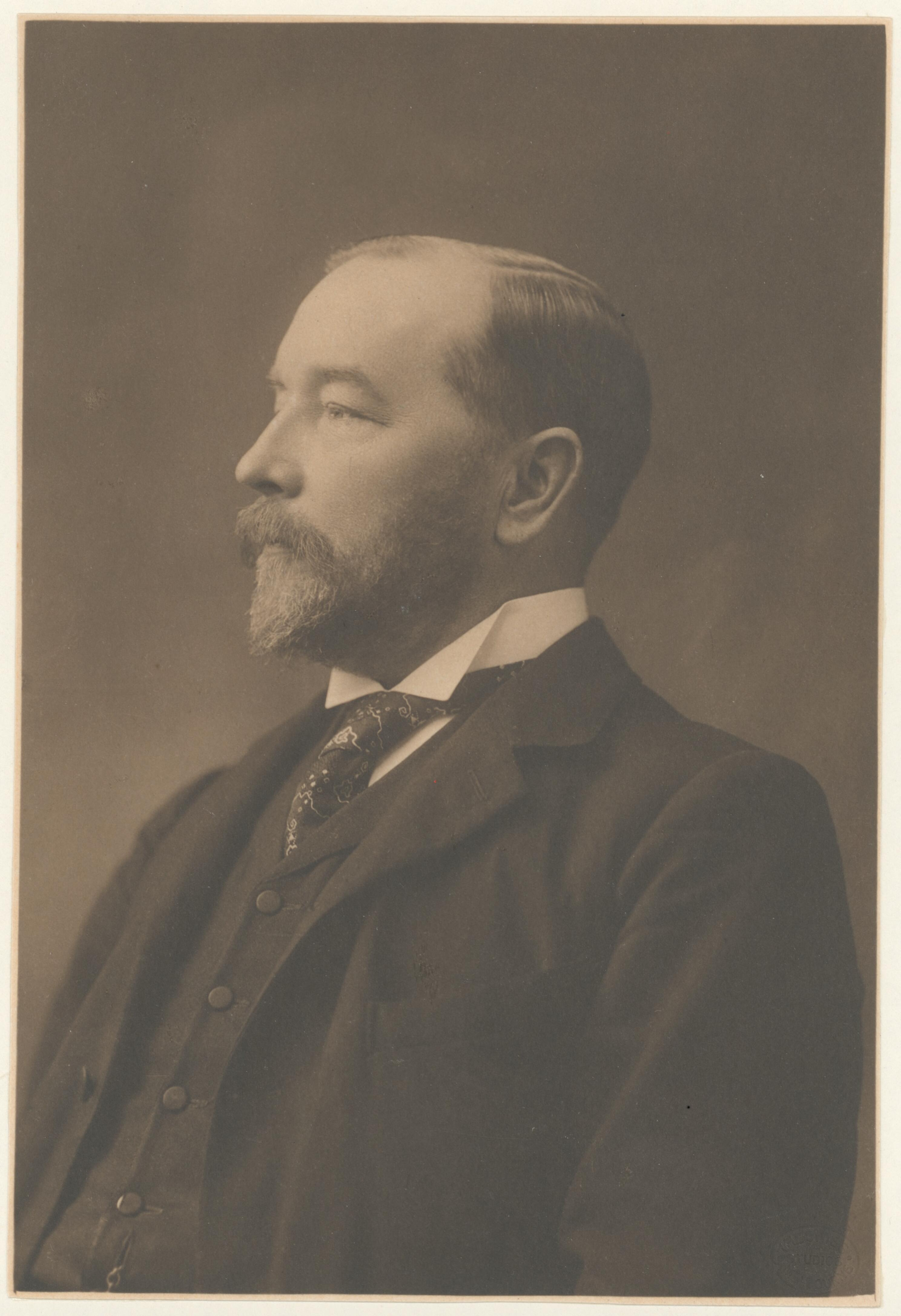
Thomson c. 1901

Thomson was a supporter of federation and won the House of Representatives seat of North Sydney at the 1901 election and held it to his retirement prior to the 1910 election. In early 1904, following the retirement of William McMillan, he was elected deputy leader of the Free Traders. He relinquished the position to Joseph Cook on 28 July 1905. During his period in parliament he spoke often on maritime matters, and served on two royal commissions.

Thomson was Minister for Home Affairs from 1904 to 1905 in the Reid Ministry. In that capacity he was responsible for progressing negotiations with the government of New South Wales on the Seat of Government Act 1904, which provided that the national capital should be located in the vicinity of Dalgety, New South Wales. The New South Wales premier Joseph Carruthers – although otherwise politically aligned with Thomson – opposed the selection of Dalgety and the pair "exchanged insults and accusations through official correspondence", with Thomson attempting to exert pressure on Carruthers via The Sydney Morning Herald.

In July 1909, Thomson was elected president of the newly formed New South Wales Federal Liberal League.

Thomson died in the Sydney suburb of Kirribilli at the age of 72, unmarried.

== Notes ==
New South Wales Legislative Assembly
New seat	Member for Warringah; 1894–1901	Succeeded by Ellison Quirk
Political offices
Preceded by John Forrest	Minister for Home Affairs; 1904–1905	Succeeded by Littleton Groom
Party political offices
Preceded by William McMillan	Deputy Leader of the Free Trade Party; 1904–1905	Succeeded by Joseph Cook
Parliament of Australia
New division	Member for North Sydney; 1901–1910	Succeeded by George Edwards
