= Mackellar County Council =

Former county council in NSW, Australia

- Company type: State–owned enterprise
- Industry: Public utility
- Founded: 11 August 1951
- Defunct: 1 January 1980
- Fate: Merged
- Successor: Sydney County Council
- Headquarters: 48-52 Sydney Road, Manly, New South Wales, Australia
- Area served: Municipality of Manly; Warringah Shire Council
- Services: Electricity retail and distribution Natural gas retail and distribution
- Owner: Government of New South Wales

The Mackellar County Council (MCC) was a county council and state–owned enterprise of the Government of New South Wales, Australia. Established in 1951, it was an electricity and gas supplier and retailer which primarily supplied the Northern Beaches area of Sydney, New South Wales, being jointly managed and operated by Manly Municipal Council and Warringah Shire Council.

== History ==
The Local Government Act 1919 (NSW) had provided for the establishment of County Districts and County Councils by whole, groups of, or parts of municipalities and shires to perform nominated functions delegated by the Councils concerned, although the majority of those councils dealt with infrastructure or utility planning. In the Northern Beaches area, the idea of a County Council, specifically dealing with the control and development of electric utilities in the area shared by Manly Municipality and Warringah Shire first occurred in 1938 and again in 1943 but was postponed for consideration because of the Second World War.

Manly and Warringah Councils considered the matter at a conference held on 17 March 1950, but Warringah Shire later withdrew its support for the proposal. However, later that same year, the Electricity Commission of New South Wales began investigations into the overall feasibility of the proposal. In its report of 14 March 1951 the Commission identified advantages of creating a county council comprising the two local government areas for the purpose of developing consistent electric utilities in the region. After further discussions in 1951, the councils of Manly and Warringah resolved to establish the Mackellar County Council consisting of three elected representatives from each Council to commence on 1 September 1951. The council adopted its name, following the 11 May 1949 proclamation of the local federal parliament Division of Mackellar, in honour of politician Sir Charles Mackellar and poet Dorothea Mackellar.

The resolutions of these meetings were forwarded to the Minister for Local Government, Joseph Cahill, who consented to the establishment and Constitution of the Mackellar County Council which were proclaimed on 4 July 1951 and published in the NSW Government Gazette of 13 July 1951. The first delegates to the Mackellar County Council were elected by the Warringah Shire Council on 16 July 1951 and by the Manly Municipality on 17 July 1951. The inaugural meeting was held at the Manly Municipal Council Chamber on 15 August and commenced operations on 1 September 1951. The Council eventually moved to more permanent headquarters, with the administrative headquarters positioned between Manly Local Court and Manly Town Hall on Belgrave Street in Manly and the technical headquarters situated in offices next to the Warringah Shire Hall on Pittwater Road, Brookvale. On 14 September 1962 the Minister for Local Government and Highways, Pat Hills, opened the new headquarters building of the County Council, located on 48-52 Sydney Road, Manly.

In May 1965, the employees of the County Council registered the "Mackeller County Council Employees Credit Union Limited". The Credit Union later operated as the Manly Warringah Credit Union. Then later became the Northern Beaches Credit Union and in 2016 merged with Community First Credit Union.

In 1968 the County Council was involved in litigation involving its responsibilities under the law over the liability of adjoining properties to its developments. The Supreme Court of New South Wales ruled that under the ordinances of the Local Government Act 1919, the council had liability over damage to adjoining properties to any of its developments. The case of Anderson v. Mackellar County Council is now an oft-cited case of precedent in construction law in Australia.

By the late 1970s, the NSW Government resolved to restructure of electricity distribution areas in New South Wales, which included the reduction of the number of electricity councils. This was implemented on 1 January 1980, with the Mackellar, St George, and Brisbane Water county councils being amalgamated with the Sydney County Council.

== Chairmen ==
Years	Name	Council
1951–1954	Aubrey Hanson Norman	Manly
1954–1955	James Anderson	Manly
1955–1957	Leonard McKay	Warringah
1957–1960	James Henry Brown	Manly
1960–1961	John Lawrence Fisher	Warringah
1961–1962	D. A. Button	Manly
1962–1963	Gordon Brown	Warringah
1963–1966	D. A. Button	Manly
1966–1967	E. R. Wilson	Warringah
1967–1969	W. R. Nicholas	Manly
1969–1970	David Hay	Manly
1970–1971	Winston Gray	Warringah
1971–1973	W. A. Manning	Manly
1973–1974	Kevin Begaud	Warringah
1974–1975	A. K. Walker	Manly
1975–1976	Colin Huntingdon	Warringah
1976–1977	W. R. Nicholas	Manly
1977	Colin Huntingdon	Warringah
1977–1978	W. A. Manning	Manly
1978–1980	Peter Dawson	Warringah

=== County Clerks ===
Years	Name
1951–1961	W. F. Horn
1961–1970	P. F. H. Cattley
1970–1980	E. F. G. Dibley

== Common Seal ==
Soon after the Council's establishment, the councillors resolved to commission a 'Common Seal' to be the primary visual identifier for the council. The Council asked the eminent local historian and President of the Manly and Warringah District Historical Society, Percy Walter Gledhill FRAHS to draw up a heraldic design that represented the area over which the council had responsibilities. Gledhill, who had noted to the Sydney Morning Herald that "They wanted something historic, something to represent light and something from the so-called arms of Manly and Warringah. Those arms aren't registered either, you know", made the following description of his design to the council:

"The scroll bears the name 'MACKELLAR COUNTY COUNCIL' and if desired the date of its institution could be added by placing beneath the scroll the date 1951.

The lower portion of the seal shows the landing of the first white man in Manly, viz., Governor Phillip, on 21st January 1788. The two aboriginals shown holding spears representing the original holders of the country. Phillip speaking of the Manly blacks said 'their confidence and manly behaviour induced me to give the name Manly Cove to this place'. The Barrenjoey lighthouse shown is erected at the extreme north of the area of the County Council and is emblematic of light, from the beacon lights of mediaeval times to the modern lights of today.

The flannel flowers remind us of what has been looked upon as the emblem of Warringah. This, together with the waratahs, are symbolic of the wild flowers of the district. The colours of the flowers, white and red, represent the English colours."
