= Dick Persson =

Australian public servant

Dick Persson AM

Administrator of Central Coast Council
- In office 30 October 2020 – 13 May 2021
- Nominated by: Shelley Hancock
- Appointed by: Margaret Beazley
- Preceded by: Lisa Matthews (Mayor)
- Succeeded by: Rik Hart

Administrator of Northern Beaches Council
- In office 12 May 2016 – 26 September 2017
- Nominated by: Paul Toole
- Appointed by: David Hurley
- Preceded by: New title
- Succeeded by: Michael Regan (Mayor)

Administrator of Port Macquarie-Hastings Council
- In office 27 February 2008 – 31 January 2009
- Nominated by: Paul Lynch
- Appointed by: Marie Bashir
- Preceded by: Rob Drew (Mayor)
- Succeeded by: Garry Payne

Administrator of Warringah Council
- In office 23 July 2003 – 13 September 2008
- Nominated by: Tony Kelly
- Appointed by: Marie Bashir
- Preceded by: Julie Sutton (Mayor)
- Succeeded by: Michael Regan (Mayor)

Personal details
- Born: 1950 (age 75–76)
- Spouse: Marie Persson
- Education: University of New South Wales
- Profession: Public servant

Richard Mark Persson AM (born 1950) is a former senior New South Wales and Queensland public servant and local government administrator. Persson currently serves as a member of the Central Sydney Planning Committee.

== Early career ==
Richard Mark Persson was originally from Randwick, New South Wales, where he graduated from the University of New South Wales with a Bachelor of Arts and began work for the Australian Labor Party (NSW Branch). In 1974, Persson was an electoral officer for NSW ALP Senator, Arthur Gietzelt, and was involved in organising an advertising campaign to promote the achievements of the Whitlam Labor Government at the time. In 1979 Persson was president of the ALP Wentworth Federal Electorate Council. Persson later worked as an assistant to the NSW Deputy Premier, Jack Ferguson, and then from 1983 worked for Housing Minister Frank Walker as a policy analyst for the Housing Commission of New South Wales and the succeeding Department of Housing from 1985 to 1988 (From 1987 as Deputy Director, policy and programs).

In March 1988, Persson resigned from the NSW Public Service in order to lead the federal housing policy review initiated by Minister for Housing and Aged Care, Peter Staples. However, his appointment came under criticism from the Federal Leader of the Opposition, Alexander Downer, who took issue with Persson's Labor background. Persson's review, which was completed by March 1989, rejected the idea raised by the Liberal opposition of an allocated housing allowance instead of specific public housing, and identified four major problems in the housing market: lack of appropriately zoned and serviced land, high interest rates, the declining availability of low-cost rental housing, and inadequate links between housing and support services for special needs people.

In late 1989, when Frank Walker looked to transition to federal politics, Persson was recruited to work for Government of Queensland by Minister for Housing and Local Government Tom Burns as Director-General of the Department of Housing and Local Government, which had been created by the amalgamation of the Public Works Department and the Local Government Department. Persson was brought into the government to push through the Goss Government's plans to initiate significant cultural change in the Queensland Public Service following the Bjelke-Petersen era and for the first time his department took on planning responsibilities (becoming the Department of Housing, Local Government and Planning). Persson continued serving in this position for the government of Wayne Goss under Minister Terry Mackenroth from 1992.

In early 1994 the Director-General of Queensland Health Department, Dr Peter Stanley, resigned suddenly leaving the job vacant and Persson was quickly moved into the position by mid-1994, even though he did not apply for the position, reporting to Minister for Health, Ken Hayward. His appointment, given his lack of medical policy expertise, was controversial, with the Queensland Branch of the Australian Medical Association taking particular issue. But Hayward defended him, noting "this whole exercise shows yet again the AMA's single purpose is to oppose the Government at every opportunity". He served until early 1995 when Persson took up a new position for the New South Wales Government of Bob Carr as Director-General of the new Department of Public Works and Services, replacing Ron Christie and reporting to Ministers Michael Knight, Carl Scully, Ron Dyer and Morris Iemma. In 1997 the Commonwealth Government of John Howard brought Persson in to serve as Director of the 1997–98 National Housing Policy Review. In 2001 Persson was elected to serve of the Council of The Women's College, University of Sydney, and he served until 2014.

Persson served as Director-General until the re-election of the Carr Government for a third term on 22 March 2003. This new government was marked by a significant reshuffle of ministerial portfolios and an extensive reorganisation of government departments. Persson's department was one of several that were abolished, with NSW Public Works moving into the new Department of Commerce on 2 April 2003 and Persson was placed on the unattached list. In 2003, Persson was appointed to the board of HealthQuest, a Statutory Health Corporation that reported to the NSW Minister for Health providing occupational health services to both government and private sector employees. Becoming Deputy Chairman in 2004, and assuming the role of Chairman in 2005, Persson served on the board until the abolition of HealthQuest on 1 July 2009.

== Local government career ==
=== Warringah Council ===
On 23 July 2003 the Minister for Local Government, Tony Kelly, following the release of the report of a public inquiry, headed by Emeritus Professor Maurice Daly, into the conduct and management of Warringah Council which revealed an extensive loss of trust between the council and its community, proclaimed that he had advised the Governor of NSW Marie Bashir to dismiss the council and appoint Persson as the Administrator of the council, with an initial term due to expire on 1 August 2005.

Coming in to administer one of the most complained-about councils in the state, Persson took on the role of transforming the administration of council through implementing good practice and the removal of conflicts of interests in council operations. This included in the matter of planning decisions and conflicts of interests of the former councillors, the extent of which Persson found particularly surprising: "When I arrived here I was given a security card like most of us have nowadays. I thought "Oh, that's for security reasons". I later found out it was to keep councillors out of some parts of the council, because they were literally standing over the shoulder of people reviewing development applications, asking them questions and putting pressure on them, possibly indirectly, certainly clearly." To combat the primary problem of a public lack of trust in the council, in 2003 Persson also appointed Dr John Warburton as the first Internal Ombudsman of the council.

In September 2004, Persson requested that his term as Administrator be extended beyond his initial term, which was scheduled to expire on 1 August 2005, citing a number of important projects yet to be completed and the continuing work establishing a change in culture amongst staff at the council. An extension was approved by the Governor until the Local Government Elections in September 2008, at which point a new council was elected with a new directly-elected mayor, Michael Regan, whose party ticket ran on a platform of council to be 'run as a board of directors'. Immediately before the elections, Persson made the unprecedented step of commenting on political affairs, expressing a desire for individuals involved with the former dismissed council not to stand for election and noted in particular one candidate as having been prominent in the disruptive nature of the previous council and was "the only candidate in Warringah whom I sincerely hope does not get elected."

In the 2006 Australia Day Honours Persson was appointed a Member of the Order of Australia (AM) for "service to the community, particularly through the development and implementation of new public policy initiatives relating to health, electronic government-wide business and provision of public housing, and to planning and local government."

=== Port Macquarie-Hastings Council ===
On 27 February 2008, the Minister for Local Government, Paul Lynch, dismissed the Port Macquarie-Hastings Council and appointed Persson as the new administrator. The dismissal of Council was made after the mishandling of a project initiated in 2001 to build a cultural and entertainment centre, known to locals as the Glasshouse. The results of a public inquiry into the matter had reported back to the minister in February 2008 and had found that the Council had failed to provide appropriate financial and project management and had lost control of the costs, that the project costs had harmed the Council's ability to provide services and amenities to the community, and that the Council's "communications management strategies" had resulted in inadequate consultation with the public or appropriate regard to their concerns. Appointed for a four-year term, Minister Lynch noted that Persson had the task of "rebuilding the fundamentals of Council and to help re-unite the local community."

On 20 January 2009, administrator Dick Persson announced his decision to step down at the end of the month, citing the demands of being away from his Sydney home in Bronte for several days a week. He described the Glasshouse project as a "wrong decision" by the Council, attributing it to "woolly thinking with the best of intentions from people not experienced with planning and delivering major capital works." He was replaced in the role by Garry Payne, head of the Department of Local Government.

== Later life and career ==
In 2010–2011, Persson was appointed a Special Adviser on local government rate-setting functions for the NSW Independent Pricing and Regulatory Tribunal (IPART) and in 2009 was appointed a Director of the board of Bridge Housing Limited, a private-sector community housing provider in Sydney, which was renewed in 2011, 2014 and 2017. He retired from the Bridge Housing board in November 2020. On 29 August 2011, the Minister for Planning and Infrastructure, Brad Hazzard, appointed Persson to serve as the Chair of the Board of the Sydney Harbour Foreshore Authority and his term lasted until 21 August 2014. Persson is a Fellow of the Australian Institute of Management (FAIM) and a Fellow of the Australian Property Institute (FAPI).

=== Northern Beaches Council ===
In May 2016, with the release of the Local Government (Council Amalgamations) Proclamation 2016, Persson was announced as the Administrator of the new Northern Beaches Council, which comprises the former local government areas of Manly, Pittwater and Warringah. As administrator, Persson directed the implementation of functions of the combined councils into one and noted shortly before the September 2017 election that "I believe the integration of the three previous councils into one Northern Beaches Council is on track to become the benchmark in terms of performance. This is largely due to the skill and hard work of our Council staff and managers." Persson released a report to council in September 2017 entitled "Stronger Together: Administrator's Report to the Community", which detailed the achievements of the new council since the May 2016 proclamation. Persson remained as administrator until the election of the new mayor on 26 September 2017.

In 2019, Persson was appointed by the Minister for Planning, Rob Stokes, to be a member of the Central Sydney Planning Committee, which assesses all development over $50 million in the City of Sydney; the Committee comprises the Lord Mayor, two City of Sydney Councillors, and four people appointed by the Minister with expertise in relevant fields.

=== Central Coast Council ===
On 30 October 2020, the Minister for Local Government, Shelley Hancock announced Persson as the new interim Administrator of Central Coast Council for an initial period of three months after the council was suspended following the reveal of an $89 million debt in Council finances and an emergency $6.2 million loan provided by the NSW Government in order for Council to pay its own staff. Persson's appointment was announced with the task of ensuring "greater oversight and control over the council’s budget and expenditure to restore its financial sustainability and importantly reinstill the community’s trust in the effective functioning of their council." Persson was also appointed with Rik Hart on the administration operations team, with whom he had worked on the transformation at Warringah Council as administrator in 2007–2008, with Hart becoming Acting CEO on 3 November 2020.

On 2 December 2020, Persson delivered his first 30-day interim report which revealed "catastrophic budget mismanagement", including accumulated losses of $232 million since 2016, increased debt from $317 million (2016) to $565 million (2020), and an estimated operating loss of $115 million for 2020/2021 financial year, and that several actions were required to put the council in a stronger position, including asset sales of at least $40 million, an increase in rates and council charges, and a substantial reduction in Council staff to 2016 amalgamation levels including a significant reduction in upper and middle management positions. On 21 January 2021, the Minister for Local Government announced the extension of Persson's term for an additional three months to 29 April 2021, noting: "There is no doubt that [Persson] needs more time to develop and implement his recovery strategy to restore stability and address the significant reputational, financial and organisational issues. In particular, Mr Persson is focusing on recruiting a new general manager and putting a new budget in place for next financial year. Mr Persson and acting general manager Rik Hart have done an outstanding job to date and I thank them for their efforts in these very challenging circumstances."

On 15 April, Persson sent his final report to Minister Hancock expressing his view that "by far the greatest reason CCC became insolvent was due to mismanagement of their budget over the years following the merger and leading up to their suspension" and recommending that the Local Government Minister, "take whatever action necessary to prevent the return of the currently suspended councillors, and to delay the September 2021 election to allow a formal Inquiry to determine what is needed to achieve the successful merger of the two previous Councils." Persson's recommendations were subsequently supported by Shelley Hancock, who on 26 April 2021 announced the convening of a public inquiry and that, as a result, the Council would remain suspended, the elections scheduled for September 2021 would be postponed to September 2022, and Persson's term as administrator would be extended for a further two weeks to May 2021. Former acting CEO Rik Hart was also announced as the next administrator following Persson's decision to step down.

In January 2022, the former CEO of Central Coast Council, Gary Murphy, launched a civil case alleging defamation against Persson in the District Court of New South Wales. Murphy discontinued this case in March 2022.

Government offices
New title	Director-General of Queensland Housing, Local Government and Planning; 1989–1994	Succeeded by Ken Smith
Preceded by Dr Peter Stanley	Director-General of Queensland Health; 1994–1995	Succeeded by Jim Miller
Preceded by Ron Christie as Director-General of Public Works	Director-General of NSW Public Works and Services; 1995–2003	Succeeded by Kate McKenzie as Director-General of Commerce
Preceded by Mike Collins	Chairman of the Sydney Harbour Foreshore Authority; 2011–2014	Succeeded by Les Wielinga
Civic offices
Preceded by Julie Sutton as Mayor	Administrator of Warringah Council; 2003–2008	Succeeded by Michael Regan as Mayor
Preceded by Rob Drew as Mayor	Administrator of Port Macquarie-Hastings Council; 2008–2009	Succeeded by Garry Payne
New title	Administrator of Northern Beaches Council; 2016–2017	Succeeded by Michael Regan as Mayor
Preceded by Lisa Matthews as Mayor	Administrator of Central Coast Council; 2020–2021	Succeeded by Rik Hart
