= Ellison Quirk =

Australian politician (1866-1938)

14th Mayor of Manly
- In office 15 February 1901 – February 1907
- Preceded by: William Horner Fletcher
- Succeeded by: Alexander Learmonth
- Constituency: The Steyne Ward

3rd Shire President of Warringah
- In office 1 March 1910 – 1 March 1911
- Preceded by: Alexander Ralston
- Succeeded by: Alexander Ralston
- In office 1 March 1914 – 1 March 1915
- Preceded by: Alexander Ralston
- Succeeded by: John Duffy
- In office 1 March 1918 – 1 March 1919
- Preceded by: John Duffy
- Succeeded by: Henry Lodge
- Constituency: A Riding

Personal details
- Born: 8 July 1866 Lucknow, Colony of New South Wales
- Died: 16 November 1938 (aged 72) Manly, New South Wales, Australia

Ellison Wentworth Quirk (8 July 1866 – 16 November 1938) was an Australian politician. He was an Alderman and member of the New South Wales Legislative Assembly, representing the electorate of Warringah from 1901 to 1904.

== Early life ==
Quirk was born in 1866 in the town of Lucknow, near Orange, New South Wales on the Wentworth goldfields, the son of Robert Quirk. Quirk grew up in the nearby town of Forbes until the age of 15, when his family settled in Manly in 1881. He eventually established himself within the Manly community as a Storekeeper and Land Agent. He married Margaret Ann Mills on 19 November 1896 and they had two daughters and two sons. Quirk involved himself in local politics at the time and identified himself with the Free Trade Party, not uncommon for members of the Sydney business community at the time. When Henry Parkes won the NSW Legislative Assembly seat of St Leonards in 1885, Quirk worked in his office.

== Political career ==
Holding prominent positions as secretary of the Manly Fire Brigade and president of Manly District Ambulance Brigade, Quirk eventually stood for office as became an Alderman on Manly Municipal Council in 1896 and rose to become Mayor from 1901 to 1906. He would remain a Manly Alderman until his retirement in 1928. Quirk then stood for state office in 1901 when the local member for Warringah, Dugald Thomson, resigned so that he could stand for the seat of North Sydney in the new Federal Parliament. Elected as an independent, Quirk was aligned with the government of the day led by Sir John See and Thomas Waddell. He served on a parliamentary committee that resulted in an act that allowed the extension of a railway to the Portland Cement Works.

He held his seat in parliament until it was abolished as a part of the reduction in size of the Legislative Assembly following federation, and contested the new seat of Middle Harbour (which absorbed the majority of Warringah) at the 1904 election. Quirk stood as an Independent Progressive but nevertheless lost the election to Dr. Richard Arthur 58-40%. Quirk then stood for election to the first council of the newly proclaimed Warringah Shire Council on 3 December 1906. Subsequently elected as an Alderman, he rose to be Shire President on three consecutive occasions in 1910, 1913–1914 and 1918–1919. He served on the council until 1922.

Joining the Labor Party, Quirk attempted to re-enter state politics as the ALP candidate for Middle Harbour in the 1913 state election, but was again unsuccessful against Dr Arthur. The Sydney Morning Herald in particular noted with interest his change of party allegiance since leaving parliament: "Mr. Quirk's debut as a pledged [Labor] caucus candidate is, of course, something new for the electors to meditate upon. Whilst he was always considered a supporter of the Labour party, this is the first occasion on which he has accepted the conditions attached to the signing of the Labour caucus pledge."

In 1918, Quirk was one of seven Manly aldermen who were charged and found guilty for accepting free ferry passes from the Port Jackson and Manly Steamship Company. The magistrate convicted the seven aldermen of contravening the Local Government Act and disqualified them to act as aldermen. As the council only had a total of nine aldermen, there was a period when the council did not have quorum and therefore did not function. These convictions were overturned on appeal.

Eventually retiring from public life in 1928, Quirk died in November 1938 and was buried in Manly cemetery. Quirk Road in Manly Vale in the former Manly Council area and Quirk Street in Dee Why in the former Warringah Council area are named after him.

== Notes ==
New South Wales Legislative Assembly
Preceded by Dugald Thomson	Member for Warringah; 1901 – 1904	District abolished
Civic offices
Preceded by William Horner Fletcher	Mayor of Manly; 1901 – 1906	Succeeded by Alexander Learmonth
Preceded by Alexander Ralston	Shire President of Warringah; 1910 – 1911	Succeeded by Alexander Ralston
Preceded by William Hews	Shire President of Warringah; 1914 – 1915	Succeeded by John Duffy
Preceded by John Duffy	Shire President of Warringah; 1918 – 1919	Succeeded by Henry Lodge
