= Warringah Civic Centre =

Coordinates: 33.7513°S 151.2870°E

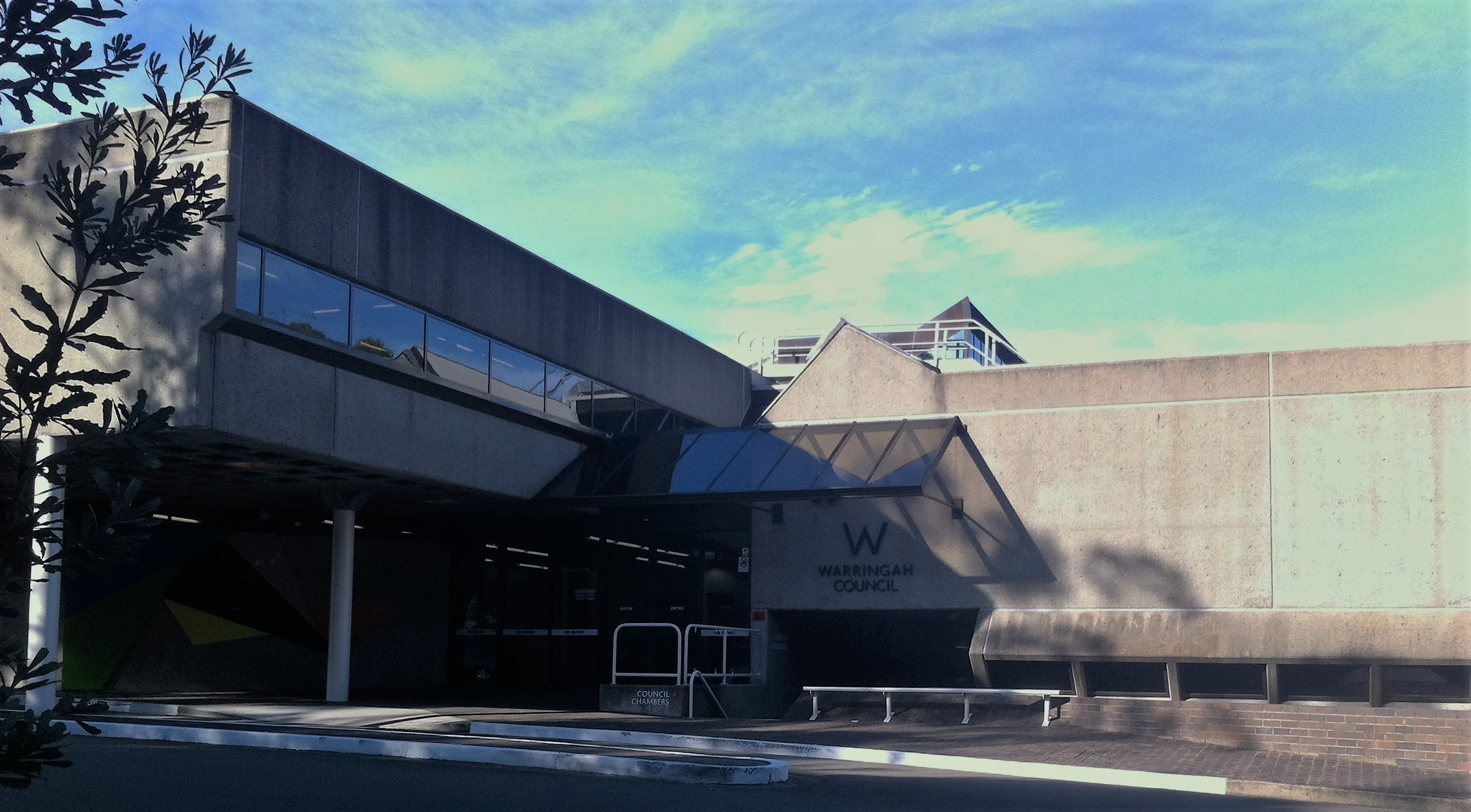
- Front facade and entrance
- Former names: Warringah Shire Civic Centre
- Alternative names: Dee Why Civic Centre, Northern Beaches Civic Centre

General information
- Type: Government town hall
- Architectural style: Brutalist style
- Location: Pittwater Road, Dee Why, New South Wales, Australia
- Construction started: 1971
- Completed: 1 September 1973
- Client: Warringah Shire Council
- Owner: Northern Beaches Council (current)

Design and construction
- Architects: Christopher Kringas; Colin Madigan; Bruce Mackenzie (landscape)
- Architecture firm: Edwards, Madigan, Torzillo and Briggs
- Main contractor: Dowsett Engineering (Aust) Pty. Ltd.

The Warringah Civic Centre is a landmark civic building in Dee Why, a suburb of Sydney. It stands in the centre of Dee Why, along Pittwater Road. Designed in the Brutalist style by Christopher Kringas and Colin Madigan, it replaced the Warringah Shire Hall, a 1923 building also on Pittwater Road but in Brookvale opposite Brookvale Oval. The Civic Centre was the seat of Warringah Council from its opening on 1 September 1973 to 12 May 2016, when it became a seat (primary from September 2017) of the new Northern Beaches Council.

== History ==
=== Early history and development ===
By the late 1960s, Warringah Shire Council had recognised the inefficiencies of their headquarters in the Shire Hall at Brookvale, and that it was far too small for the needs of the growing council. In December 1968, the Shire President Colin Huntingdon noted that "A new Shire Hall is so overdue it isn't funny. The staff are working in rabbit warrens which doesn't help efficiency."

Brookvale remained the administrative centre for Warringah until 1971 when the council resolved to commence the construction of a new Civic Centre in Dee Why. When the council eventually moved to the new Civic Centre in 1973, the Warringah Shire Hall in Brookvale was threatened with demolition in the mid-1970s. Despite some calls for the historic hall to be saved and be used as a community centre, their efforts were to no avail and the hall was demolished in late 1978.

=== Planning and completion ===
In the early 1960s, the Council initiated planning for a new 'Civic Centre' located in Dee Why to serve as a new home for the council. After commissioning architects Edwards Madigan Torzillo & Briggs, Kringas and Madigan came up with designs for a 'new acropolis' on a three-acre site along Pittwater Road that rises steeply from a flat coastal plain. In the early, ambitious stages of the masterplan design, Kringas and Madigan drew up a 100-year plan for the site, which included a civic centre, library, gymnasium, art gallery, public plaza and war memorial and a music auditorium. However, the vision proved too ambitious and council commissioned an initial project of the Dee Why Library. The library, completed in 1966, was praised for its innovative modernist design and was awarded the 1966 Sir John Sulman Medal from the NSW Chapter of the Royal Australian Institute of Architects.

Kringas and Madigan were commissioned for the Civic Centre in 1970, which, although designed in a starker Brutalist style to the library, was created to complement the library and, like the library, to sit within the natural bushland setting of the site. The sympathetic landscape setting of native bushland was overseen by landscape architect Bruce Mackenzie. Work began on the Civic Centre in 1971. It was designed in conjunction with the development of the National Gallery and was completed in 1973. The centre adjoins Madigan and Kringas's earlier library. Together they form the first two elements of a proposed cultural and administrative complex. The Civic Centre has been described as a 'testing ground' for the National Gallery (1982) and High Court (1980).

The Civic Centre was officially opened on 1 September 1973 by the Shire President, Councillor Dick Legg, and has been the seat of the council since then. After completing the design of the High Court of Australia, Kringas died of bowel cancer in 1975, aged 38. Madigan was awarded the Gold Medal by the Royal Australian Institute of Architects for lifetime efforts in the field of architecture in 1981. In 2008 the Civic Centre precinct, including the library and surrounding bushland, was nominated for State Heritage listing. This was deferred, but has again been nominated in 2017, with the centre precinct being noted as "significant examples of the Brutalist Style demonstrating the move away from the constraints of the modular structural systems to a more flexible form of architecture" and as "of state heritage significance for its aesthetic significance and landmark qualities derived largely from the integration of the sculptural man-made elements with natural landscape elements." The Civic Centre precinct has been listed on the NSW Chapter of the Australian Institute of Architects' register of Nationally Significant 20th-Century Architecture.

== Gallery ==
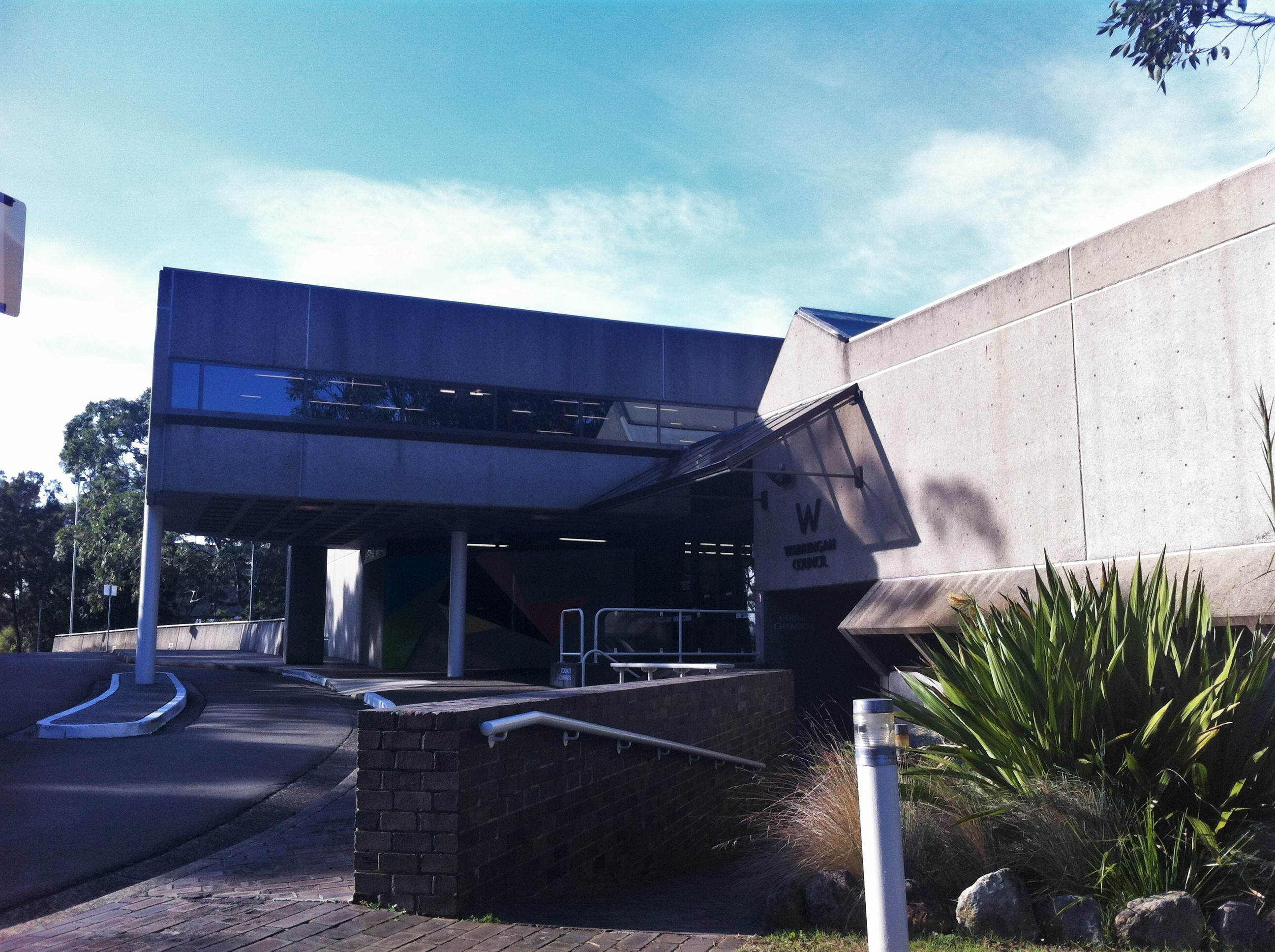
Civic Centre front facade with Council Chamber entrance, May 2016

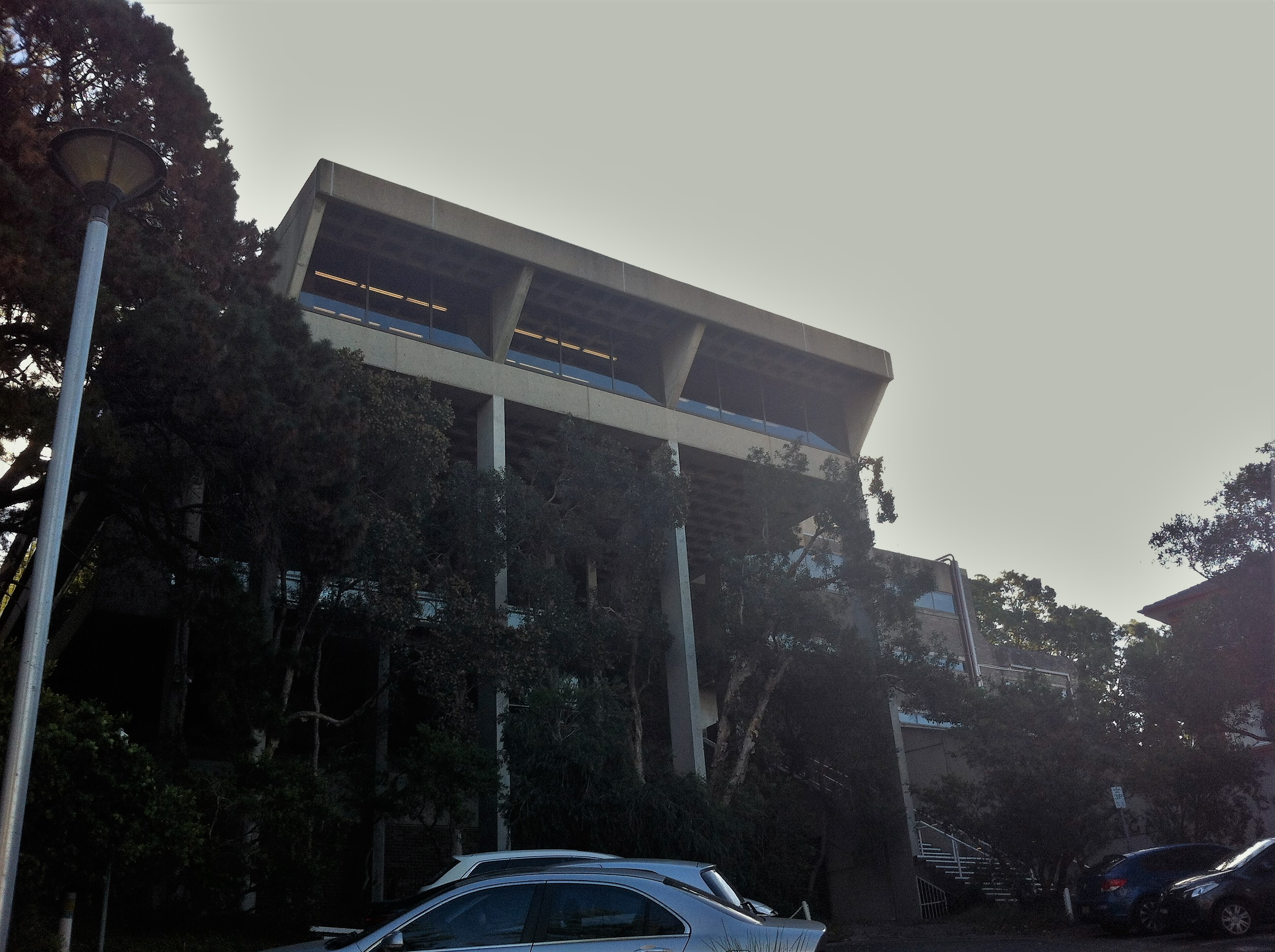
Civic Centre rear view along Pittwater Road, May 2016

== See also ==
- List of town halls in Sydney
- List of city and town halls
- Architecture of Sydney
