= Warringah Shire Hall =

- Warringah Shire Council 'Sanivans' outside the Shire Hall, 1954. Note the Mackellar County Council offices to the left.

General information
- Type: Government town hall
- Architectural style: Inter-war Stripped Classical
- Location: 734 Pittwater Road, Brookvale, New South Wales, Australia
- Completed: 1923
- Client: Warringah Shire Council

Design and construction
- Architects: Frederick Trenchard Smith; Samuel Maisey
- Architecture firm: Trenchard Smith & Maisey (1923–1928)
- Main contractor: H. E. Jackson (1923)

The Warringah Shire Hall was an Australian municipal town hall located on Pittwater Road opposite Robert Street in Brookvale, a suburb of the Northern Beaches of Sydney, New South Wales. Initially built in 1910 as a Federation bungalow, the complex was expanded with the addition of "Shire Hall" in 1912, the final form was completed in 1923 with the addition of a second floor to a design by Trenchard Smith and Maisey. The Shire Hall was the seat of Warringah Council from 1910 to 1973, when the council moved to a new purpose-built Civic Centre on further down Pittwater Road in Dee Why. The Shire Hall survived amid uncertainty over its future but was eventually sold and demolished in 1978.

== History ==
The original council chambers and Shire Clerk's residence on Pittwater Rd, c. 1911

=== Council Chambers, 1910–1923 ===
When Warringah Shire Council was formed in 1906, the Council first met in the Narrabeen Progress Hall on 14 June 1906, before moving to Brookvale. From March 1907 the Council leased "Smith's Hall" (later to be known as "Empire Hall") in West Street, Brookvale from Mr W. Smith to act as their council chambers. On 26 February 1910, a more permanent chambers was built on Pittwater Road, facing the land that would soon become Brookvale Oval. The opening was conducted by Shire President Alexander Ralston and was attended by Dr. Richard Arthur, Member for Middle Harbour. This first Council Chambers was a small Federation Bungalow style building which served both as council offices and the Shire Clerk's residence.

=== First Shire Hall, 1912–1923 ===
The second Shire Hall on its completion, c. 1912.

People welcoming Soldiers home from the First World War outside the second Shire Hall, 1918

In July 1912 the council commissioned architect James Campbell to design and build a larger Shire Hall, also in the Federation style, next to the council chambers building for the sum of £945. On 16 November 1912 the Shire Hall was officially opened by Shire President William Hews, with speeches on the occasion from Sir Granville Ryrie (Federal Member for Warringah), Dr. Richard Arthur MLA and Alderman Ellison Quirk.

=== Second Shire Hall, 1923–1978 ===
In 1923, the council commissioned the construction of a new Shire Hall to remodel the previous hall in a more modern style. The new Shire Hall was designed by Manly architects Frederick Trenchard Smith and Samuel Maisey (of the firm Trenchard Smith & Maisey) in an Inter-war Stripped Classical style with a much more imposing two-storey facade along Pittwater Road. Local builder H. E. Jackson was contracted for the construction of the new Shire Hall. One notable feature of the new Shire Hall facade was the inclusion of two concrete Doric-style fluted columns. The alterations, which were completed in 1926, were also notable in that it was one of the last construction projects in the greater Sydney area to use shell lime mortar.

The revival design was very similar to Trenchard Smith & Maisey's later work in designing the new Manly Town Hall (1937). In 1928 Trenchard Smith & Maisey were again contracted to design and build various extensions and additions to the existing Shire Hall, including the council public office next door. On 1 September 1951, the Mackellar County Council was established, consisting of three representatives from Warringah Shire and three from Manly Municipality, and its technical offices were located in this new extension on Pittwater road.

=== Later history ===
By the late 1960s, council had recognised the inefficiencies of the Shire Hall and that it was far too small for the needs of the growing council and debate continued on the initiation of a new civic centre for the council. In December 1968, the Shire President Colin Huntingdon noted that "A new Shire Hall is so overdue it isn't funny. The staff are working in rabbit warrens which doesn't help efficiency."

Brookvale remained the administrative centre for Warringah until 1971 when the council resolved to commence the construction of a new Civic Centre in Dee Why. When the council eventually moved to the Civic Centre in 1973, the Shire Hall in Brookvale was threatened with demolition in the mid-1970s. Despite some calls for the historic hall to be saved and be used as a community centre, their efforts were to no avail and the hall was demolished in late 1978.

== See also ==
- List of town halls in Sydney
- Architecture of Sydney
