= Christopher Kringas =

Australian architect

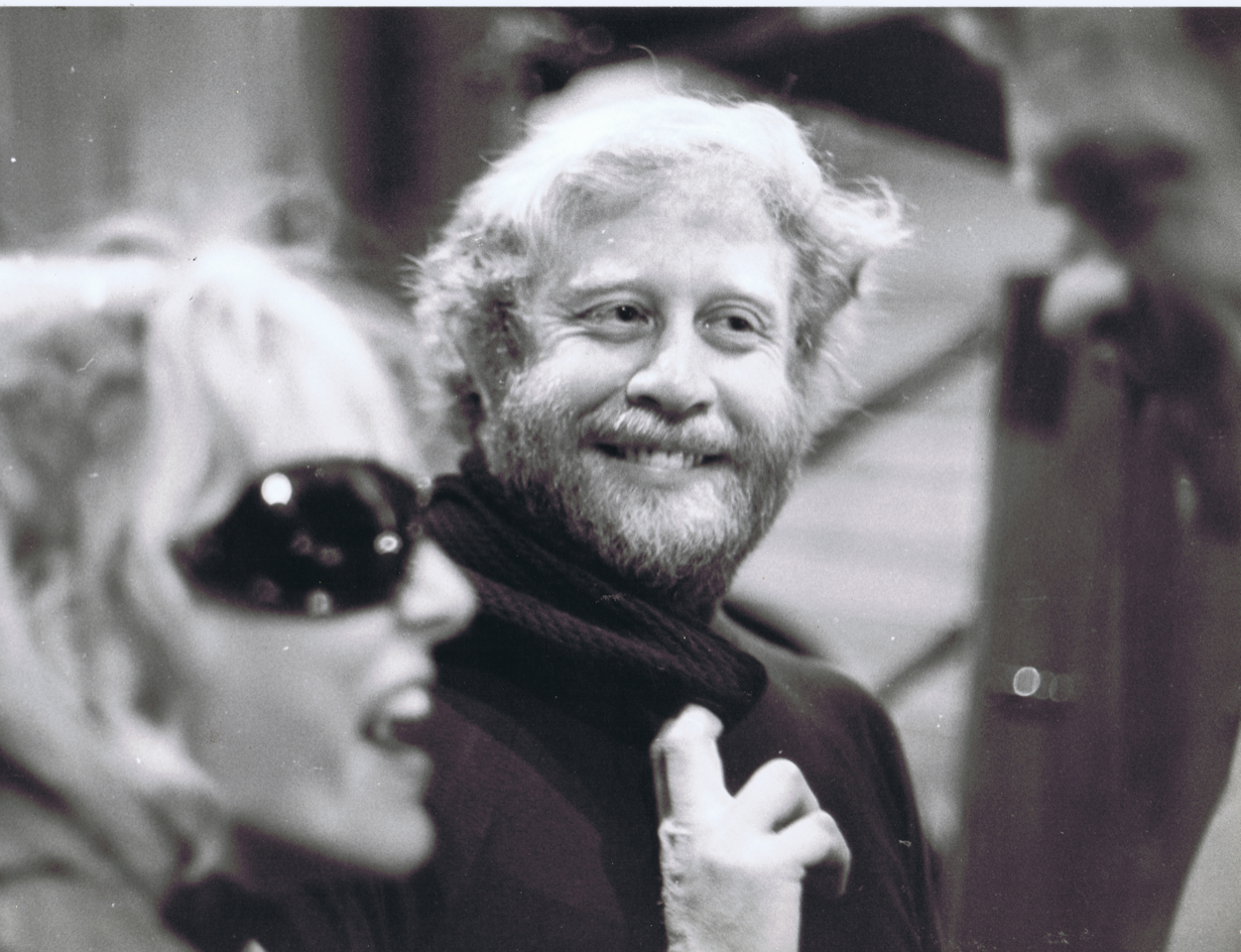
Christopher Kringas

Christopher Kringas (1936—1975) was an Australian architect. He is best known as the architect of the High Court of Australia.

The son of Greek migrants to Australia, Kringas grew up in Orange, New South Wales before studying architecture at the University of NSW. He received the Royal Australian Institute of Architects 'Outstanding Graduating Student' prize in 1959, then traveled to Europe and worked at the London County Council Architect's Department – seen as the "melting pot" of the New Brutalism movement in architecture and an incubator of seminal postwar architects.

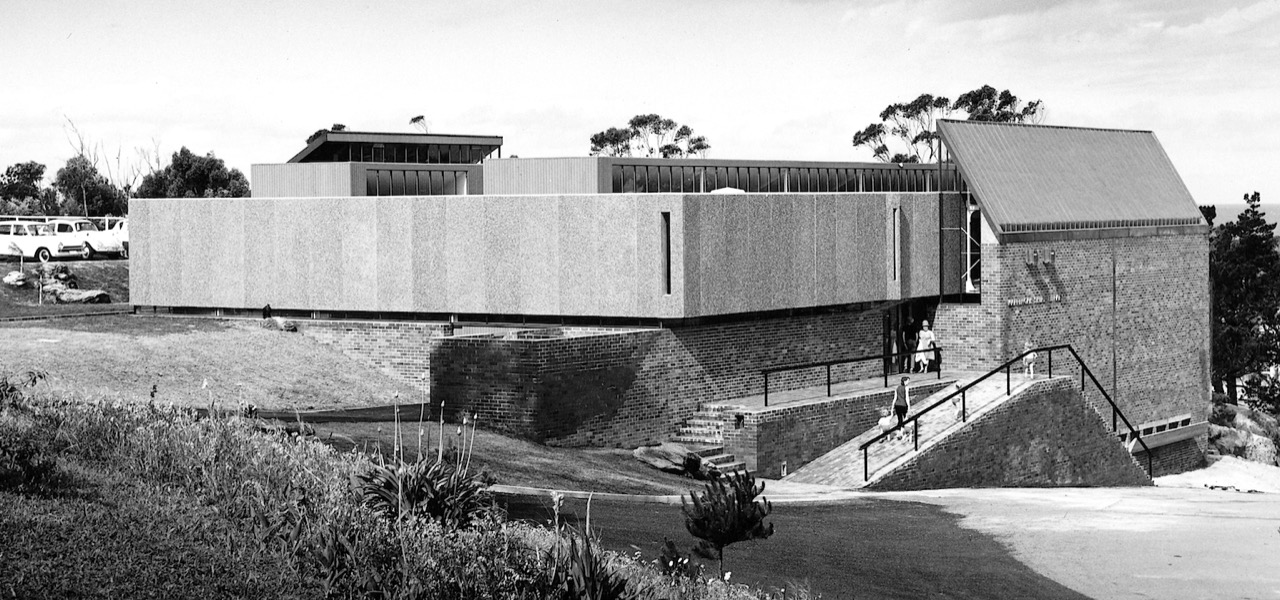
Dee Why Library - 1966 (Photo by David Moore)

Kringas returned to Sydney in 1962 and worked briefly at Budden Nangle & Michael architects, designing the Cockle House. In 1964, he joined the firm of Edwards Madigan Torzillo Briggs and, with the firm's senior director Colin Madigan, designed a series of significant Australian architectural works: the Dee Why Library; the Warren Library; Australian National Gallery Winning Competition Design; the Mitchell College Student Residences; and the Warringah Civic Centre. These innovative and acclaimed designs marked a new direction for the firm, distinct from its earlier orthodox Modernist productions. In 1966, Kringas was made an associate and in 1972 he became a director of the firm. Over the same period, Kringas produced a body of original solo works for private clients, including the Citroën Workshop, the J Kringas House and the Stevens House – described as an "individual masterwork".

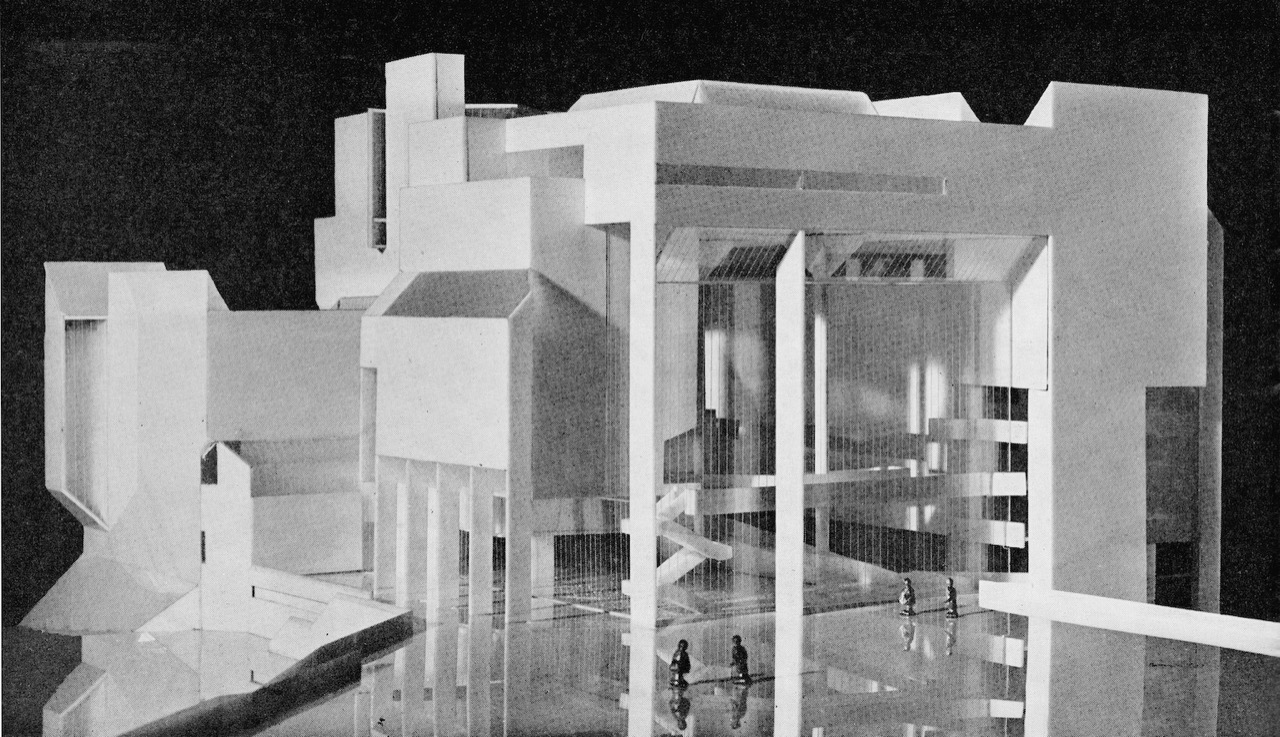
High Court Competition Model - 1973 (Photo by Max Dupain)

From 1972 to 1974, Kringas designed the High Court of Australia, leading the team of Feiko Bouman, Rod Lawrence and Michael Rolfe (architects) and Aldis Birzulis (structural engineer), to win the open national competition. In 1973, the National Times described Kringas alongside Harry Seidler and John Andrews as the "best and brightest" of Australian architects.

In March 1975, Kringas died of bowel cancer – 12 days before the construction of the High Court began – aged 38. Director and close friend Hans Marelli oversaw the faithful execution of Kringas's design. The High Court as constructed is virtually identical to the winning competition design. A plaque in the public hall commemorates Kringas's role as the designer of the High Court.

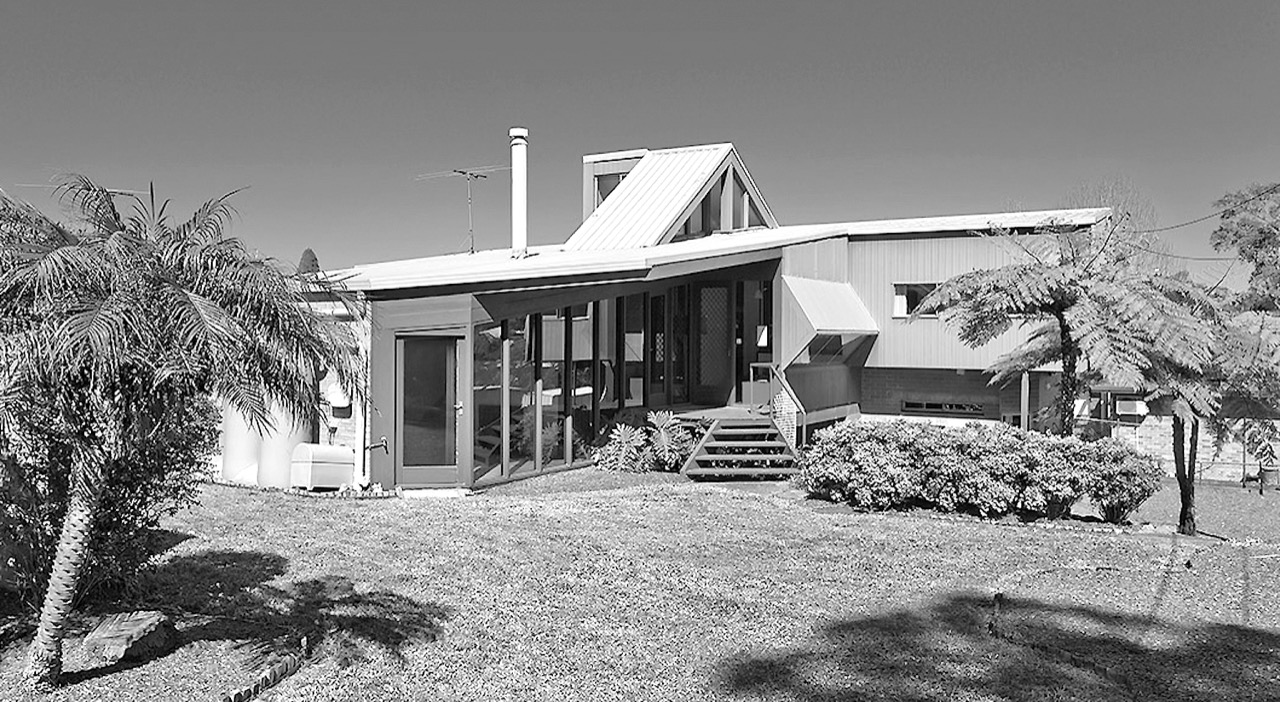
J Kringas House - 1967

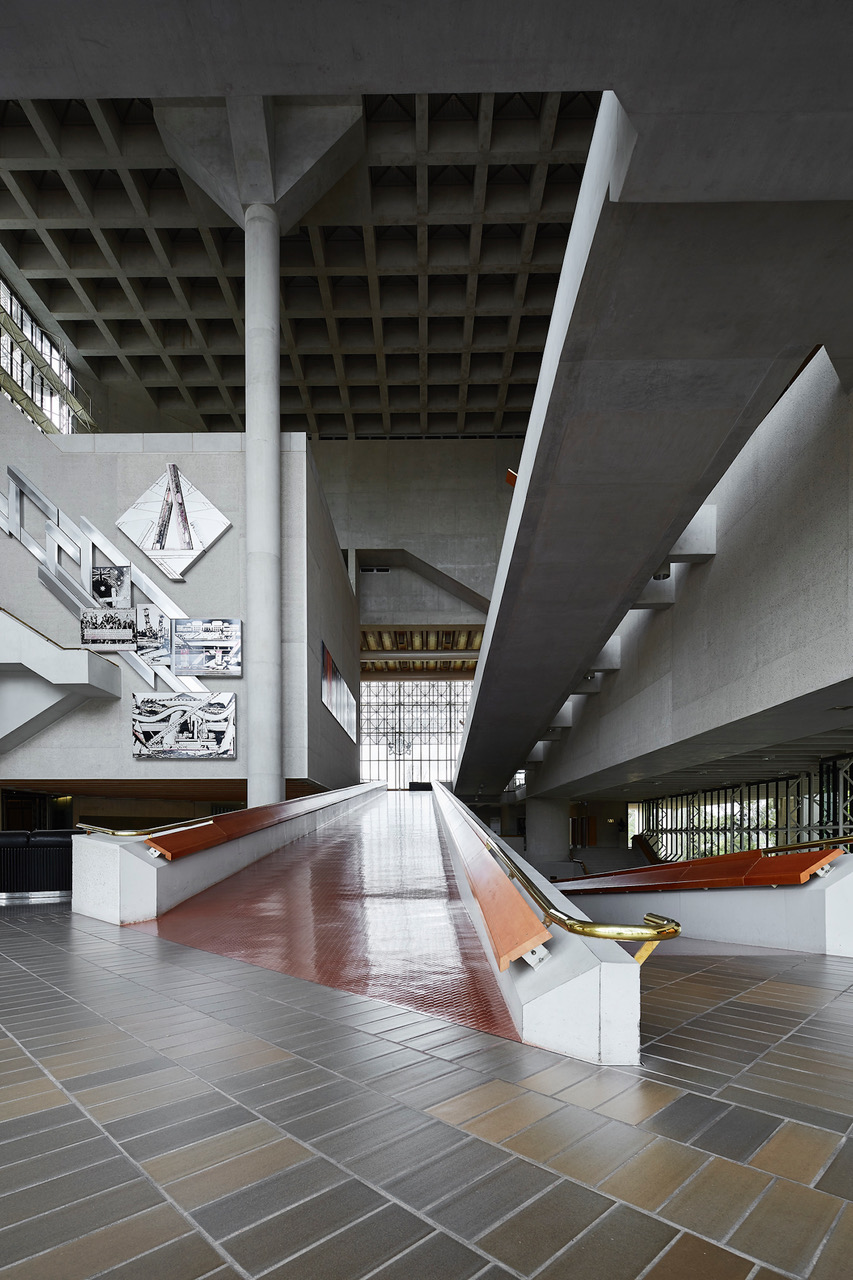
High Court of Australia (Photo by Anthony Basheer)

== Designs ==
- Cockle House, Hunters Hill NSW Australia – 1962 (with Budden Nangle & Michael architects)
- Citroën Workshop, Forrestville NSW Australia – 1966
- Dee Why Library, Dee Why NSW Australia – 1966 (with Edwards Madigan Torzillo & Briggs)
- J Kringas House – Killarney Heights NSW Australia – 1967
- Warren Library, Warren NSW Australia, 1968 (with Edwards Madigan Torzillo & Briggs)
- Australian National Gallery Winning Competition Design, Canberra ACT Australia – 1968 (with Edwards Madigan Torzillo & Briggs)
- Stevens House – Richmond QLD Australia – 1969
- Mitchell College Student Residences, Bathurst NSW Australia – 1970 (with Edwards Madigan Torzillo & Briggs)
- Warringah Civic Centre, Dee Why NSW Australia – 1970 (with Edwards Madigan Torzillo & Briggs)
- Lend Lease Urban Development (unbuilt) - Perth WA Australia - 1970 (with Edwards Madigan Torzillo & Briggs)
- National Gallery of Australia, Canberra Australia – 1971 (with Edwards Madigan Torzillo & Briggs)
- High Court of Australia, Canberra ACT Australia – Design 1972 to 1974, Construction 1975-1980 (with Edwards Madigan Torzillo & Briggs)
