= Feiko Bouman =

Dutch Australian architect and author

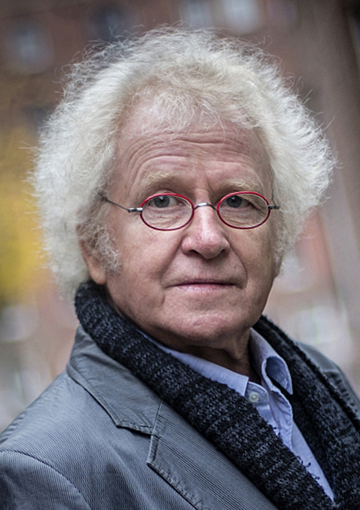
- Born: 10 June 1944 (age 81)
- Occupation: Architect
- Website: www.feikobouman.com.au

Feiko Bouman (born 10 June 1944) is a Dutch Australian architect and author, best known for his outback museum, The Australian Stockman’s Hall of Fame, Longreach Queensland. The building was opened by Queen Elizabeth in 1988.

== Early life ==
Bouman was born in Groningen, Netherlands. His family emigrated to Australia when he was 7 years old. Initially there were difficult beginnings living in distant Menangle Park, followed by then primitive circumstances in Oxford Falls, before the family settled in the Manly area. His education started at Manly Primary School, then Manly Boys High School, situated in North Curl Curl.

== Architecture career ==
Bouman studied architecture at University of NSW, after gaining a Commonwealth scholarship, graduating in 1966. Some years in London followed, including working in the office of Owen Luder Partnership as Design Architect. Back in Sydney, Bouman worked with Colin Madigan in the office of Edwards Madigan Torzillo and Briggs from 1969-1975, initially as Design Architect, and later Associate Director. While in this office he joined with Christopher Kringas, to win the Australia-wide competition for the High Court of Australia Building. In 1976 he commenced his own architectural practice in Balmain.

== Architecture milestones / achievements ==
1973	High Court of Australia Building, Canberra. Design team for successful competition entry
1973—1975	Supervising architect for the High Court of Australia and National Gallery of Australia, Canberra
1976	Commenced practice as Feiko Bouman Architecture
1979	Finalist in National Design competition for Australian Archives Building-Canberra
1979—1980	Winning entry in RAIA National Design competition for The Australian Stockman’s Hall of Fame and Outback Heritage Centre
1987	Winning entry in limited competition for new Council Chambers/Offices and Shearers Strike Interpretation Centre-Barcaldine, Queensland (not constructed)
1988	Winning entry in limited competition for Manly Council Civic Centre and Library
1988—1990	Winning entry in limited competition for Penrith Council Civic Centre and Library

== Key / significant works ==
Most of Feiko Bouman’s work has been in the public arena. Very few private housing projects are part of his portfolio.

=== High Court of Australia, Canberra ===
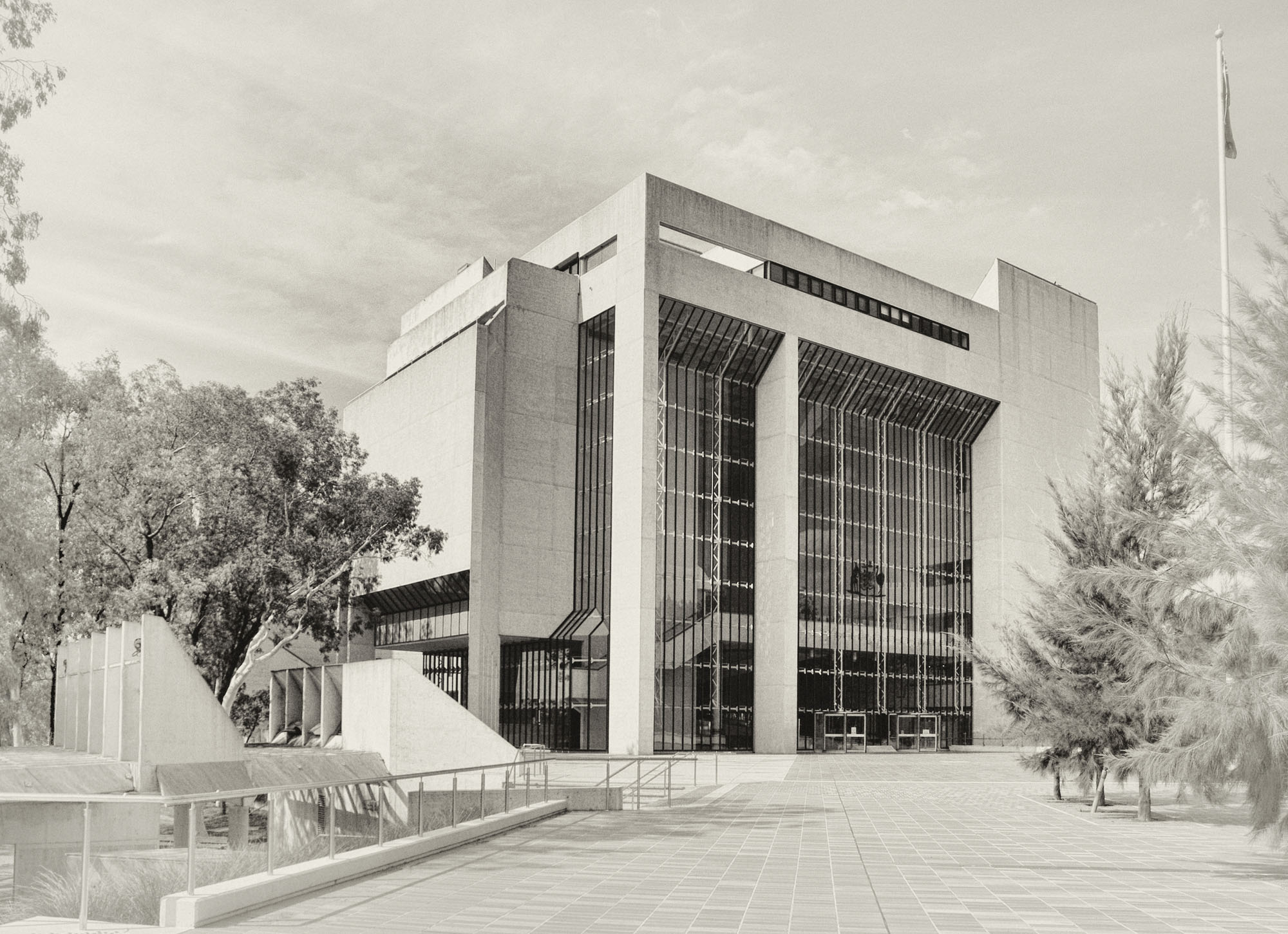
High Court of Australia, Canberra

The High Court of Australia is listed on the World Register of Significant 20th Century Architecture. It has been commented that; the major central space, with inviting access ramps, the clarity of court layout and visitor patterning, is one of the great public spaces in Australia. During the making of the 2012 video sessions, to document the history of the High Court, Chief Justice Robert French arranged for Feiko Bouman to receive a bronze commemorative medallion, in recognition of his original design co-authorship. In May 2021, The High Court of Australia held a function in the building, to celebrate 40+ years since construction completion. Chief Justice Susan Kiefel invited Bouman to make a speech to record the history of its genesis /creation, from the architectural competition to the start of on-site construction. The speech can be seen here.

=== Stockman’s Hall of Fame, Longreach, Queensland ===
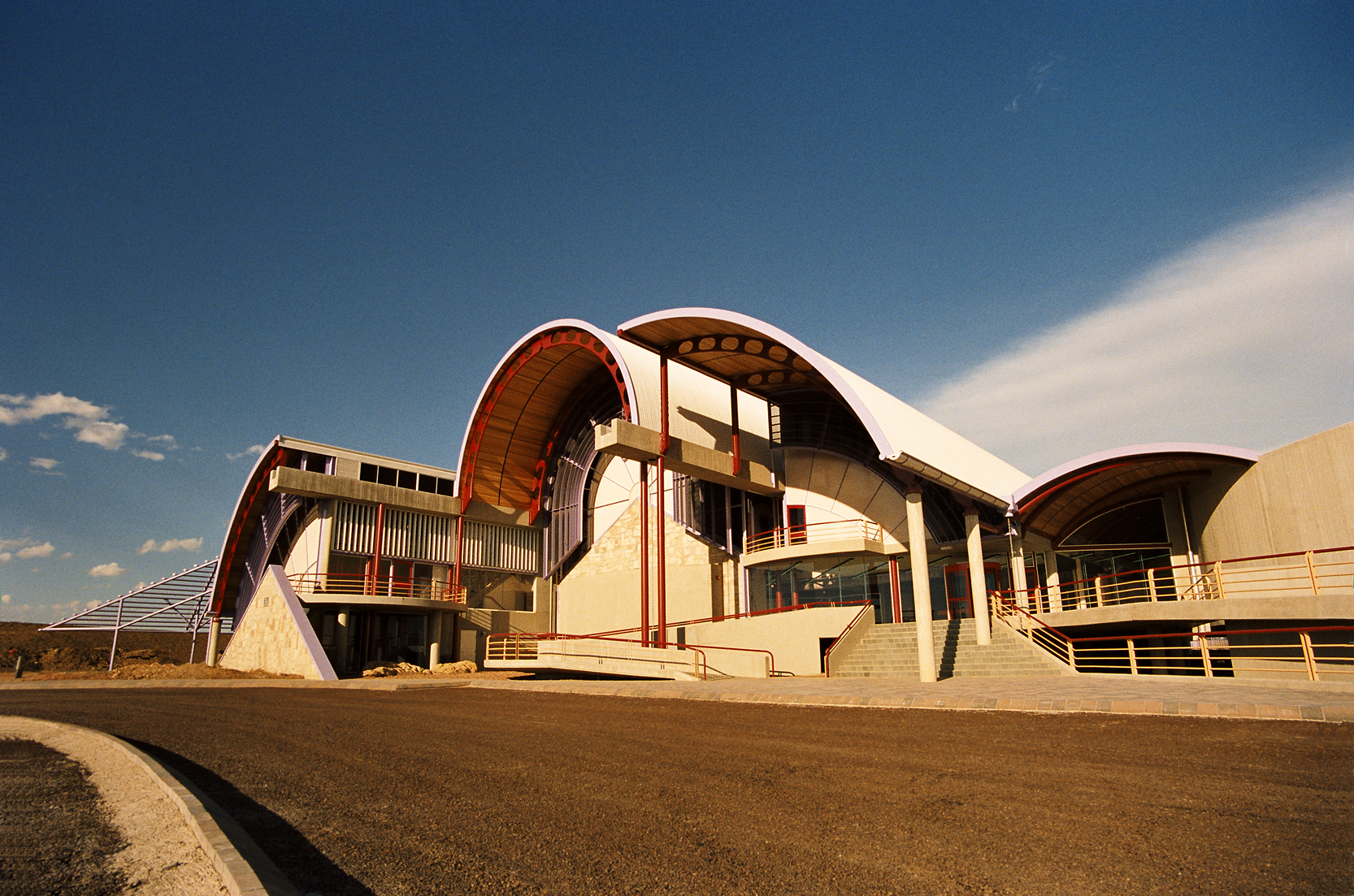
Stockman’s Hall of Fame, Longreach

This now iconic outback museum has been reviewed, photographed and commented upon extensively in many forums, publications and video media. Despite its relatively remote location, hundreds of thousands of visitors have made the trek.

Architectural historian, Philip Drew, has written many articles in architecture journals, as well as in mainstream media. He has commented that " the museum is a building which dares to project its own special image, an image that gains in strength from its interaction with the landscape." And "Bouman’s innovation rests on his insight in recognising that the asymmetrical composition of Utzon’s Opera House could be translated into a series of parallel vaults.". John Lahey, writing in The Age, surprised with his early commentary piece: "Opera House of the Outback" ... "we in the south have undervalued this project. It is a love song in corrugated steel” and correctly predicted that thousands, millions will visit the Hall of Fame".

=== North Sydney Oval, North Sydney Civic Centre and Library ===
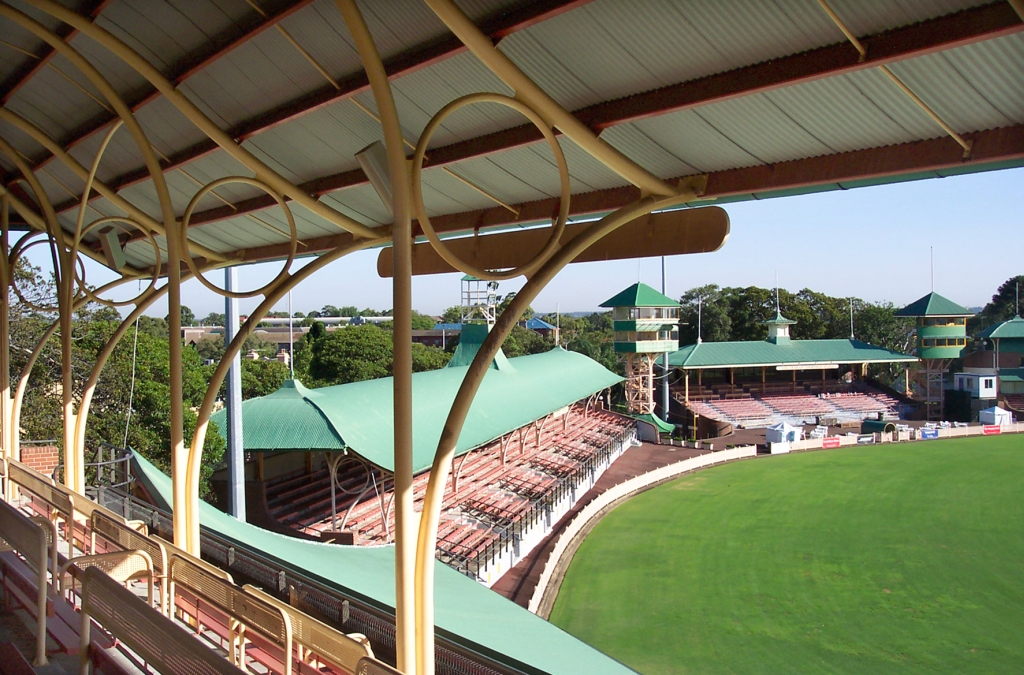
North Sydney Oval

From 1980 to 1988 Ted Mack was mayor of North Sydney Council. During this time, Feiko Bouman carried out and built many major transformative works in the municipality. The Council selected Bouman’s firm from several other submissions, primarily based upon the design quality of, The Stockman’s Hall of Fame. In 2007, Ted Mack launched the book ‘Feiko Bouman Architecture’ and in his launch speech tells a detailed story of the struggles to achieve worthwhile initiatives in local politics. His speech can be seen here.

John Haskell, architectural critic, writing in The Sydney Morning Herald, has described this contribution as "conferred a distinctive visual identity on North Sydney...and...refreshingly free of fads and fashion". The Civic Centre project started modestly; repairing a vacant site next to the Council Chambers, providing a dedicated park and other community facilities. Later the distinctive Civic Centre Offices and Library were built. Around that time, progressively, seven major new buildings were designed and constructed, at North Sydney Oval. The spaces underneath the new stands were used for income-producing activities, including, a colonnade of shops, office space, function rooms and child care centre. Creative modern use of steelwork featured strongly in these buildings, as it would in many other Bouman designs. A child-care centre project in Crows Nest was another innovative project, which has an earth/grass covered roof, publicly accessible and contributes to parkland in the area. It is very energy efficient.

=== Manly Civic Centre and Library ===
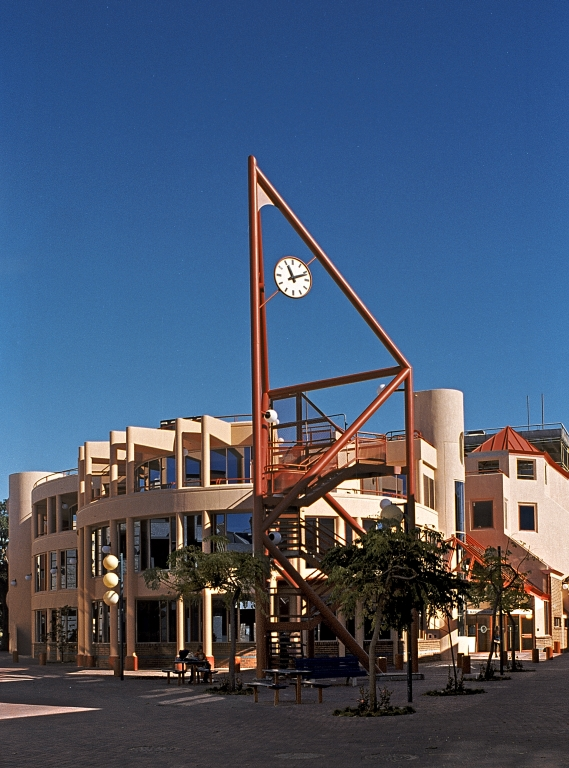
Manly Civic Centre and Library

The Library building was designed as the first stage of a major redevelopment, on a very restricted and isolated site. It initiated a revitalisation of the area and resolves some complex planning problems.

=== Penrith Civic Centre and Library ===
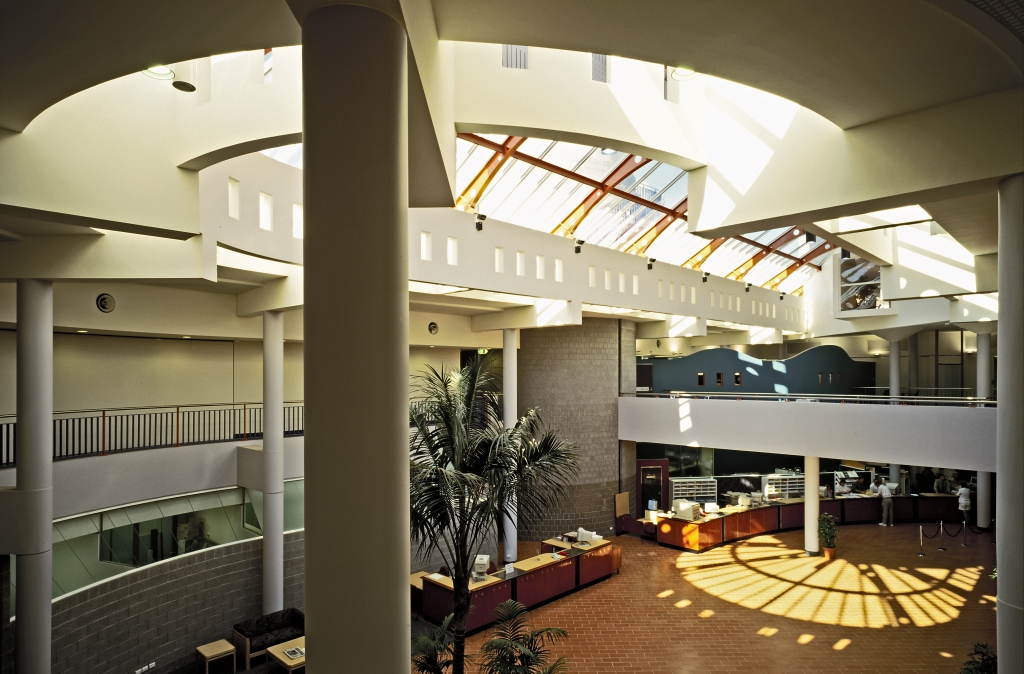
Penrith Civic Centre and Library

Penrith is the centre of a fast-growing area, west of Sydney, rapidly becoming a place of regional significance. Council operated from 4 separate buildings and there was an obvious need to centralise its activities. The completed complex has a strong presence, intended to express developing confidence. Elizabeth Farrelly, in the Sydney Morning Herald, wrote ... "people who work in the Civic Centre lyricise over the sense of endless discovery it brings, and the bytes of surprise visual joy.". She also poses the interesting question ..."Can a building, especially a public building, be liked-loved even-by all inhabitants and not be good architecture?"

=== Quadrant apartments, Milsons Point ===
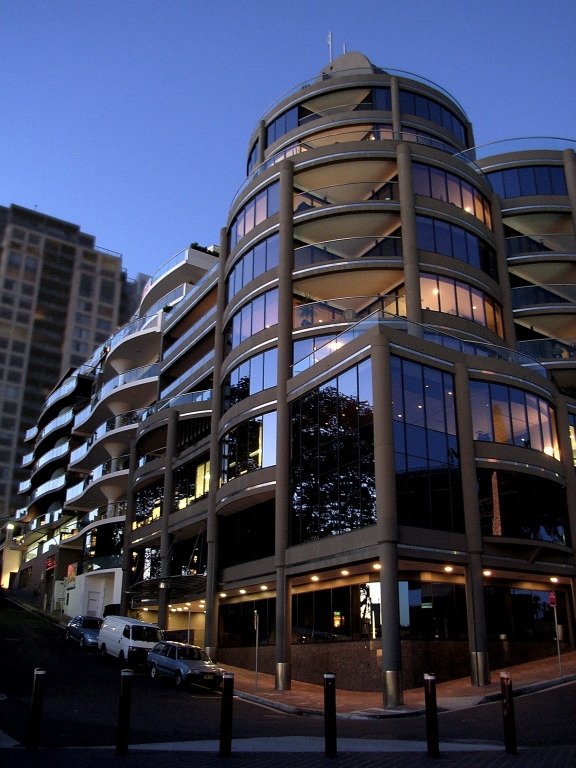
Quadrant Apartments, Milsons Point

A landmark building at the northern edge of Sydney Harbour, diagonally opposite the Sydney Opera House. It is now part of an adjacent group of three buildings, all designed by Feiko Bouman. Professor Laszlo Kollar has commented ...” the proposal Quadrant, Milsons Point, follows a timeless theme of architecture which is the transformation of the square on the ground into the circle in the sky. This “marriage” between the square and the circle is the theme of a great number of mankind’s most significant buildings in the East and West...a remarkable contemporary example"

=== Steel Treehouse, Killcare Beach ===
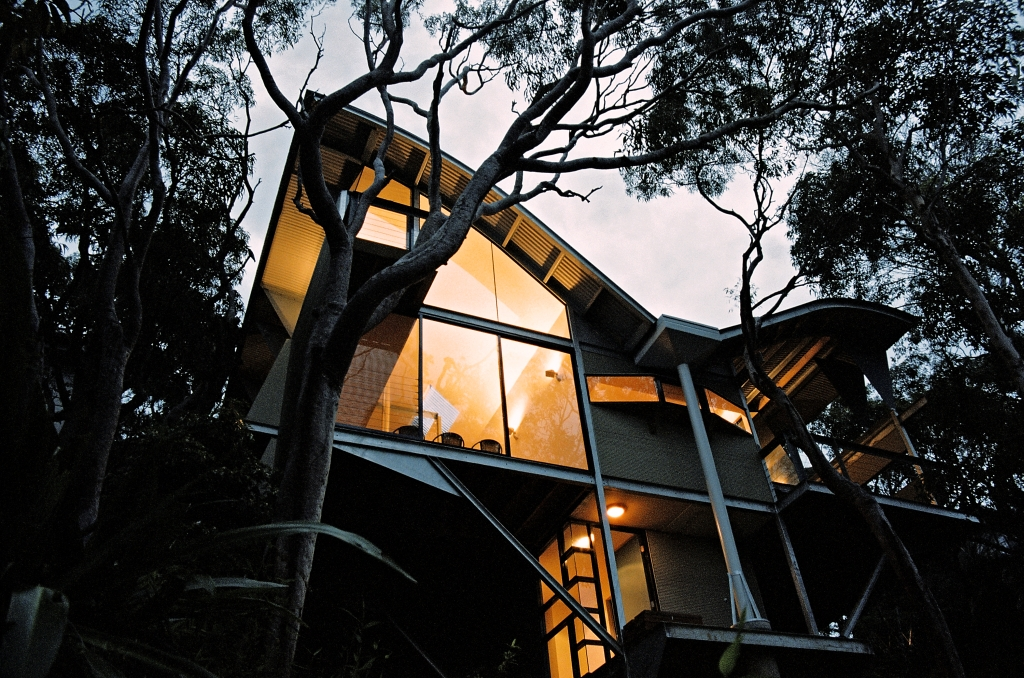
Steel Treehouse, Killcare Beach

The overriding approach of the design, was to have minimal impact on the natural beauty of the site. It is virtually a treehouse, constructed on a central core, with large cantilevers extending from the centre. Steel construction is very appropriate for a bushfire-prone area and is further enhanced through the specific roof design. Conventional gutters have been eliminated; through the device of the major curved roof forms, directly flowing onto a “flat” tapered tray system, allowing positive water and leaf run-off, into just one large downpipe, which empties into a grated sump. There are three connected “pavilions” for balance between communal and private areas.

== Books ==
1. Bouman, Feiko (2008), Feiko Bouman architecture, WriteLight for F. Bouman, ISBN 9780977563913
2. Bouman, Feiko (2016), Omgekeerde Wereld (in Dutch), Koninklijke Van Gorcum, ISBN 9789023255109 - Dutch translation upside-down world
3. Bouman, Feiko (2018), Urban Peasant, Austin & Macauley Publishers, London, ISBN 9781788480345

== Articles in the media ==
1. John Lahey, "Opera House of the Outback", The Age, 31 July 1987
2. John Haskell, "North Sydney Oval", Sydney Morning Herald, 18 March 1987
3. Professor John Haskell, "North Sydney discovers its own Wren", Sydney Morning Herald, 22 February 1989
4. Philip Drew, "Outback Cathedral", Architecture Bulletin, August edition 1988
5. Philip Drew, "Mother Cylinder", Architecture Bulletin, August edition 1988
6. "North Sydney ... first in child care design", The Northern Herald, 16 June 1988
7. Peter Ward, "Robust Penrith Civic Centre", The Weekend Australian, 16–17 April 1994
8. E M Farrelly, "Penrith defies the westie cringe", Sydney Morning Herald, 17 October 1995
9. Gwenda Edwards, "The Greenhouse effect/Killcare", The Daily Telegraph, 6 February 1999
10. Jenny Wills, "Dutch courage", The Sunday Telegraph, 31 August 2003
11. Tone Wheeler "AAA looks at Penrith Civic Centre and Library", Architecture & Design, 27 February 2020
12. Jesse "Bouman’s Career in Hardback", Indesignlive, 30 October 2007
