= Glebe Town Hall =

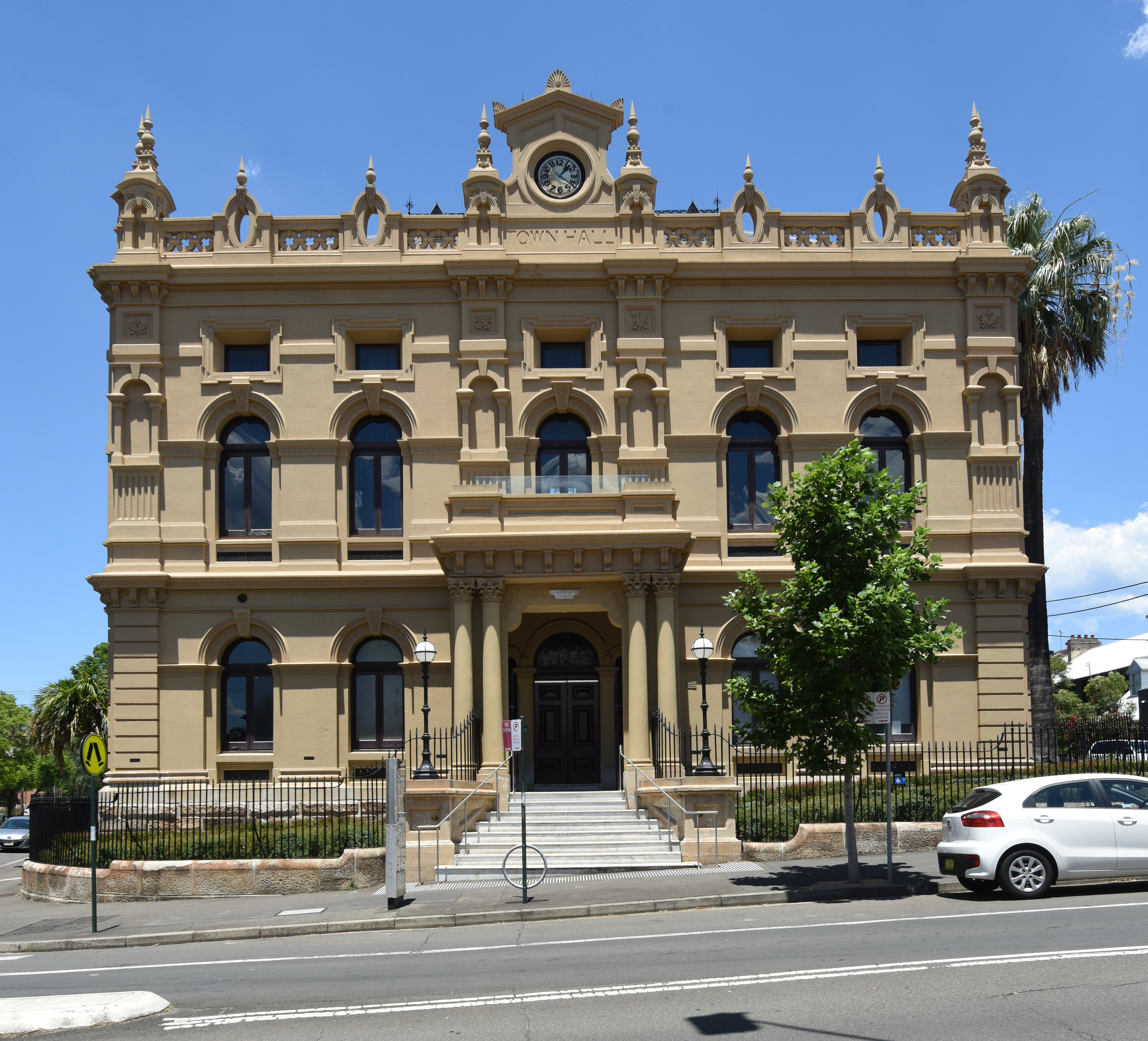
- Glebe Town Hall, following its restoration, in 2018.

General information
- Type: Government town hall
- Architectural style: Victorian Italianate
- Location: 160 St Johns Road, Glebe, New South Wales, Australia
- Coordinates: 33°52′57″S 151°11′06″E
- Construction started: 1879
- Completed: 24 June 1880
- Renovated: 1889–1891; 1988–1989; 2008–2013
- Client: The Glebe Borough Council
- Owner: City of Sydney (current)

Design and construction
- Architect: Ambrose Thornley
- Main contractor: Sanbrook and Sons

Renovating team
- Architects: Otto Cserhalmi and Partners (1988); Tonkin Zulaikha Greer (2008)
- Renovating firm: Stonehill Restorations Pty Ltd (1988)

The Glebe Town Hall is a landmark civic building in Glebe, a suburb of Sydney, Australia. It stands at 160 St Johns Road and was built in 1880 in the Victorian Italianate style by architect Ambrose Thornley. The Town Hall was the seat of The Glebe Municipal Council from 1880 to 1948 when it became a community centre and hall run by the City of Sydney. After being transferred to the Municipality of Leichhardt in 1968, it was returned to the control of the City of Sydney following a boundary change on 8 May 2003.

The City of Sydney Council commissioned extensive restoration works in 2008, which were completed in 2013, and the hall is now listed on the heritage register of the City of Sydney as "representative as the seat of local metropolitan government for Glebe Municipality, the fourth municipality to be incorporated under The Municipalities Act of 1858." The building is also listed on the (now defunct) Register of the National Estate.

== History and description ==
With the establishment of The Glebe Municipality on 1 August 1859, the council first met in the long room of a local hotel, but a few months later moved to a house which Chairman George Wigram Allen had placed at their disposal until a purpose-built cottage was rented for the purposes of Municipal Chambers. In July 1879 the council approved a £5000 design for a new town hall located at the junction of St John's Road, Mount Vernon Street and Lodge Street, designed by prominent local architect, Ambrose Thornley.

The Town Hall, surmounted by a clock which had been donated by Sir George Wigram Allen, was completed along with a Council Clerk's residence at the rear, and opened on 24 June 1880 by Mayor Thomas Dunn, with The Sydney Morning Herald noting its appearance thus:

"It is elevated, and most suitable for a public building of this class, having three frontages — an important feature for architectural appearance. [...] It certainly is the finest building of the kind out of the city. The style of architecture is Italian, the principal front, to St. John's Road, being divided into three bays by means of quoins, &c., and the central feature is bold portico, approached by a flights of steps, which adds greatly to the general appearance of the design."

On its completion, The Evening News also noted the quality of the building and praised Thornley's design:

"the inhabitants of Glebe and neighbourhood can congratulate them-selves upon possessing a building not only ornamental, but useful and substantial as well, as the want of a large, central, and commodious room for meetings and concerts has long been much required. The work reflects the highest credit upon Mr. Thornley, jun., and those who have carried out the work under his directions and the inhabitants of Glebe may justly feel proud of their new Town Hall."

In 1889 the Glebe Council decided to extend the existing Town Hall to create an additional smaller Hall, Meeting Room and new Council Chambers, with their design also carried out by Ambrose Thornley in the same style. The new additions were located on the Mount Vernon Street side of the original building and consisted of new Council Chambers and meeting room on the ground floor. On 19 February 1916, a Roll of Honour memorial plaque for the Glebe residents killed during World War I was erected in the foyer of Town Hall "by the council, ratepayers and residents" of Glebe.

=== Later history and restoration ===
The chambers continued to serve as the administrative centre of Glebe until 1948, when The Glebe Municipality was amalgamated into the City of Sydney through the Local Government (Areas) Act 1948. The City of Sydney maintained the hall as a community centre and venue, which was continued by Leichhardt Council when they took possession following a boundary change in 1968. In August 1984, various green political groups met in the hall for the launching of the Greens New South Wales political party. Following a fire in June 1988 in the central stairwell which caused damage to the main hall, Leichhardt council made extensive repairs to the hall, overseen by architects Otto Cserhalmi and Partners and Stonehill Restorations builders, which were unveiled by Leichhardt mayor Doug Spedding in September 1989. The hall remained under the control of Leichhardt until 8 May 2003, when a further boundary change transferred large parts of Glebe and Forest Lodge back to the City of Sydney.

In 2008, the Lord Mayor of Sydney, Clover Moore, commissioned extensive restoration works to be undertaken by prominent conservation/restoration architectural firm, Tonkin Zulaikha Greer, which were completed and unveiled by Moore on 2 March 2013. The extensive restorations included a new Welsh slate roof, reconstruction of damaged parapets and finials, the reinstatement of the original natural ventilation system. A rainwater storage system was implemented, to be reused on site for the new habitat garden created for the endangered local Blue Wren. The rear of the town hall was also cleared to make way for a new lift and fire stair extension connecting all levels of the building and providing rear access. With the stripping-back of wall coverings in the main hall, pillars with ornate plaster carvings created using the Italian Sgraffito technique (similar in design to the interiors of the Santa Maria dei Miracoli, Venice) were uncovered and reinstated, making them one of the few surviving examples of the technique in Sydney.

On its reopening, Moore noted that "The City’s restoration has transformed the building into an accessible and sustainable community venue with modern facilities, while also highlighting its unique heritage features [...] The elegant rooms of the hall have played host to social and civic events throughout Glebe’s history, from wartime balls and evening concerts, to debating clubs and political meetings. Now that this $6.8 million project is complete, the hall can once again be enjoyed by the community now and into the future."

== Gallery ==
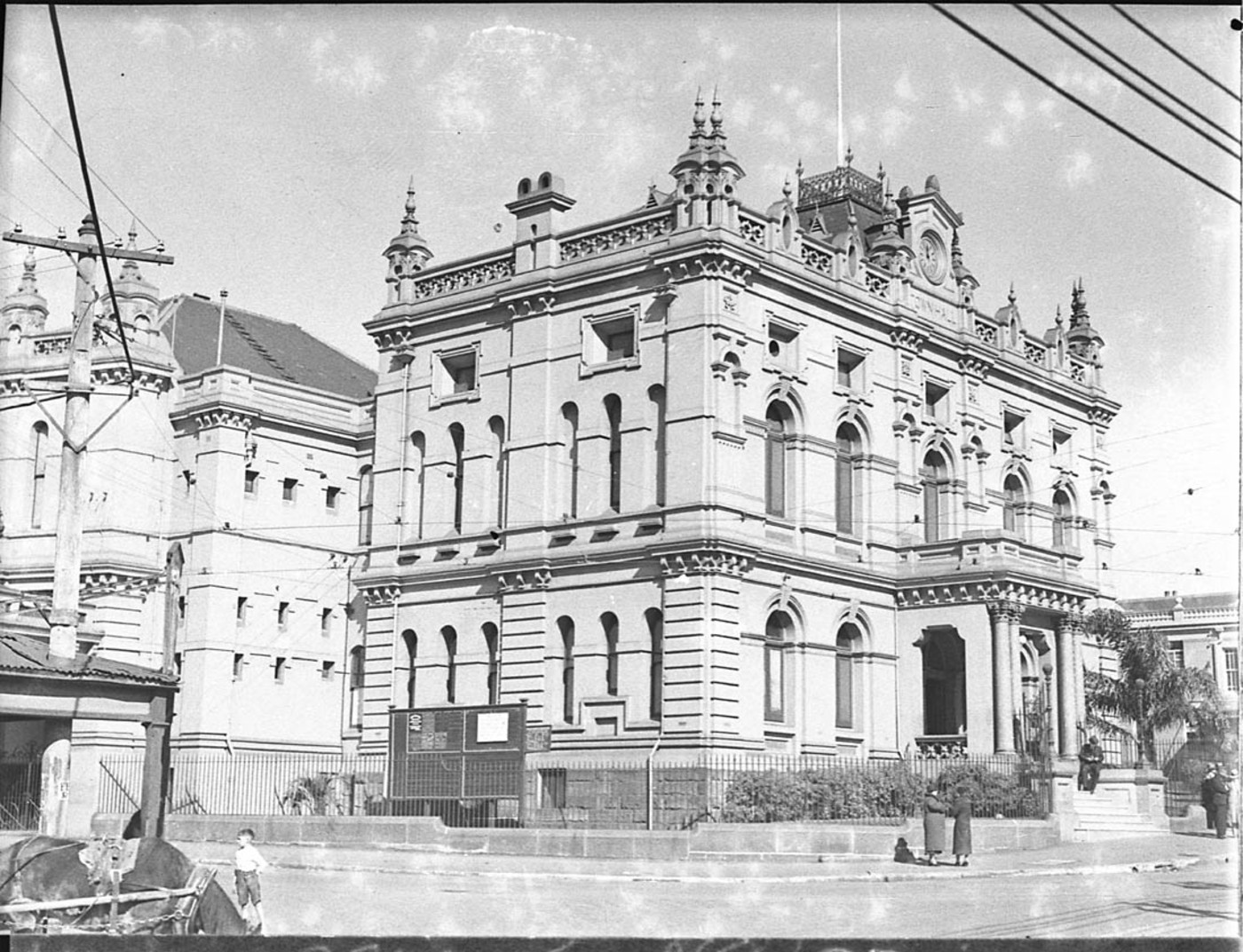
Town Hall photographed by Sam Hood on 21 May 1935, on the declaration of the seat of Glebe for the state election.

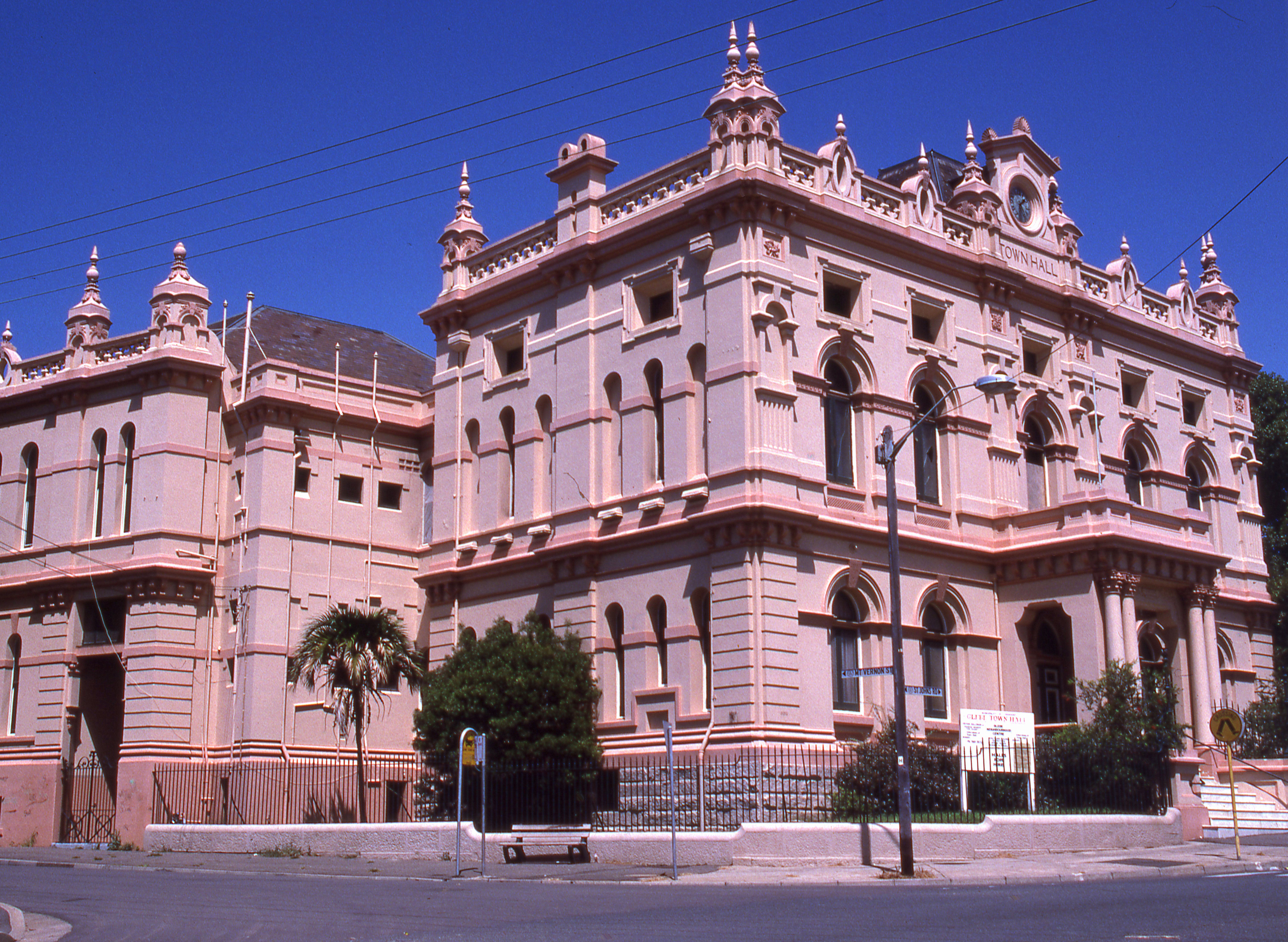
Glebe Town Hall in the 1980s

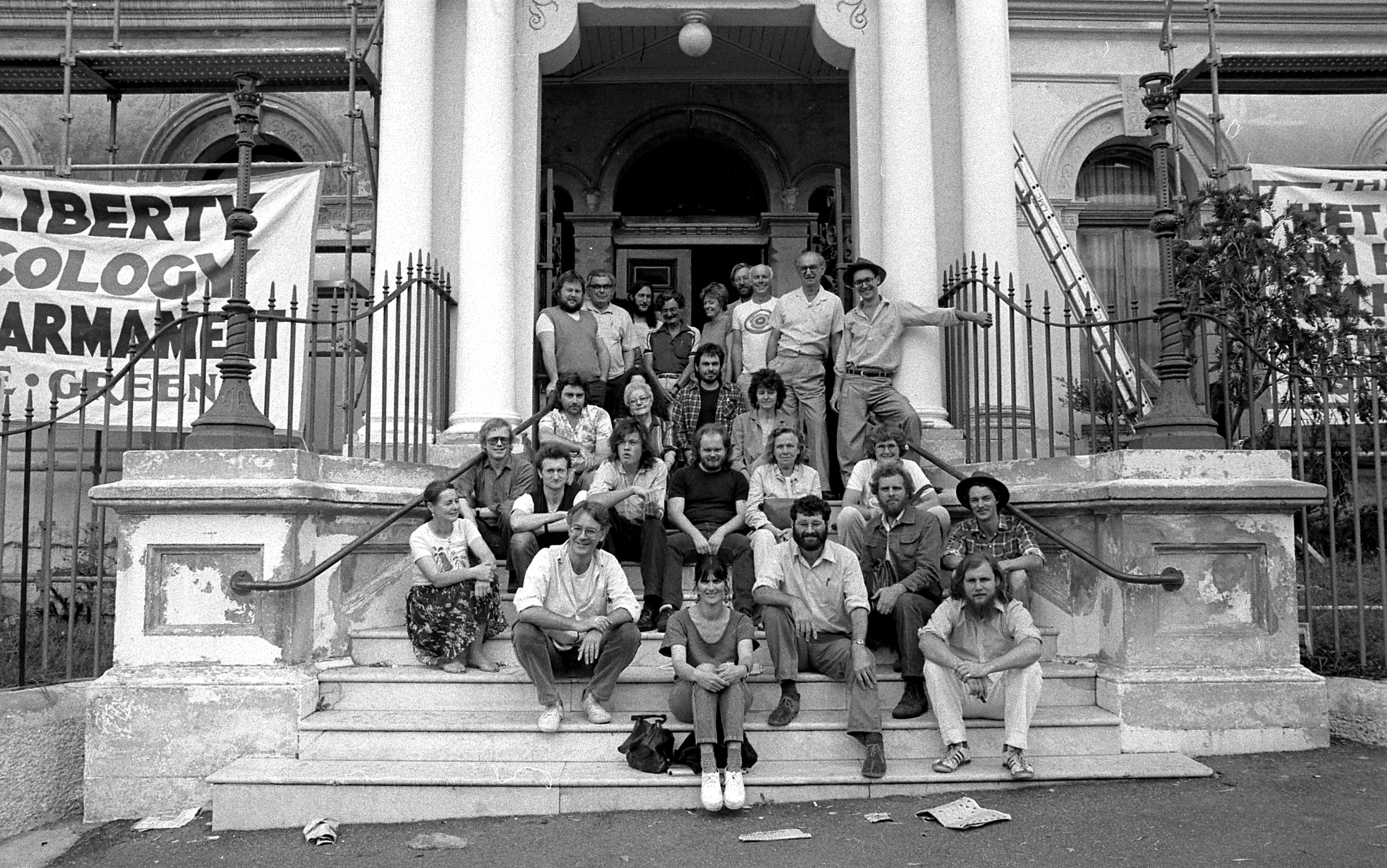
Members of the newly launched Greens NSW party on the front steps in August 1984.

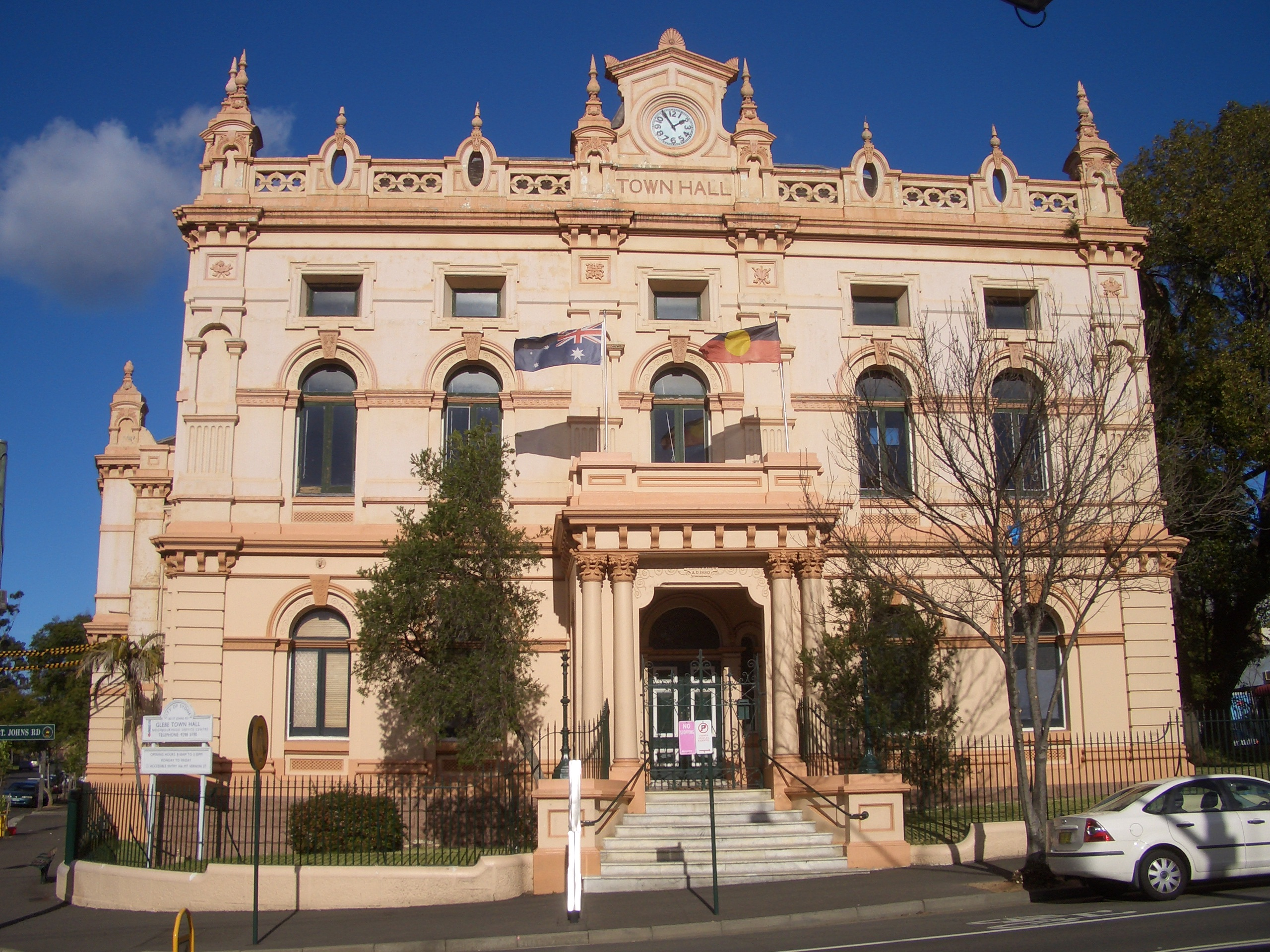
The Town Hall in 2007, prior to the restoration

== See also ==
- List of town halls in Sydney
- Architecture of Sydney
