= Colin Madigan =

Australian architect

Colin Madigan AO
- Born: 22 July 1921; Glen Innes, New South Wales
- Died: 17 September 2011 (aged 90); Bangalow, New South Wales, Australia
- Education: Sydney Technical College
- Occupation: Architect
- Awards: Sir John Sulman Medal; 1966, 1970 Royal Australian Institute of Architects Gold Medal; 1981
- Practice: Edwards Madigan Torzillo and Partners
- Buildings: National Gallery of Australia

Colin Frederick Madigan AO (22 July 1921 – 17 September 2011) was an Australian architect. He is best known for designing the National Gallery of Australia in Canberra.

== Biography ==
Born in Glen Innes, New South Wales, Madigan studied architecture at Sydney Technical College from 1939 to 1941. He enlisted in the Royal Australian Navy in 1941, and was one of the few survivors of the sinking of the corvette HMAS Armidale off Timor in 1942.

In 1951 Madigan, Maurice Edwards and Jack Torzillo formed the firm, Edwards Madigan Torzillo and Partners, whose work was mostly on public projects such as public housing, public libraries, schools and offices. A notable building from this period was the Warringah Council Library at Dee Why, New South Wales, which was awarded the Sir John Sulman Medal for architecture in 1966. In 1968, they won the design competition for the National Gallery of Australia. Later, Madigan supervised construction of the High Court of Australia Building after its designer Christopher Kringas died in March 1975, just prior to the start of construction in April 1975. The unsuccessful design for the new Australian Parliament House in Canberra was one of the shortlisted finalists in the architectural design competition.

He retired in 1989.

Madigan also wrote a book on the sinking of HMAS Armidale in 1942, Armidale '42 : a survivor's account.

In later years, Madigan vigorously opposed plans to build a new entrance to the National Gallery of Australia. He died, aged 90, in Bangalow, New South Wales on 17 September 2011, survived by his wife Ruby (née Court-Rice), their son Guy (born 1952) and a grandson.

== Honours ==
Madigan received a Gold Medal from the Royal Australian Institute of Architects in 1981.

He was appointed an Officer of the Order of Australia in the Australia Day Honours of 1984, and was awarded the Centenary Medal in 2001.
