= List of town halls in Sydney =

This is a list of town halls in Sydney, Australia, with local municipality listed after it. Its main town hall is the Sydney Town Hall.

- Alexandria
- Annandale
- Balmain
- Botany
- Darlington
- Erskineville
- Glebe
- Granville
- Hornsby
- Hunters Hill
- Leichhardt
- Manly
- Marrickville
- Newtown
- North Sydney
- Paddington
- Parramatta
- Petersham
- Randwick
- Redfern
- Rockdale
- Ryde
- Sydney Town
- Warringah
- Waterloo
- Willoughby
- Woollahra

== See also ==
- List of Sydney suburbs
- Local government areas of New South Wales
