= High Court of Australia Building =

High Court of Australia building
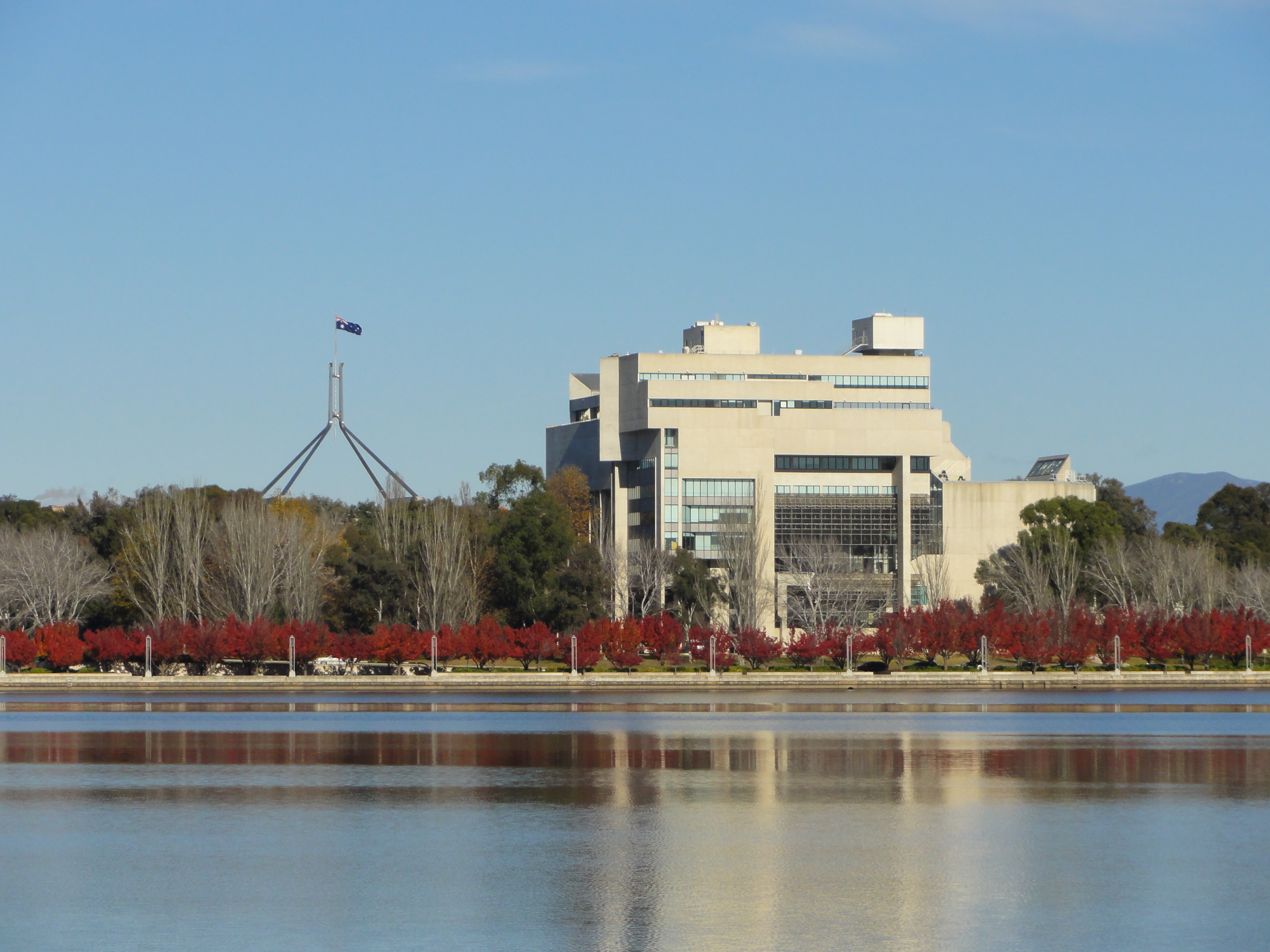
- High Court building, viewed across Lake Burley Griffin
- Interactive map of the High Court of Australia building area

General information
- Status: Completed
- Type: Court house
- Architectural style: Late Twentieth-Century Brutalist
- Location: Canberra, Australia, Parkes Place East, Parkes, ACT, Australia
- Coordinates: 35°17′56″S 149°08′08″E
- Current tenants: High Court of Australia
- Groundbreaking: September 1975
- Construction started: April 1975
- Completed: April 1980
- Opened: June 1980
- Inaugurated: 26 May 1980; 46 years ago by Queen Elizabeth II
- Cost: A$46.5 million
- Owner: Australian Government

Height
- Height: 40 m (130 ft)

Dimensions
- Other dimensions: 24-metre-high (79 ft) atrium

Technical details
- Floor count: 11
- Floor area: 18,515 m^{2} (199,290 sq ft)

Design and construction
- Architect: Christopher Kringas
- Architecture firm: Edwards Madigan Torzillo Briggs
- Structural engineer: Miller Milston and Ferris
- Services engineer: Frank Taplin and Partners (mechanical/hydraulic); Addicoat Hogarth Wilson Pty Ltd (electrical/fire); Peter R. Knowland and Associates (acoustics)
- Quantity surveyor: DR Lawson and Associates
- Main contractor: PDC Construction ACT Pty
- Awards: Canberra Medallion, The Royal Australian Institute of Architects (1980)

Other information
- Number of rooms: Public Hall; 3 Courtrooms

Website
- hcourt.gov.au

Commonwealth Heritage List
- Official name: High Court of Australia, King Edward Tce, Parkes, ACT, Australia
- Type: Listed place
- Criteria: A., E., F., G., H.
- Designated: 22 June 2004
- Reference no.: 105557

The High Court of Australia building is located on the shore of Lake Burley Griffin in Canberra's Parliamentary Triangle. It has been the permanent home of the High Court of Australia since 1980. The High Court building was designed between 1972 and 1974 by the Australian architect Christopher Kringas (1936–1975) – a director of the firm Edwards Madigan Torzillo and Briggs – who is commemorated by a plaque in the public hall.

The building was constructed from 1975 to 1980 and opened by Queen Elizabeth II, on 26 May 1980. Its international architectural significance is recognised by the Union of International Architects (UIA). It received the Australian Institute of Architects Canberra Medallion in 1980 and the national Enduring Architecture Award in 2007. It was added to the Commonwealth Heritage List in 2004. The Court and its Principal Registry were transferred to the new building and the first sitting in this location took place in June 1980. The majority of the court's sittings have been held in Canberra since then.

== History ==
In the 1950s, Prime Minister Robert Menzies established a plan to develop Canberra and construct other important national buildings. A 1959 plan featured a new building for the High Court on the shore of Lake Burley Griffin, next to the location for the new Parliament House and the National Library of Australia. This plan was abandoned in 1968 and the location of the Parliament was moved, later settling on the present site on Capital Hill. In March 1968, the government announced that the court would move to Canberra.

In 1972, a national, anonymous, two-stage competition was initiated by the National Capital Development Commission, attracting 158 entries. The competition jury comprised Melbourne architect Daryl Jackson, Chief Justice Sir Garfield Barwick, NCDC Commissioner Sir John Overall, NSW Government Architect Ted Farmer and Australian National University Professor Peter Karmel. In 1973, Prime Minister Gough Whitlam declared the design submitted by architect Christopher Kringas of the firm of Edwards Madigan Torzillo Briggs as the winner. The competition team consisted of Kringas as leader and director in charge, assisted by architects Feiko Bouman and Rod Lawrence (both Stages); Michael Rolfe (Stage 1); and structural engineer Aldis Birzulis.

== Architecture ==
The design is a highly innovative architectural composition that extends the principles of Brutalism – a significant period of post war modern architecture internationally that emerged in the UK in the 1950s. After graduating architecture at the University of NSW in 1959, Kringas travelled to Europe and worked with the London County Council Architect's Department, seen as an epicentre of 'The New Brutalism'. Kringas joined the firm of Edwards Madigan Torzillo Briggs in 1964 and, with Colin Madigan, designed a series of seminal architectural works including the 1967 Dee Why Library, the 1968 and 1971 designs for the Australian National Gallery and the 1971 Warringah Civic Centre, as well as innovative solo designs. Kringas died of cancer in March 1975, aged 38, just 12 days before the High Court construction began. Following his death, architect Hans Marelli continued as the project director until the completion of construction in 1980. The constructed High Court building is virtually identical to the winning 1973 Competition Design.

The High Court building arranges three courtrooms, Justices' chambers, the Court's main registry, library and administration facilities around an immense 24-metre-high (79 ft) public hall. A central public ramp system rises within the volume, connecting each component. The building is primarily constructed from bush-hammered reinforced concrete, forming an exposed monolithic structure. The bush-hammering is achieved by constructing the walls using formwork and hammering the concrete when the form work is removed. Large areas of glazing are supported on tubular steel frame structural back-ups. Careful attention has been paid to detailing, acoustics and natural light, which is admitted even in the courtrooms.

The High Court was designed to integrate with the edge of a vast elevated public plaza called ‘National Place’, which was to extend across the Parliamentary Triangle. However the NCDC later abandoned plans for National Place, leaving the High Court and National Gallery entries elevated above their surrounds.

== Interior ==
Internal finishes are rich yet restrained. Flooring is aurisina stone, pirelli rubber or carpet. Wall finishes are concrete, plaster or timber panelling. Ceilings are plywood panelling, timber battened, plaster or concrete. Australian timber is used throughout the building. Chief Justice Garfield Barwick maintained a keen interest in the building's design and construction.

Courtroom 1 is the main courtroom with an imposing timber panelled wall of red tulip oak from Queensland, 17.5 metres high. It also contains a long curved bench and bar table of jarrah timber. Blackwood panels are used in the ceiling. The Courtroom has a sound system reticulated to a room which accommodates court reporting services. It contains a woven tapestry incorporating the badges of the States and the Crest of the Commonwealth. Doors for each of the three courtrooms incorporate a special design, those of Courtroom No. 1 featuring a silvered bronze grid partly recessed and fixed into the laminated plate glass. The theme of the design is a shield, emphasising the Court's function as a protector of the Constitution and the liberties of the citizen. The door handles continue the emblematic design. Courtroom No. 2 is described as the "Working Courtroom", as it is the venue for the majority of hearings. It has similar wall panelling and fittings to No. 1 Courtroom, although the ceiling is of painted moulded plywood. Courtroom No 2 is also used for hearing applications for leave to appeal by video link. It therefore is fitted with special equipment for the transmission and reception of pictures and sound between the Courtroom and other cities in Australia. Courtroom No. 3 has been designed for cases which will be dealt with generally by a single Justice and is the smallest of the three courtrooms. It has a jury box so that a trial can be conducted on the rare occasions that such a case comes before the High Court. The Courtroom has been furnished with coachwood timber with a ceiling mainly of glass that provides a high level of natural lighting.

== Artwork ==
Specially commissioned art works complement the public hall as applied finishes or are integrated into the building's detailing. Included are the water feature designed by Robert Woodward, murals by Jan Senbergs forming an integral part of the public hall, doors at entry to Court 1 designed by Les Kossatz and George Baldessin and a wax mural by Bea Maddock in the public hall outside Courtroom 1. Photographic portraits of all Chief Justices and Justices who have sat on the Court since its inception are displayed along the wall outside Courtroom No. 1.

== Gallery ==
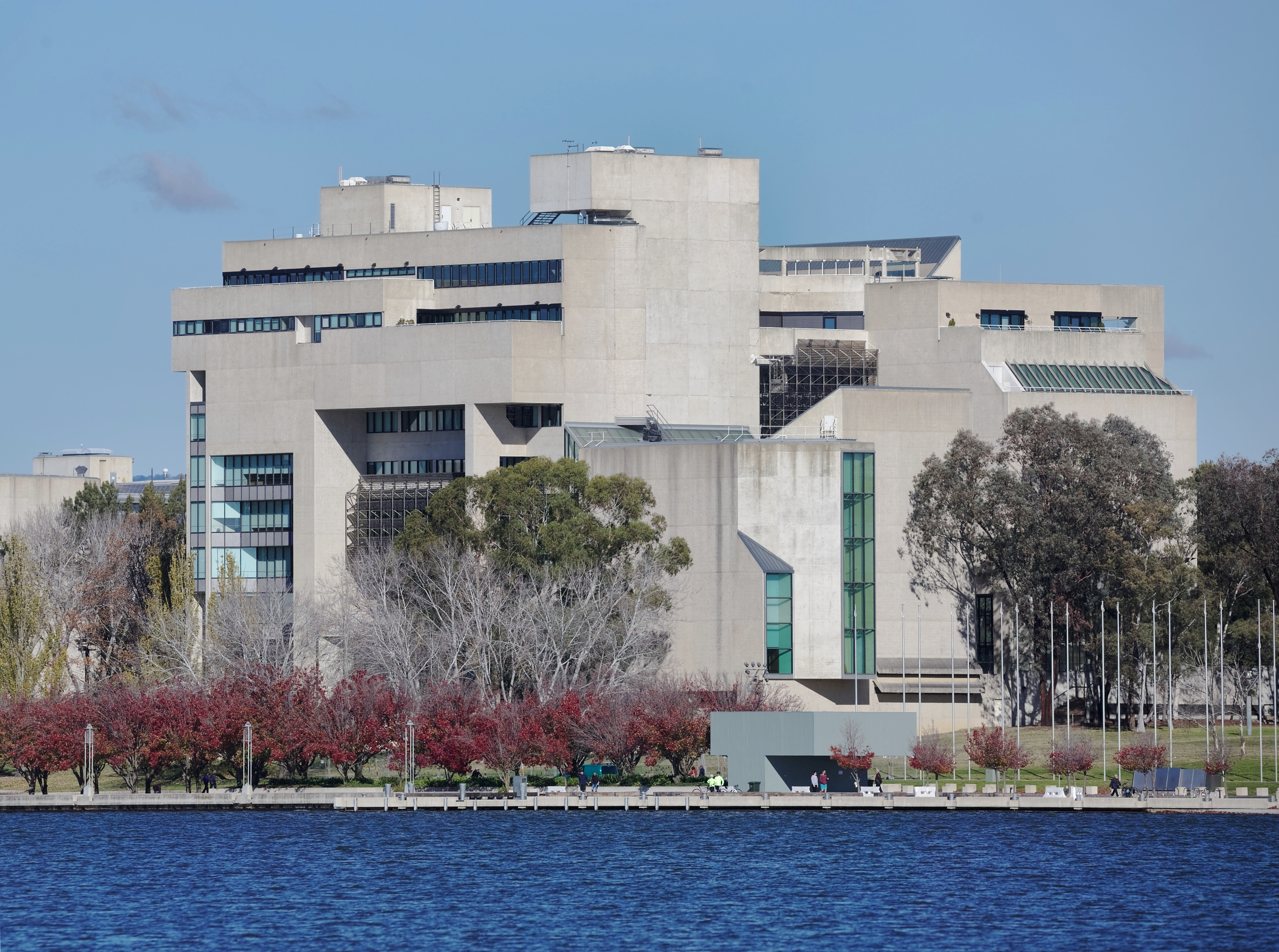
The Australian High Court, seen from across Lake Burley Griffin.

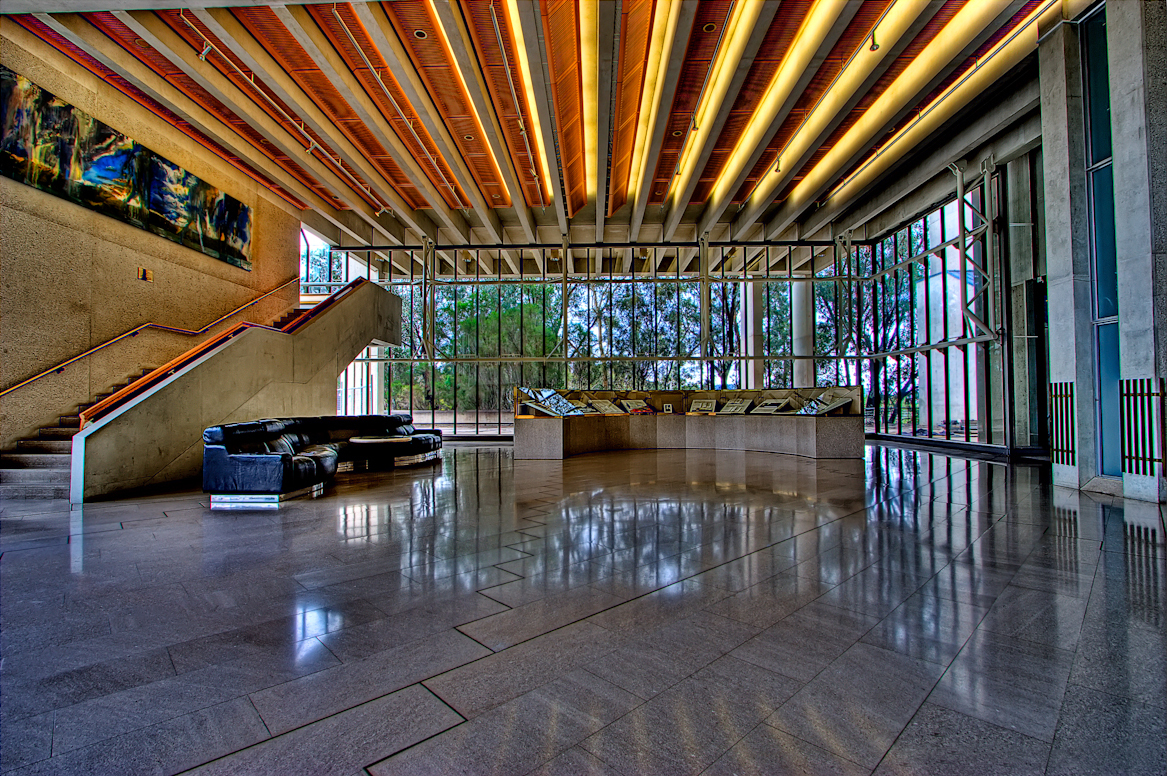
Entry hall

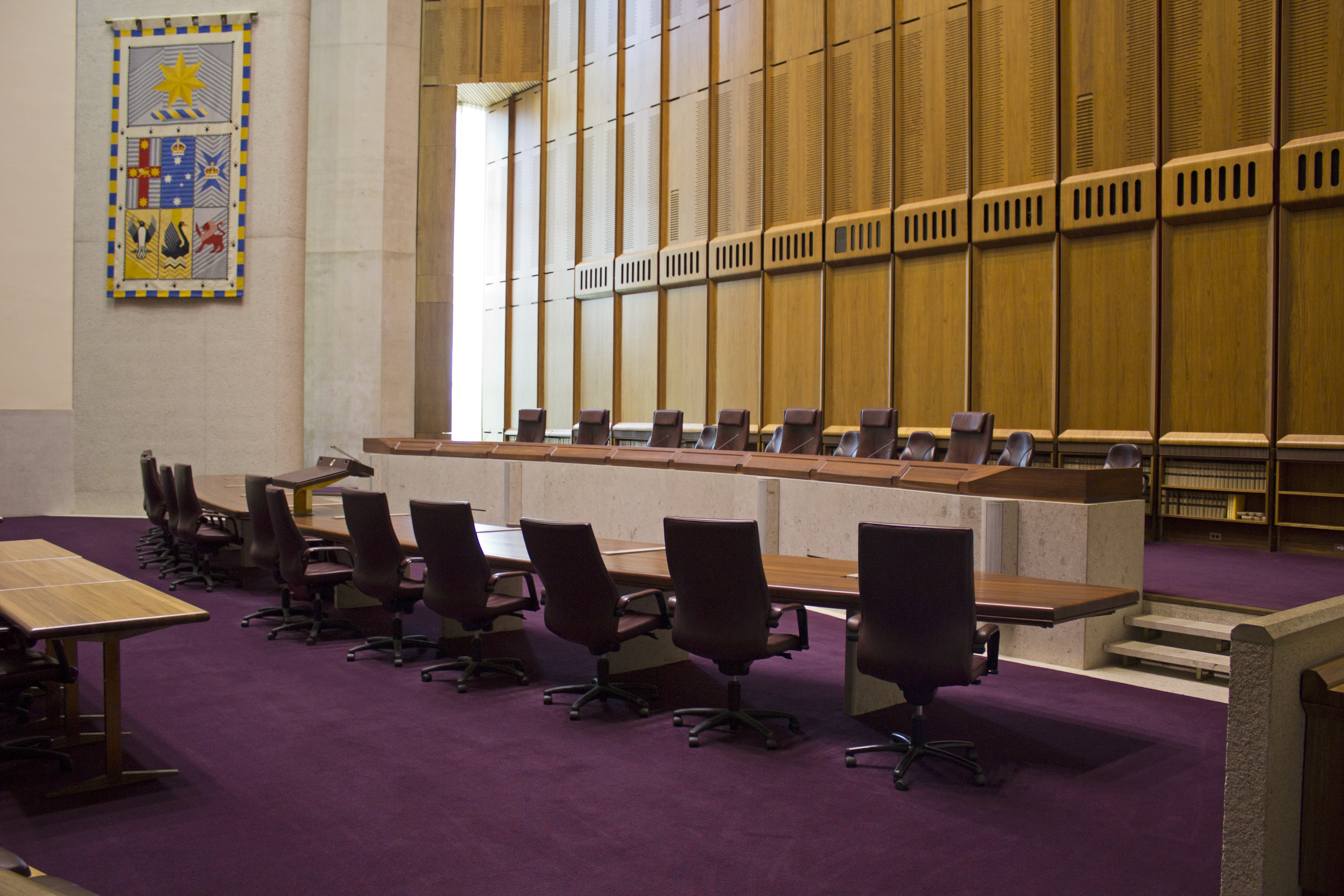
Courtroom 1

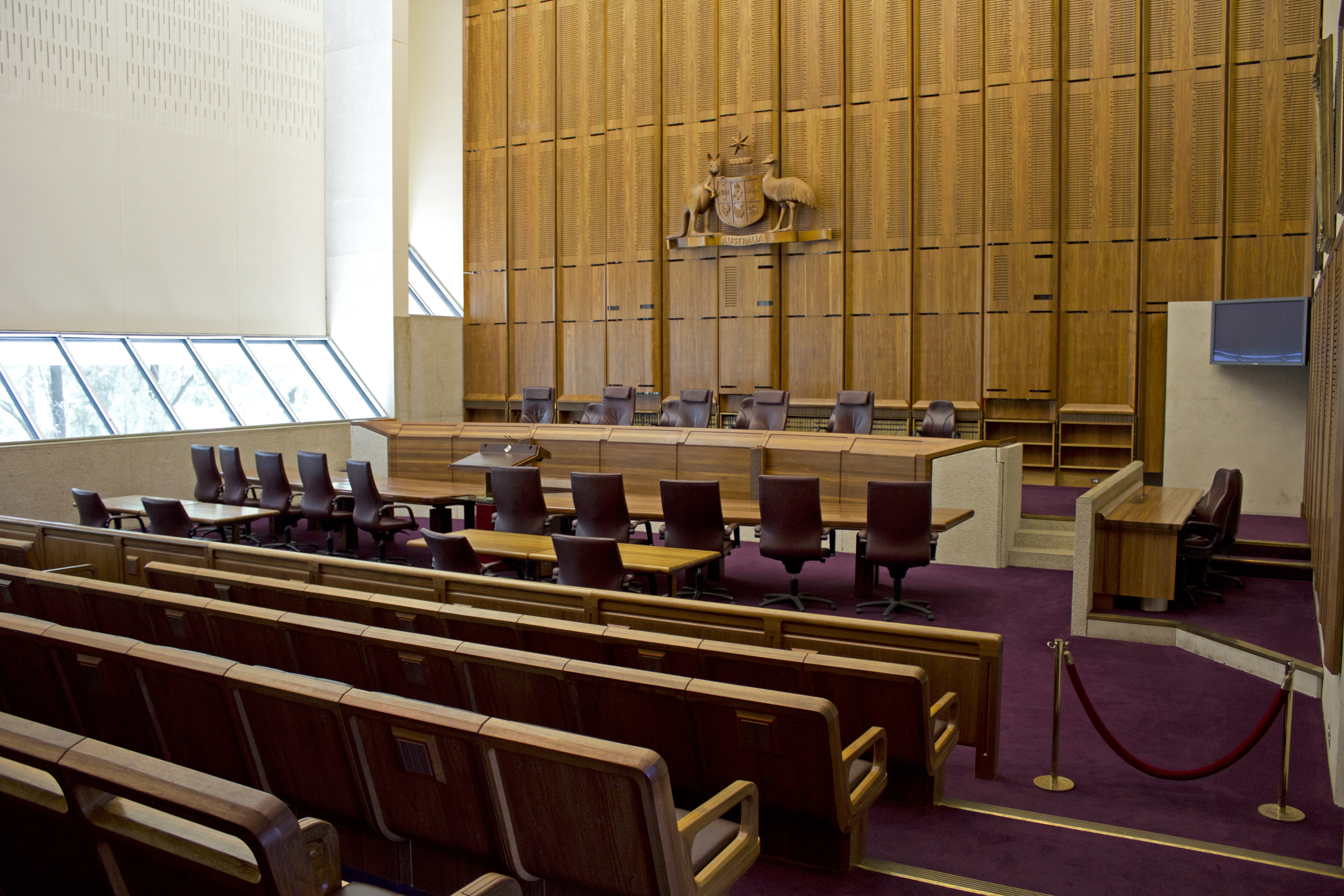
Courtroom 2

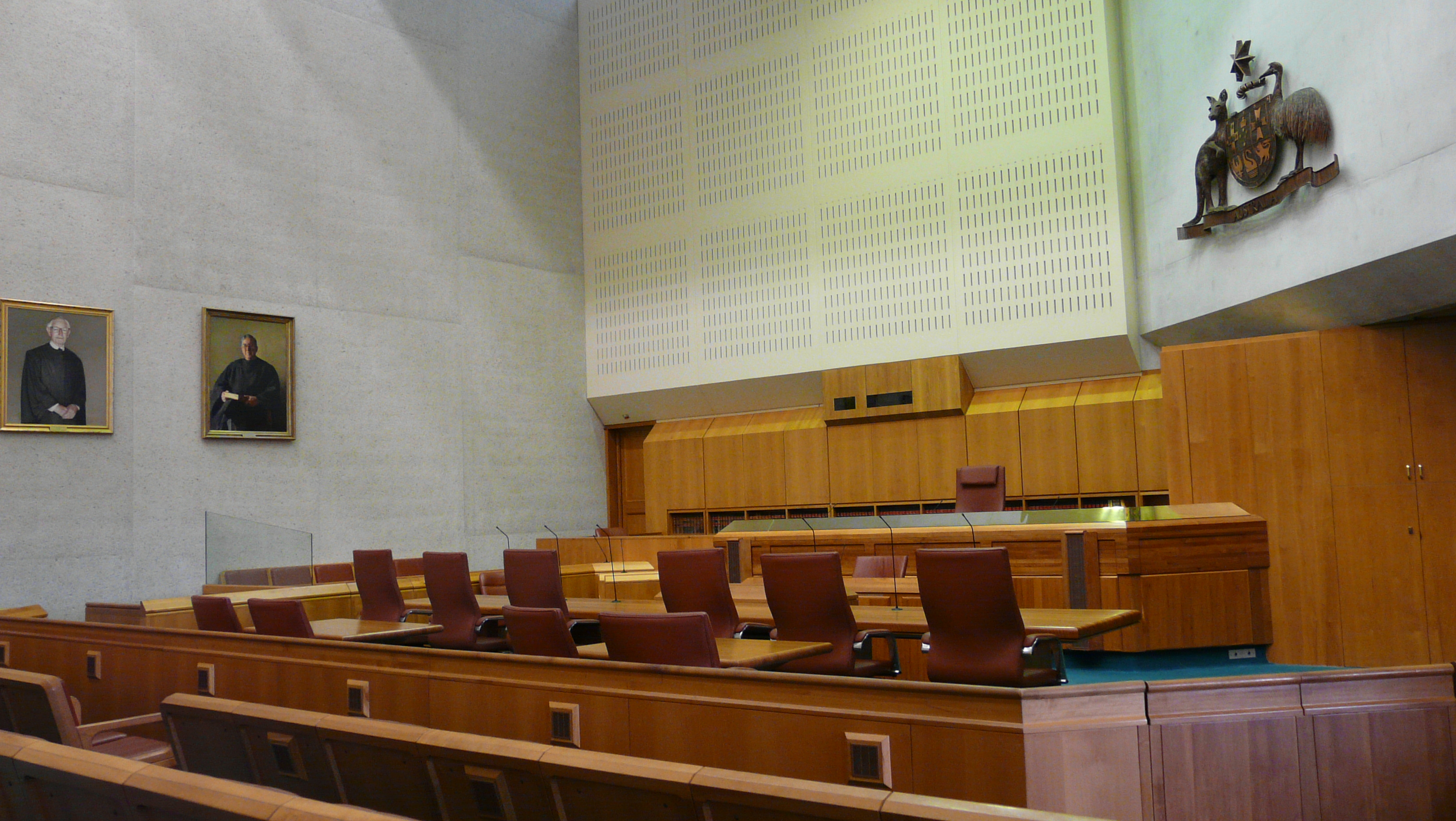
Courtroom 3

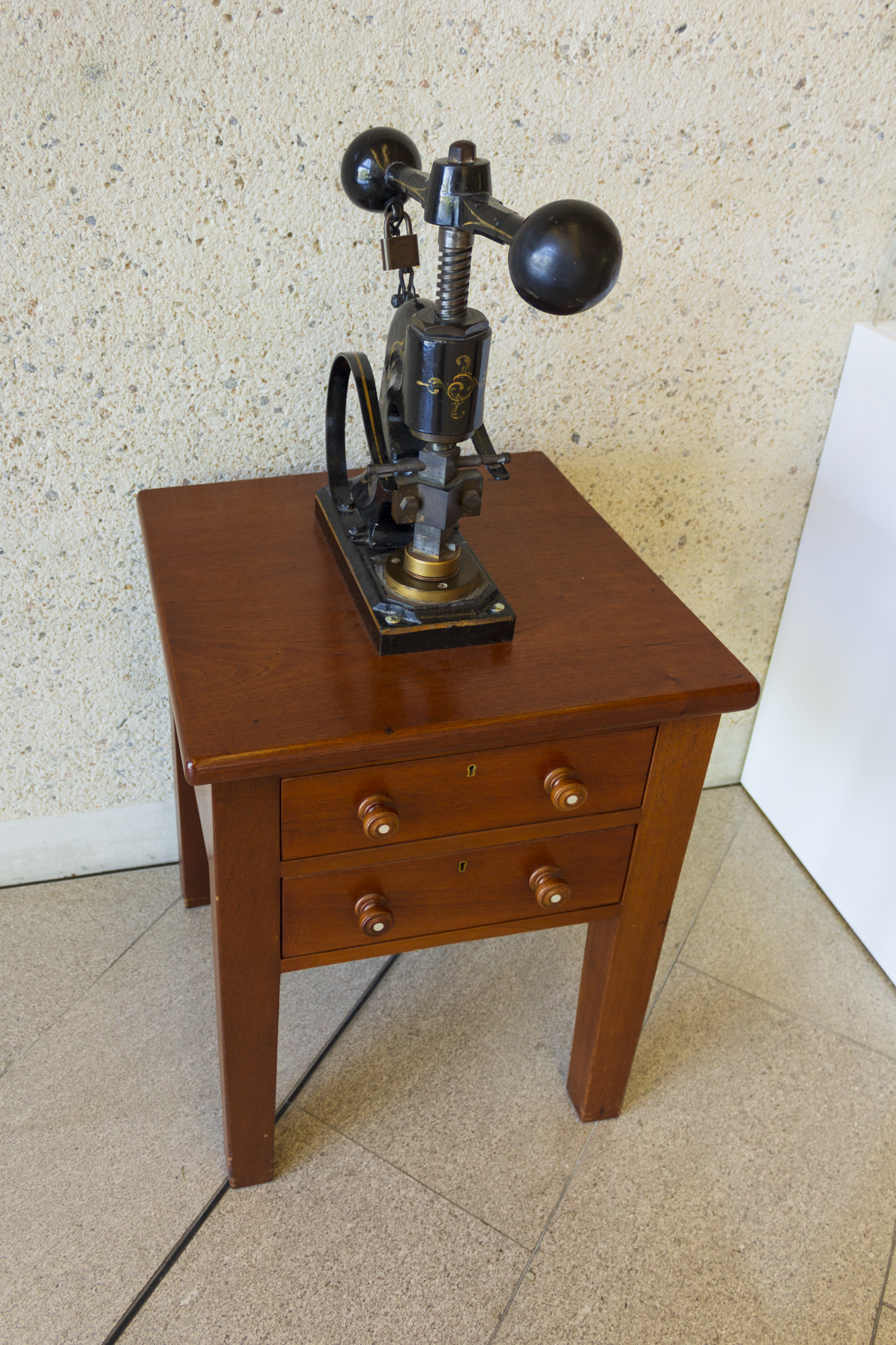
Great Seal of Australia at High Court

== See also ==
- List of Brutalist structures

== Bibliography ==
- Australian Heritage Commission (1987). Register of the National Estate Database Place Report for the Sculpture Gardens, Australian National Gallery (Copy printed 20 October 2000 ed.).
- Australian Heritage Commission (2001). Proceedings of the High Court - National Gallery Heritage Assessments Stakeholder Workshop. Unpublished report.
- Buchanan, B. (2001). The Precinct of the High Court of Australia and National Gallery of Australia. Unpublished report provided to the Australian Heritage Commission.
- Edwards Madigan Torzillo Briggs (EMTB) International and Harry Howard and Associates (July 1980). "High Court of Australia: architects statement". Architecture Australia: 41–52.
- Garnett, R.; Hyndes, D. (1992). The Heritage of the Australian Capital Territory. National Trust of Australia. pp. 111–115.
- High Court of Australia. "The building". High Court of Australia.
- Howard, H.; Buchanan, B. (1999). From Concept to Realisation - A Review of the Landscaping of the High Court of Australia and the National Gallery of Australia. unpublished report.
- Kringas, S (2017). Design of the High Court of Australia (PhD thesis). University of Sydney.
- Royal Australian Institute of Architects (1990). Citation for the Register of Significant Twentieth Century Architecture.
- Taylor J. (1990). Australian Architecture since 1960. The Royal Australian Institute of Architects. pp. 93–102.
