= Northern Beaches Libraries =

Public library service in Sydney, New South Wales, Australia

- Location: Northern Beaches, New South Wales,, Australia
- Type: Public library
- Established: May 12, 2016 (from council merger)
- Branches: 6

Collection
- Items collected: 334,997

Access and use
- Circulation: 1,393,472 (2020-2021)
- Population served: 274,041
- Members: 197,730

Other information
- Employees: 80 (2020-2021)
- Parent organisation: Northern Beaches Council

Northern Beaches Libraries is the public library service of the Northern Beaches in Greater Sydney, New South Wales, Australia.

== History ==
The Northern Beaches Council was made from the merger of the Manly, Pittwater, and Warringah councils of in May 2016, which meant that the council's separate library services were also merged into Northern Beaches Libraries.

In February 2025, Northern Beaches Libraries introduced "light memberships", a limited type of membership that proof-of-address is not needed for.

== Branches ==
Northern Beaches Libraries has six branches - Dee Why, Forrestville, Glen Street, Manly, Mona Vale, and Warringah Mall. The Cubby House Toy Library was opened in 2013 and functions out of the Manly and Mona Vale branches. The local history collections are housed at Dee Why, Manly, and Mona Vale.

=== Dee Why Library ===
Dee Why Library is in the Warringah Civic Centre, and was built in 1966. It was the first Northern Beaches library building to be purpose-built as a library. It was designed by Edwards Madigan and won a Sir John Sulman Medal. In 2004 Dee Why Library was considered for demolition to make space for the new Northern Beaches Hospital, but French's Forest was chosen for the location instead. Dee Why Library has a department specifically for Tibetan books and a bi-weekly Tibetan storytime.

=== Forestville 24/7 library ===
The Forestville branch library is open 24/7. It was one of the first in Australia following Parkes Shire Council (NSW) in 2016, and South Gippsland Shire Council (Victoria) in 2019 and the first in Sydney. The 24/7 library was pioneered by librarian Allison Hamilton, who was nominated for an ALIA Excellence Award as a result of her success in the project, and the support she gave to other libraries interested in implementing their own 24/7 libraries.

The desire for a 24-hour library first started during the COVID-19 pandemic, and the idea was developed over two years. Forestville Library ran a three-month trial for 24/7 opening times starting on Monday 29 August 2022. During the trial, 21% of visits were outside normal library hours and there was an 11% increase in memberships leading the 24/7 hours becoming permanent.

Outside of staffed hours, member enter the library by scanning their library card and entering their PIN associated with the card. Only library members aged sixteen or older can use the library during these hours.

=== Manly library ===
Manly Library was opened in 1901, with a room rented out from the local School of Arts by the Manly Council. It was originally a non-lending library. Mona Vale Library opened on the 3rd of September 1972.

In February 2023, Manly library was the subject of protests and larger counter protests in response to its drag queen storytime. The library received a bomb threat in relation to the event, which was not made public by police until after the event.

In July 2025, Manly Library began a trial (from July to November) funded by the State Library, in which the library would have 24-hour access Sunday-Thursdays. The trial came in response to positive feedback about Forrestville by high school students studying for exams. Library members must complete a safety induction to use the library, and like Forrestville, must be over sixteen years old.

=== Mona Vale Library ===
Mona Vale Library was opened in 1972 as a Warringah Shire Library and was transferred to the Pittwater council in 1992. In 2004, a new Mona Vale library was built, and the old one was turned into council offices.
