= The Retreat, Ryde =

The Retreat
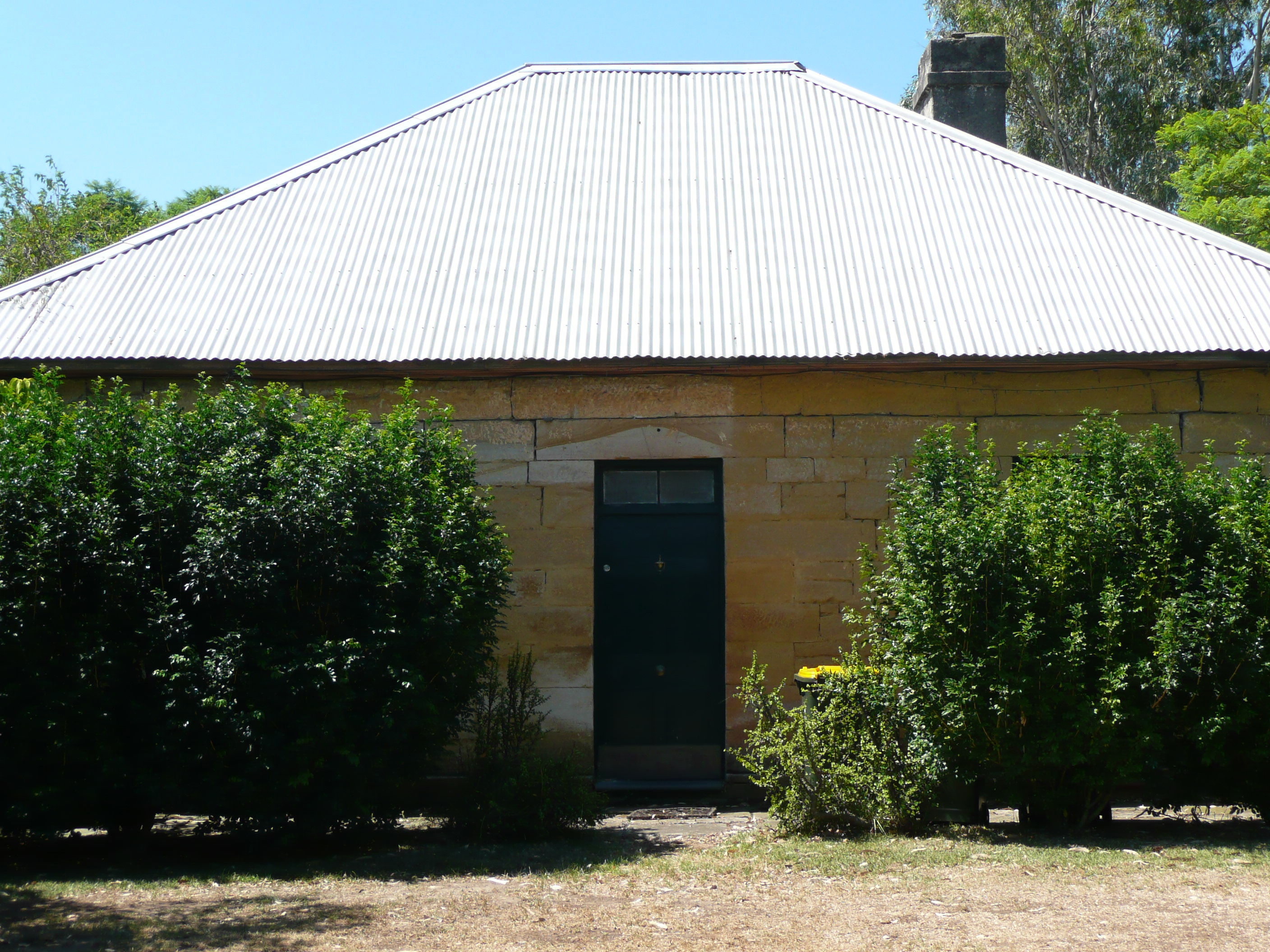
- The Retreat, 2009

- Location within Sydney Location within Australia
- 33°48′51″S 151°05′54″E
- Location: 817 Victoria Road, Ryde, City of Ryde, New South Wales, Australia

History
- Built: 1843

New South Wales Heritage Register
- Official name: Retreat, The; The Retreat
- Type: State heritage (built)
- Designated: 2 April 1999
- Reference no.: 506
- Type: Cottage
- Category: Residential buildings (private)
- Builders: Isaac Shepherd

The Retreat is a heritage-listed cottage at 817 Victoria Road, Ryde in the City of Ryde local government area of New South Wales, Australia. It was built during 1843 by Isaac Shepherd. It was added to the New South Wales State Heritage Register on 2 April 1999.

== History ==
=== Area history ===
The area was highly suitable for farming and orchards, and early grants to marines were given to encourage agriculture. In 1792 land in the area was granted to eight marines; two were in the modern area of Ryde.

Isaac Archer and John Colethread each received 32 hectares (80 acres) of land on the site of the present Ryde-Parramatta Golf Links, now in West Ryde. Later in 1792, in the Eastern Farms area, twelve grants, most of them about 12 hectares (30 acres), were made to convicts. Much later these farms were bought by John Macarthur, Gregory Blaxland and the Reverend Samuel Marsden. The district remained an important orchard area throughout the 19th century.

The 1792 grants were made to ten convicts who had completed their sentences, in the area called the Eastern Boundary or the Eastern Farms, being east of the settlement at Parramatta. By 1794 it was also called Kissing Point. It was not called Ryde until 1841. Situated on the Parramatta River, midway between Sydney and Parramatta, Eastern Farms was the third district to be settled by Europeans.

=== Site history ===
The land on which "The Retreat" was later built was originally a grant of 12 hectares (30 acres) from Lieutenant-Governor Paterson to James Squire in July 1795. Squire found land closer to the river more suitable for his brewery and wharf and in July 1799 sold his grant to his neighbour (and former assigned convict servant), James Shepherd, for A£50. This land was owned by Shepherd's descendants until 1911.

=== Association with the Shepherd family ===
James Shepherd had arrived in New South Wales as a convict aboard the "Matilda" in August 1791. Convicted at Croydon, England In 1785, he had already served six years of his 14-year sentence and soon received a pardon. He married Ann Thorn in February 1795. She had arrived on the "Surprise (2)" in October 1794 with a seven-year sentence. The 60 female convicts aboard the "Surpize" had been specially chosen. All were under 40 years of age so that they would quickly marry and thereby inspire their men to greater diligence and labour on their behalf. In November 1794, a month after her arrival, Ann Thorn was granted 20 acres at the Eastern Farms. Her grant contains the first reference to the district name as "Kissing Point". Four months after her arrival, she married James Shepherd.

Ann and James Shepherd made their home at Thorn Farm, in the vicinity of Thorn Street, Ryde. In addition to Ann's 8.1-hectare (20-acre), James received 12 hectares (30 acres) at the Field of Mars in May 1797. He purchased Squire's 12 hectares (30 acres) on the northern boundary of Ann's grant for A£100, acquired Bradley's adjoining grant and James Stewart's 12 hectares (30 acres) east of Squire's land in 1809. Squire's grant became known as Shepherd's Bush and Bradley's was called Shepherd's Hill. By Governor Macquarie's administration, Shepherd owned all land from Parkes Street to the river between Bowden and Belmore Streets. By 1820 he owned 73 hectares (180 acres) at Kissing Point and by 1828 he had 610 hectares (1,500 acres). In the beginning he had run sheep and grown wheat but soon turned to orange orchards. Much of his land was leased out to tenants.

James and Ann Shepherd had two sons, James (1796-1882) and Isaac (1800–1877), and two daughters, Ann (1797-1882) and Elizabeth. Ann Shepherd died on 7 April 1806, aged 48, and was buried on her farm. Her eldest daughter, nine year old Ann, cared for the other children until her marriage in 1813, aged 16. Much respected in the district, James Shepherd died on 27 April 1847, aged 85, and was buried on Thorn Farm. The gravestones of Ann and James Shepherd were moved to Field of Mars Cemetery when their slab and stone cottage was demolished in 1926.

From the 1820s, much of Shepherd's land at Ryde was managed by, or transferred to, his son, Isaac. Isaac married in 1832 and the following year started to build a cottage, later called Addington, on part of the Stewart grant. In 1835 Isaac acquired land at Meadowbank where in 1840 he built his home, Hellenie, a two-story sandstone mansion. This became his base for pastoral activities in the Murrumbidgee district. Isaac Shepherd was the member of parliament for St Leonards from 1860 to 1864 and was instrumental in efforts to bring local government to Ryde, achieved in 1870, the year of his death.

In 1837 Isaac Shepherd sold a portion on the southern corner of Victoria Road and Bowden Street for a police station. In 1841 he subdivided land around the watch house and near St Anne's, in conjunction with James Devlin. They described their subdivisions as the "Village of Rydell, named after the birthplace of Mrs Turner, the wife of their resident clergyman.

=== Association with William Henry ===
The north-western suburbs of Sydney are often called the "bible-belt". This evangelical tradition started in Ryde in August 1798 when the Reverend William Henry held the first religious service in a barn at Kissing Point. He married James Shepherd's daughter, Ann, as his second wife, and "The Retreat" was their home.

In January 1843 Henry wrote to the London Missionary Society about his plans to retire and settle at Kissing Point. He asked for a grant of A£200 for building. The Society refused, indicating that a retirement allowance would be made for him and if this was insufficient for his "indispensable wants" they would then consider another request. The Society's letter concluded: We rejoice to perceive that in the retreat you have selected for your declining years, you will not be without opportunities for making known the preciousness of a Saviour's love.

On 24 October 1843 James Shepherd "being desirous of making some provision" for his daughter, Ann Henry, gave her one acre of land, part of James Squire's 30 acre grant, bounded on the east by James Stewart's grant and on the south by the public road to Parramatta. Shepherd appointed Joseph Smith, a coffee planter in Tahiti, as Ann's trustee. Smith was her son-in-law, a pious young man who in 1835 had married Elizabeth Henry (born 1816). Smith, his wife and her sister, Ann, settled in Hawaii, where Smith held a government position.

"The Retreat" homestead was probably built in 1843. The deed of gift specified "in consideration of the premises and of ten shillings" and transferred the land and "the message thereon erected". William Henry, though trained as a carpenter, was an elderly man but one of his (stepsons) sons, James Shepherd Henry (born 1820), was a builder. Ann's brother Isaac Shepherd was apparently also its builder. Isaac owned the adjoining one acre portion which was given to him by his father in 1833. Isaac probably provided the stone for "The Retreat" from his quarry. Stone from James Shepherd Sr.'s nearby quarry had been used to build St Anne's Church in 1826, Addington in the 1830s and Hellenie in 1840.

Henry and his family did not settle down at Kissing Point. In late 1844 he returned to Tahiti "with his family of three idle sons and as many daughters." The resident missionary refused to let his daughters visit the Henry home and Isaac and Daniel Henry were charged with defamation following another clash with him. These personal conflicts were further confused by the political situation and William and Ann Henry's friendship with the French who had declared Tahiti a French protectorate in 1842. The directors of the London Missionary Society, as well as the resident missionaries, were anxious to remove the Henry family from the islands but recognised that they were only "punishing a parent for the errors of his child. Mr Henry...has pained his mind. He declines removing, in consequence of his health."

In 1847 Henry, aged 77, celebrated his jubilee as a missionary. In April 1847 James Shepherd died at Kissing Point, leaving property for his daughter, Ann, and her children. William and Ann Henry, with four of their ten children, returned to Sydney in February 1848 and settled at their "Retreat". Here, at last, the family achieved a quiet respectability denied them in their pioneering years in the Pacific. Financial difficulties did not disappear. Ann and her two youngest daughters, Sophia and Henrietta, had inherited from James Shepherd a block of land in George Street, Sydney. Regular mortgages on this land, the first for A£700 in June 1857, provided capital until Sophia died unmarried in 1904. "The Retreat" was mortgaged in December 1858 for A£200 and repaid in full two years later.

William Henry continued to preach at St.Anne's and acted as school master until his death at Ryde aged 89 in April 1859, his body erect, his voice strong and his conversation animated to the last. His obituary in The Sydney Morning Herald declared him "a pioneer of civilisation and commerce as a teacher of the Christian faith, he maintained an unblemished reputation through all the trials of his long public life. The children of the southern islands ... will pay their homage to the memory of one who devoted his life to their welfare."

He was buried in St Anne's cemetery, not far from where he had preached the first service in the district 61 years earlier.

Ann Henry continued to live at "The Retreat" for some years after her husband's death. An unmarried daughter, Sophia, and a son, Philip, lived with her. Nearby another son, James Shepherd Henry, lived at "The Glen". J.S.Henry was a builder and government building inspector. In 1870 he and Friers were awarded the contract to build the new Wesleyan Church at Ryde and three years later with William Trevitt, J.S.Henry built St Anne's Parochial School on the corner of Belmore Street and Victoria Road. At Ryde, Ann Henry was particularly active in the Wesleyan Church which had been built the year she returned to the district. She was regarded as the founder of the Ryde Wesleyan Sunday School. In May 1873 she gave a three-foot strip of land between "The Retreat" and "Addington" to her nephew, Thomas Kendall Bowden, who owned "Addington". He was erecting a new room and had built partly on her land.

About 1880 Ann Henry moved to Glebe where some of her children and grandchildren lived. Despite her advanced years, she became a member of the Glebe Congregational Church and was visited by a younger generation of missionaries. She resided with her son, Philip, living in Arundel Terrace and later in Pyrmont Bridge Road where she died, aged 84 on 29 July 1882. Ann Henry was buried with her husband in St Anne's cemetery, Ryde.

In her will dated 1870, Ann Henry left The Retreat" to her youngest son, Philip Hitoti Henry (1829-1909); however in a codicil in 1877, she left it to another son, Daniel Tyreman Bennett Henry (1825-1891), but permitted Philip use of the house for five years after her death. Although Philip Henry does not appear, from Sands Directories, to have lived at "The Retreat" in the 1880s, he may have leased it out.

Daniel T. B. Henry had settled in Sydney with his parents in 1848. He married Sarah Rebecca Pemell at Balmain in 1860 and by the 1870s, his wild Tahitian childhood put aside, was a successful businessman in partnership with J.C.Yeo in the City Flour Mills. His home was "Stanmore House" on Enmore Road and Simmons Street. By 1882, the year of his mother's death, he was a justice of the peace. He died nine years later, leaving property valued at A£1,600 and no will. "The Retreat" was inherited by his widow, Sarah, and his seven children.

In 1882 when Ann Henry died, "The Retreat" was one of less than 100 houses in the village of Ryde. Within the next few years, the area grew quickly and many new houses were built. "The Retreat" was probably vacant for several years in the late 1880s and 1890s. In 1897 it was leased to S. B. Vanderpump. H. G. Hill rented it from 1898 until about 1904. Henry W.Bennett leased it for about four years, followed by Frederick Nicholls and then Hugh McManamey.

=== Later owners ===
In July 1911 Sarah Henry and her children sold The Retreat" to retired mariner, James Brand Simmons of Gladesville for A£480. In 1912 Simmons also purchased the adjoining western block on the corner of Shepherd Street. Both blocks were put up for sale by the Public Trustee in 1925 and purchased by Joseph Murray, a Ryde builder. He immediately sold the rear portion facing Anderson Avenue and the corner block to another builder but retained "The Retreat" for two years, selling in 1927 to George S. Dunnett, an engineer of Huntley's Point. Dunnett divided the block, selling "The Retreat" in 1929 to Alma Moffat and the block between "The Retreat" and "Addington I1 to James Jones, a builder of Willoughby in 1930.

Mrs Alma Moffatt retained "The Retreat" until 1949 when she sold to Ronald Littlejohn. Samuel Samson of Rydalmere purchased "The Retreat" in 1962.

A Commission of Inquiry was held into the making of Permanent Conservation Order over the Retreat, in 1987. A Permanent Conservation Order was gazetted for The Retreat in 1987. The Retreat was transferred to the State Heritage Register on 2 April 1999.

== Description ==
Site

The Retreat is sited on a large residential block, the building itself being set back considerably from Victoria Road. The front garden contains remnants of previous landscaping, including rose bushes, a central pathway leading to the house and two mature pencil pine/Mediterranean cypresses (Cupressus sempervirens) either side of the main entry. The large rear yard contains several mature fruit trees.

Cottage

The Retreat is a four roomed sandstone cottage, with a later addition of two attic rooms each with a dormer window facing the rear of the cottage. A kitchen and bathroom wing has been added to the rear of the cottage.

The external walls of the cottage are of solid dressed sandstone now rendered both sides. The hipped corrugated iron roof is of timber collar tie construction with batten spaces indicating that it may have been previously shingled. The roof eaves have a timber boarded soffit.

Several walls and ceilings in the rear rooms are of lath and plaster while other ceilings are of pressed metal.

The timber floors, window joinery and fireplaces appear to be in sound condition.

=== Modifications and dates ===
An original front verandah has been removed.

== Heritage listing ==
As at 22 November 2007, The Retreat is an item of State significance as a rare example, in the Ryde district, of a simple early to mid 19th century sandstone cottage built by Isaac Shepherd, the owner of Addington and a member of the NSW Parliament, for his sister, Ann and brother-in-law, William Henry. Henry an early pioneer in the Ryde area and a close friend of Samuel Marsden, was a member of the first group of white missionaries to visit Tahiti. The Retreat is important as a heritage item because it is one of the oldest buildings in the area and has early associations with Addington.

The Retreat was listed on the New South Wales State Heritage Register on 2 April 1999 having satisfied the following criteria.

The place is important in demonstrating the course, or pattern, of cultural or natural history in New South Wales.

The land on which The Retreat was built was owned by James Shepherd and his descendants, the Henry family, from 1799 to 1911. The Retreat was built about 1843 to provide a home for Ann Henry, née Shepherd, when she and her husband, the Reverend William Henry, retired as missionaries in Tahiti. The Shepherd family were significant pioneers of the agricultural, commercial, religious and civic life of Ryde in the nineteenth century. The neighbouring homes of Isaac Shepherd at Addington and his sister Ann at the Retreat are rare survivors of contiguous family houses.

The place has a strong or special association with a person, or group of persons, of importance of cultural or natural history of New South Wales's history.

The Retreat is associated through the Reverend William Henry with the first church service in the Ryde district in 1798 and early efforts to build a local church and school. The Retreat is associated through the Reverend William Henry with the first Christian missionaries to visit the Pacific and establish a European settlement there. Henry was among the first group and remained through personal and political adversity as the longest serving member of these pioneer missionaries. His children and their descendants, scattered through Tahiti, Hawaii and New Zealand, pioneered European settlement in the South Pacific.

The place is important in demonstrating aesthetic characteristics and/or a high degree of creative or technical achievement in New South Wales.

The Retreat is significant as a modest house to which its construction relied upon family members and a retirement pension of a retiring missionary. The scale of the Retreat, a small cottage, set back from a thoroughfare which even in the 1840s was a main route to Parramatta, evokes the modesty and retirement of its missionary worker and his slight financial resources in comparison with his wealthier in-laws, the Shepherds at the adjoining Addington.

The place possesses uncommon, rare or endangered aspects of the cultural or natural history of New South Wales.

Though Ryde is the third district of European settlement in Australia, only a small number of its buildings before 1850 survive. The Retreat is a rare example of a simple cottage that were once common in the district.

== See also ==
- Australian residential architectural styles
