= Tennyson Point =

- Suburb
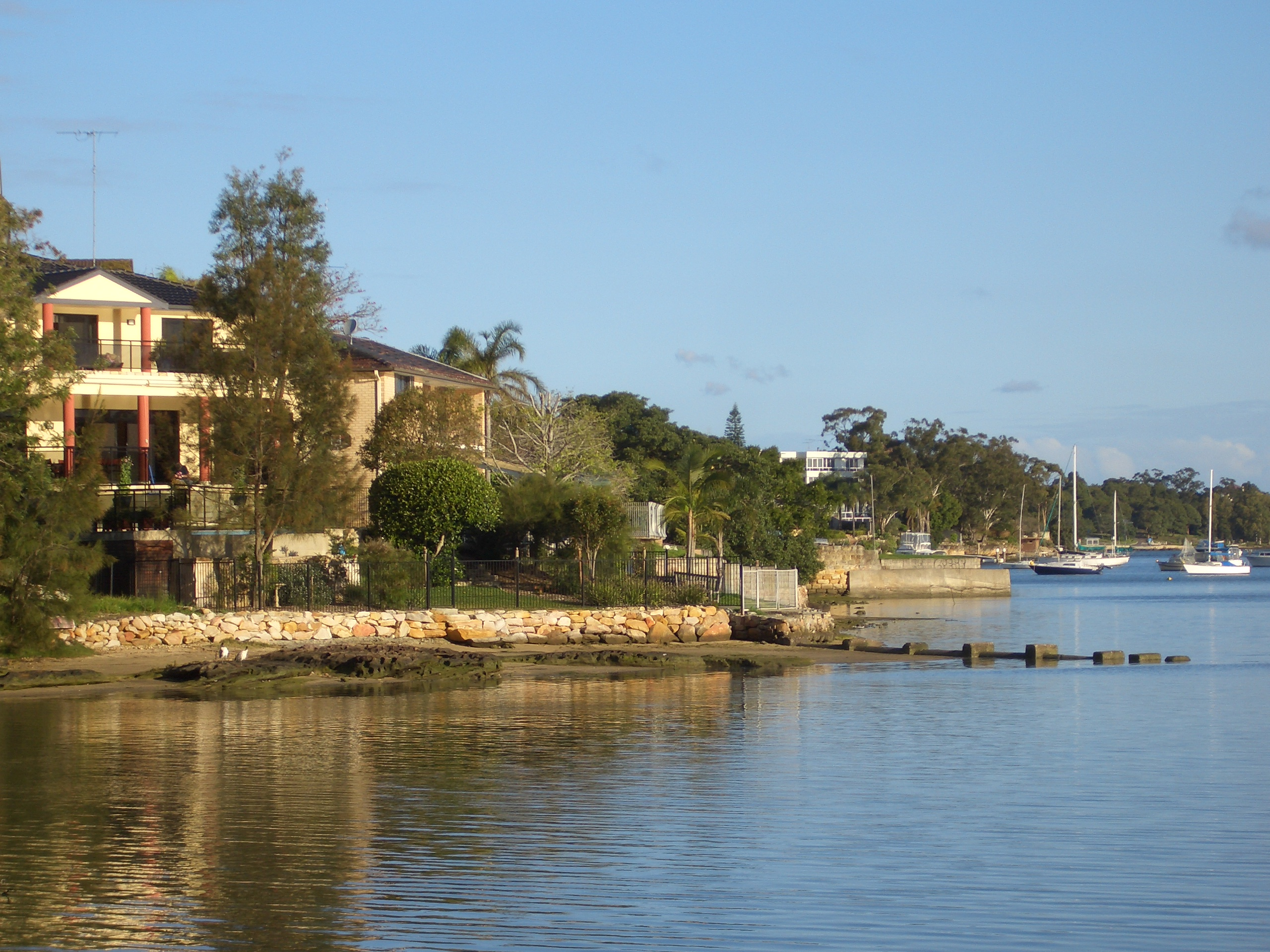
- Tennyson Point, view from Morrisons Bay

- Interactive map of Tennyson Point
- Country: Australia
- State: New South Wales
- City: Sydney
- LGA: City of Ryde
- Location: 13 km (8.1 mi) W of Sydney CBD

Government
  - State electorate: Lane Cove
  - Federal division: Bennelong
- Elevation: 23 m (75 ft)

Population
  - Total: 1,247 (2021 census)
- Postcode: 2111
Suburbs around Tennyson Point
Ryde	Ryde	Gladesville
Putney	Tennyson Point	Gladesville
Breakfast Point	Cabarita	Abbotsford

Tennyson Point is a suburb of Sydney, New South Wales, Australia. Tennyson Point is located 10 kilometres west of the Sydney central business district, in the local government area of the City of Ryde and is part of the Northern Sydney region.

Tennyson Point sits on the northern bank of the Parramatta River on a peninsula positioned between Morrisons Bay and Glades Bay. The suburb was originally called Tennyson before it was renamed Tennyson Point by the Geographical Names Board of New South Wales in 2001.

== History ==
Tennyson Point takes its name from the Tennyson Estate, named after the poet Alfred Tennyson, which was subdivided in 1887.

Captain William Raven, (1756-1814) who sailed to New South Wales in 1792 as captain and part owner of the Britannia, was granted 100 acres (40 ha) of land in the area in 1795, plus another 285 acres (115 ha) in 1799. The grant to Raven was known as Grove Farm. These Eastern Farm properties were managed for him by the brewer James Squire of Kissing Point until 1822. The tip of the peninsula into the Parramatta River at Tennyson Point is now called Raven Point. The creek running into Morrisons Bay near the western boundary of Tennyson Point is now called Grove Creek.

In the 1820s all the land of the current suburb was owned by James Squire's daughter Mary Ann Farnell and her husband Thomas Charles Farnell (brewer). Mary Ann and Thomas were the parents of James Squire Farnell who became the first Australian born premier of New South Wales.

== Population ==
In the 2021 Census, there were 1,247 people in Tennyson Point. 68.6% of people were born in Australia and 71.7% of people spoke only English at home. The most common responses for religion were Catholic 42.1%, No Religion 25.5% and Anglican 8.9%.
