= Ryde police station =

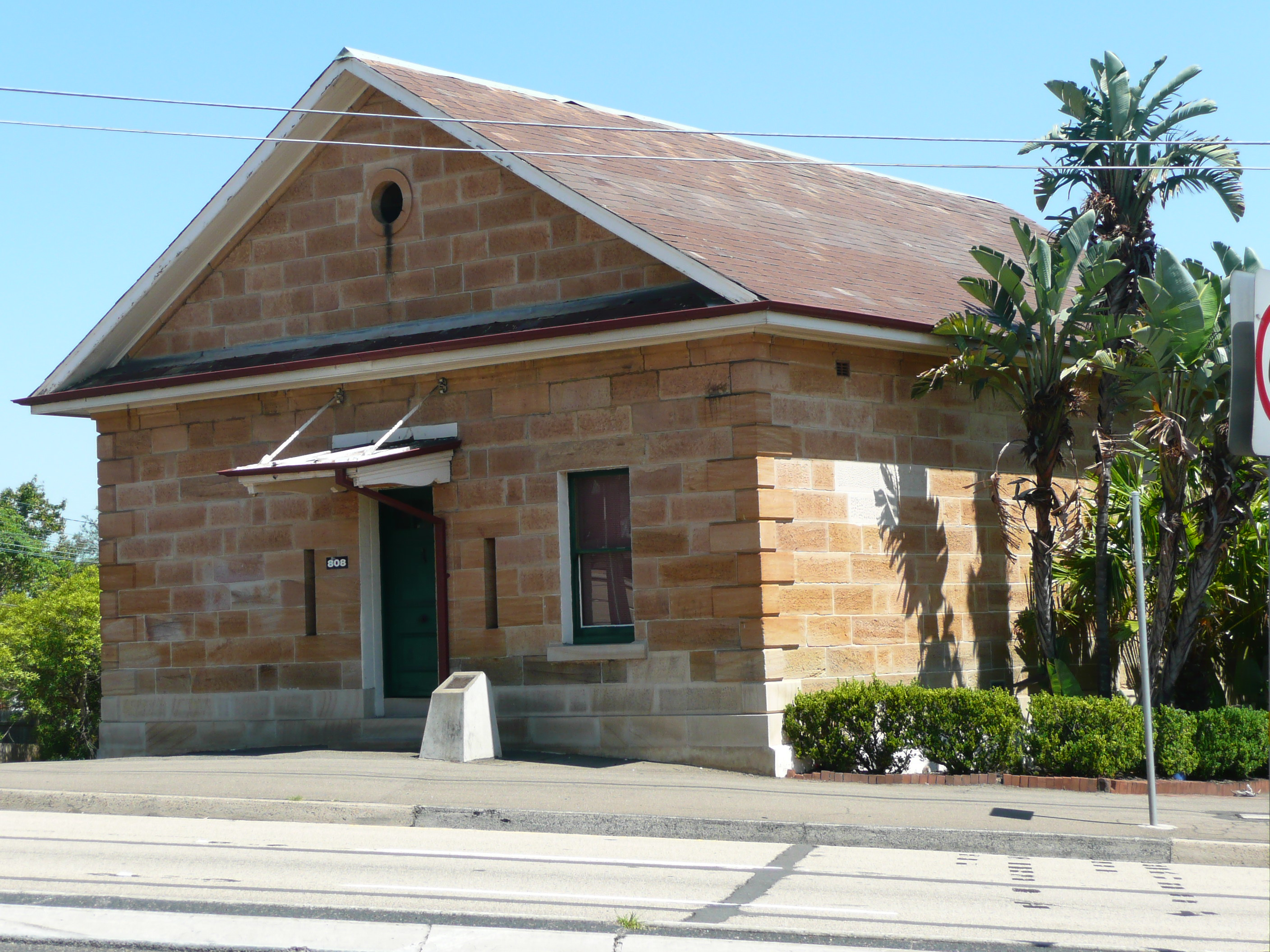
- Ryde police station, pictured in 2009.

- Location within Sydney Location within Australia
- 33°48′56″S 151°06′00″E
- Location: 808-810 Victoria Road, Ryde, City of Ryde, New South Wales, Australia

History
- Built: 1836–1837

Site notes
- Architect: Mortimer Lewis
- Owner: NSW Police

New South Wales Heritage Register
- Official name: Police Station (former); Police Station; Detective's Offices; Kissing Point Police Watch House or lockup
- Type: State heritage (built)
- Designated: 2 April 1999
- Reference no.: 1017
- Type: Police station
- Category: Law Enforcement
- Builders: David Taylor; Messrs Brodie & Craig

The Ryde police station is a heritage-listed lockup, police residence and police station located at 808-810 Victoria Road, Ryde in the City of Ryde local government area of New South Wales, Australia. It was designed by Mortimer Lewis and built from 1836 to 1837 by David Taylor; Messrs Brodie & Craig. It is also known as Ryde Police Station (former), Ryde Police Station, Ryde Detective's Offices and Kissing Point Police Watch House or lockup. The property is owned by NSW Police, an agency of the Government of New South Wales. It was added to the New South Wales State Heritage Register on 2 April 1999.

== History ==
The Ryde area was highly suitable for farming and orchards, and early grants to marines were given to encourage agriculture. In 1792 land in the area was granted to eight marines; two of the grants were in the modern area of Ryde. Isaac Archer and John Colethread each received 32 hectares (80 acres) of land on the site of the present Ryde-Parramatta Golf Links, now in West Ryde. Later in 1792, in the Eastern Farms area, twelve grants, most of them about 12 hectares (30 acres), were made to convicts. Much later these farms were bought by John Macarthur, Gregory Blaxland and the Reverend Samuel Marsden. The district remained an important orchard area throughout the 19th century.

The Kissing Point Police Watch House or lockup was built in 1837 and is reputedly the oldest continuous police building in use in Australia.

Mortimer Lewis, Colonial Architect (1835-1849) was a prolific designer, responsible for the first buildings in the Tarban Creek Lunatic Asylum (later Gladesville Hospital). Ex-convict John Small was the first constable. In 1836 the Watch House had one male and one female cell, plus two toilets and a Constable's room. A hall led from the front to the back of the building, and the Pyrmont sandstone walls were 305–380 millimetres (12.0–15.0 in) thick. The purupse of the small alcoves adjacent to the front door is unknown. At the rear are brick cell blocks and a police residence, dating from 1898-1899.

An adjoining courthouse was built in c. 1924.

== Description ==
A simple, single storey rectangular building with a gable roof. The gable end contains an oriel window and the front entrance is covered by a canopy.

Built in Pyrmont sandstone with a slate roof.

In 1836 the Watch House had one male and one female cell, plus two toilets and a Constable's room. A hall led from the front to the back of the building, and the Pyrmont sandstone walls were 305–380 millimetres (12.0–15.0 in) thick. The purpose of the small alcoves adjacent to the front door is unknown.

At the rear are brick cell blocks and a police residence, dating from 1898-1899.

An adjoining courthouse was built in c. 1924.

=== Condition ===
As at 8 February 2001, no assessment, but medium archaeological potential.

=== Modifications and dates ===
1840; 1864; 1899; 1920s; 1979/80 and 1996.

- 1864 - building extended
- 1899 - building extended

== Heritage listing ==
As at 15 August 2008, constructed in 1837, the former Police Station building is of great historical and architectural importance being reputedly the oldest Police building in continual service in New South Wales.

Police Station was listed on the New South Wales State Heritage Register on 2 April 1999.

== See also ==
- List of police stations in New South Wales
