= Putney, New South Wales =

Putney
- Suburb
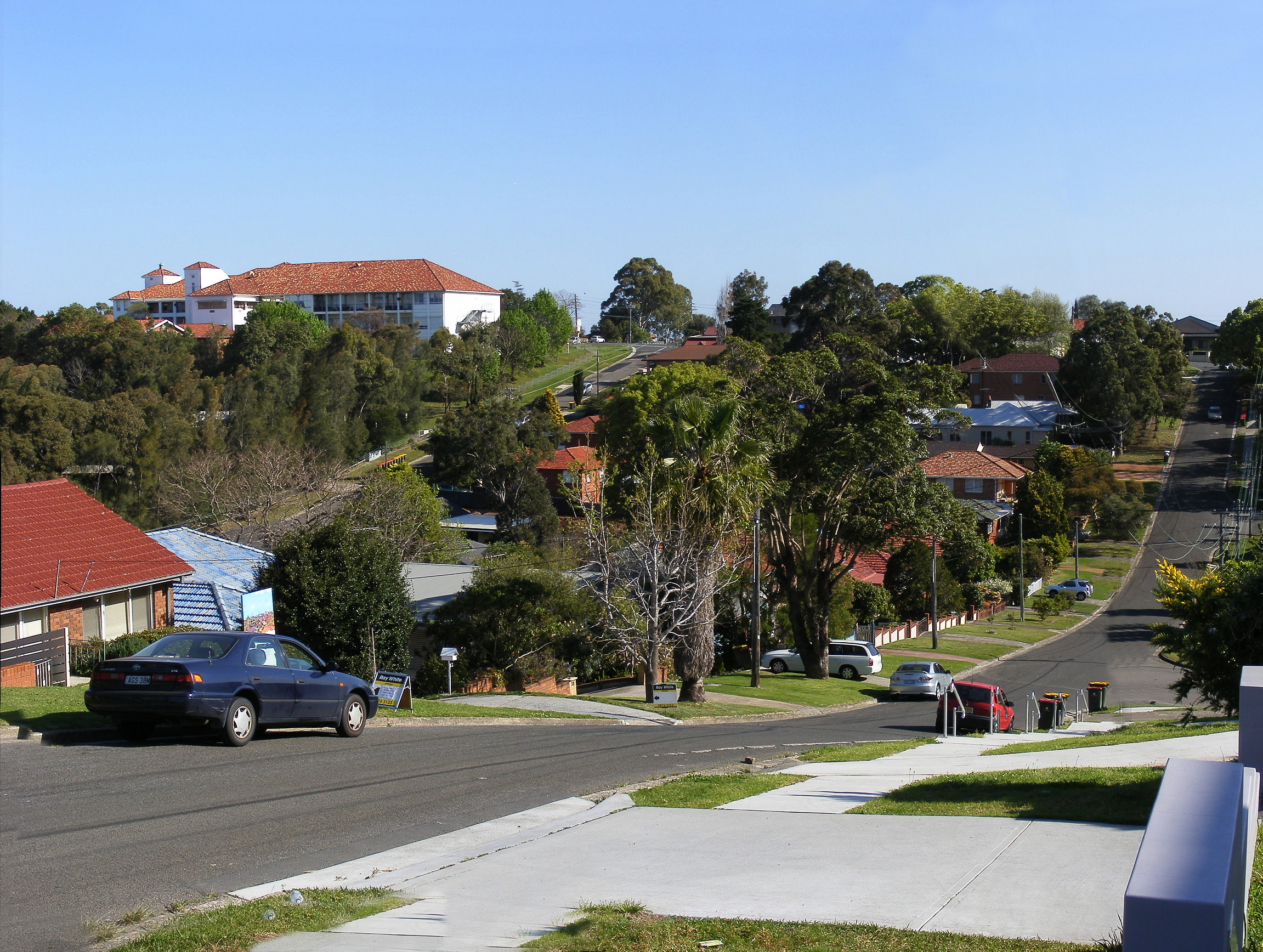
- Typical Putney streetscape

- Interactive map of Putney
- Country: Australia
- State: New South Wales
- City: Sydney
- LGA: City of Ryde
- Location: 11 km (6.8 mi) WNW of Sydney CBD

Government
  - State electorate: Lane Cove
  - Federal division: Bennelong
- Elevation: 29 m (95 ft)

Population
  - Total: 4,097 (2021 census)
- Postcode: 2112
Suburbs around Putney
West Ryde	Ryde	Gladesville
Meadowbank	Putney	Tennyson Point
Rhodes	Mortlake	Breakfast Point

Putney is a suburb of Northern Sydney, New South Wales, Australia. It is located 11 kilometres (7 mi) north-west of the Sydney central business district on the northern bank of the Parramatta River. Its local government area is the City of Ryde.

== History ==
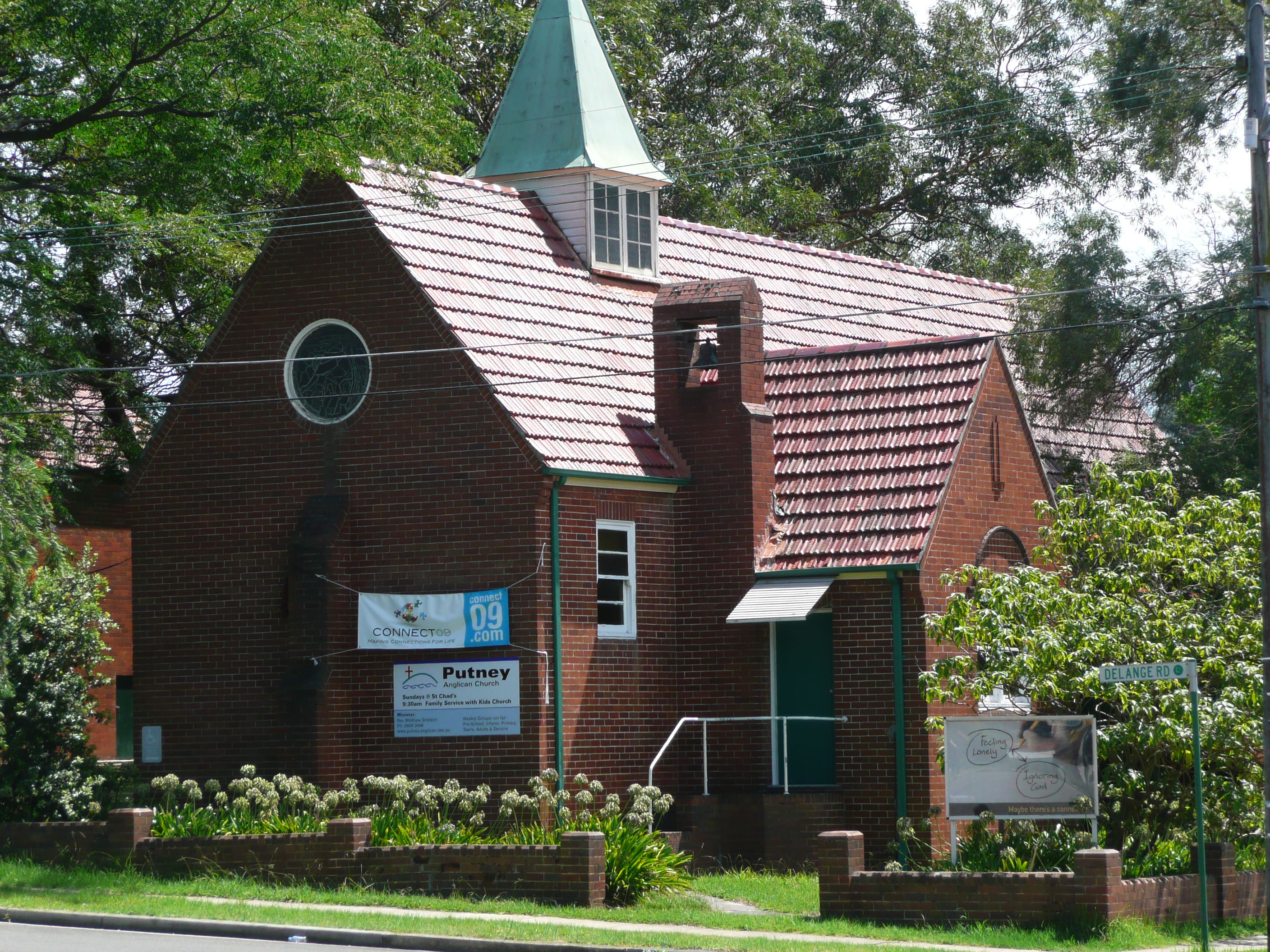
St Chad's Anglican Church, Delange Road

Evidence of the Walumedegal clan remains around Morrisons Bay and Glades Bay, with 4 distinct sites including shelters amongst the sandstone overhangs, open rock engraving site, sheltered stencil (art site) and an axe grinding site.

The area of Putney and Ryde was originally known Eastern Farms and then as Kissing Point by the British colonists. It was one of the first areas of British settlement in the colony. One of the earliest settlers within the present day suburb was the brewer James Squire who settled there in 1792. He established his brewery the Malt Shovel near the present day Kissing Point.

The eastern section of Putney was part of a land grant to Nicholas Bayly in 1799. The land was later sold to Eugene Delange who subdivided the land calling it the Village of Eugenie.

The name was later changed to Putney, derived from its namesake Putney on the River Thames in London. Parramatta River had been known as the 'Thames of the Antipodes' and other nearby suburbs were also named after Thames localities of Greenwich, Woolwich and Henley. Putney was also the midpoint for watching World Championship rowing races from the 1880s to 1930s. The first regatta was held in 1847 at Kissing Point. The following decade, Sydneysiders were mad about rowing, and lucrative prizes were given to local and national championships. By the 1880s, the river was a focus for thousands watching the world championship sculling races. The course ran between Kissing Point and Uhr's Point (south east side of Ryde Bridge). The local addiction to sculling fever was called "water on the brain". World Championships were contested on the course, results eagerly awaited in both Britain and America. Men and women alike discussed water conditions, racing times, and technicalities of boats. Most of the champions trained at Ryde. Local, national, and international races were held on the Parramatta River. Inter-varsity and GPS schools also had their annual regattas on the river between 1893–1935. Banjo Paterson recalled; "from twenty-five to thirty men could be seen on any fine morning swinging along in their sculls at practice – and such men! From riverside farms, and from axe men's camps in the North Coast timber country, from shipyards and fishing fleets, they flocked to the old river as the gladiators flocked to Rome in the last days of the Empire."

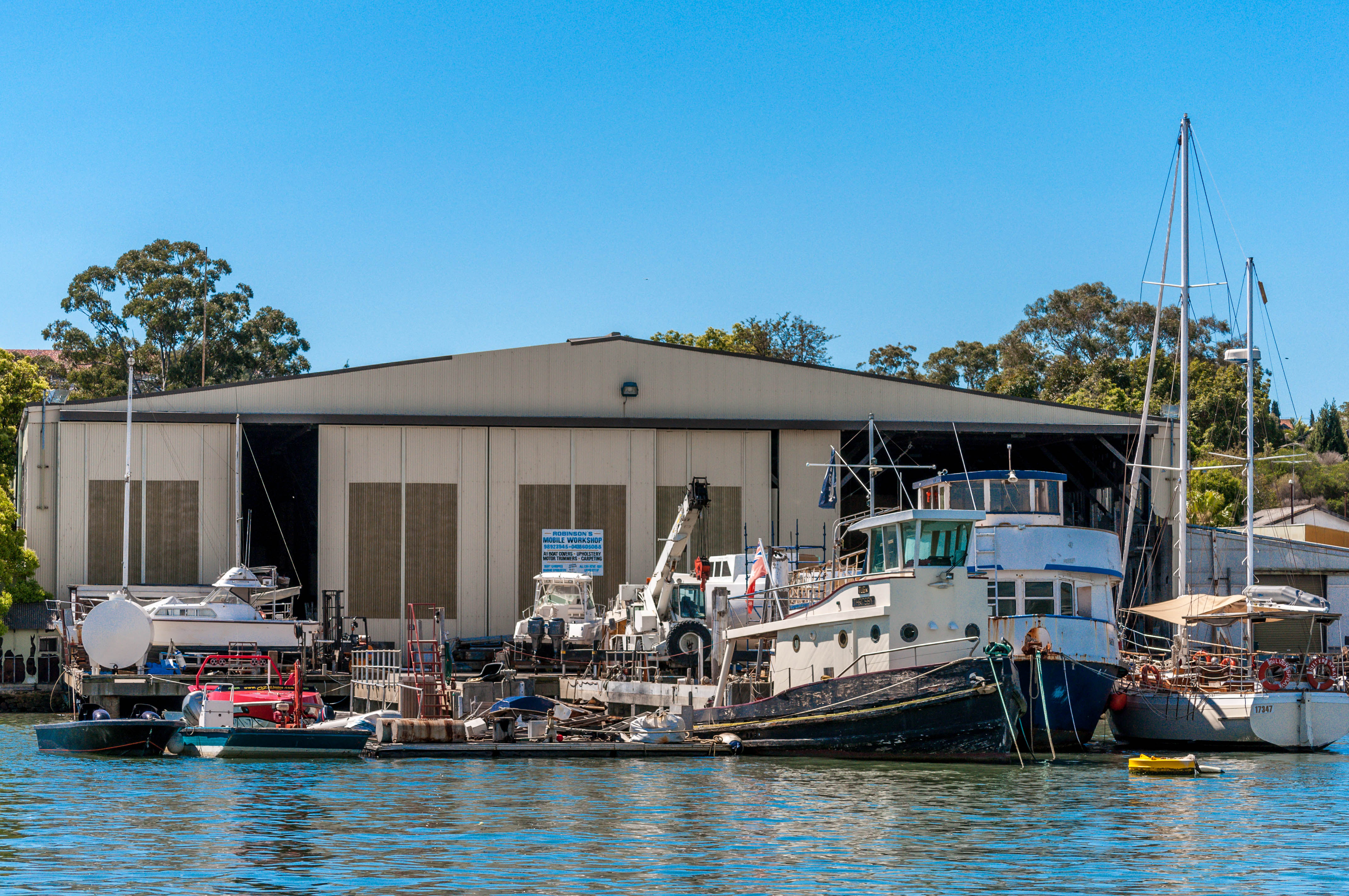
Boat Yard, Parramatta River, Putney, New South Wales

A punt service was established before 1896, crossing the river between Putney Point and Mortlake Point. This service was driven by hand. A cable ferry was opened in 1928, and was officially called the Mortlake Ferry. It is the last surviving punt in the Sydney metropolitan area.

In 1943, during World War II, Slazengers (Australia) Pty Ltd established a ship building yard on Pellisier Road, Putney. The company manufactured wartime equipment for the United States Army and the Australian Government. During the war, the Putney shipyard built scows and landing craft; however Slazengers also built military huts, houses for munition workers, military canteens, hospitals, small arms, ammunition boxes and gas masks. Ship contracts included trawlers, tugboats, landing craft, life boats, scows and high speed work boats.

Morrisons Bay is named after Archibald Morrison, a soldier who received a land grant in 1795 of 55 acres. One of the colony's wealthiest settlers, Captain William Raven, owned 100 acres that ran between Glades Bay to Morrisons Bay. The land was subdivided in 1887. Named after Lord Alfred Tennyson, the Tennyson Estate was promoted as having front seat views to the Championship rowing course. Two world Champion rowers, Beach (1884) and Kemp (1887) have streets named after them. The Eastern side of Morrison's Bay was a textile mill, the Head of bay is a reclaimed mangrove flat and River baths were established 1918.

== Transport ==
Putney is served by Busways route 507, which travels between Gladesville and Meadowbank wharf. The Kissing Point ferry wharf, located in the suburb, provides access to the Parramatta River ferry services, with a 40-minute ferry service to Circular Quay.

Meadowbank railway station is located beyond the suburb's northwestern boundary.

== Landmarks ==
Putney's facilities include a primary school, post office, sporting fields, parks, a shopping area and a few restaurants. Putney is also home to St Chad's Anglican Church, Delange Road, which was founded in 1912 and whose building is of historical significance. It is named after St Chad of Mercia, who lived in the 7th century and was abbot of several monasteries, as well as a bishop.

Cleves Park is the possible burial site of Bennelong and contains a memorial plaque.

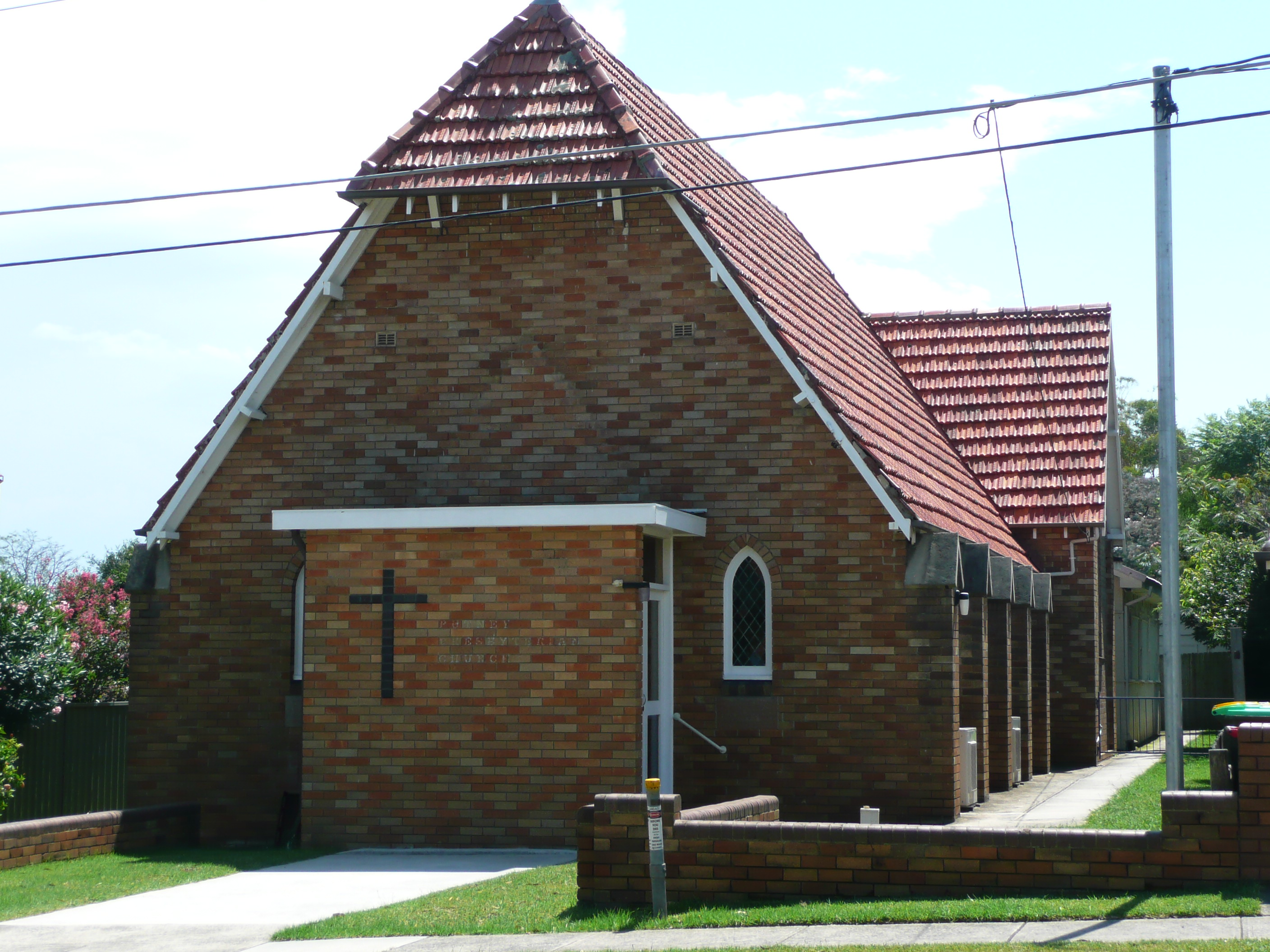
Evangelical Bible Church, Douglas Street

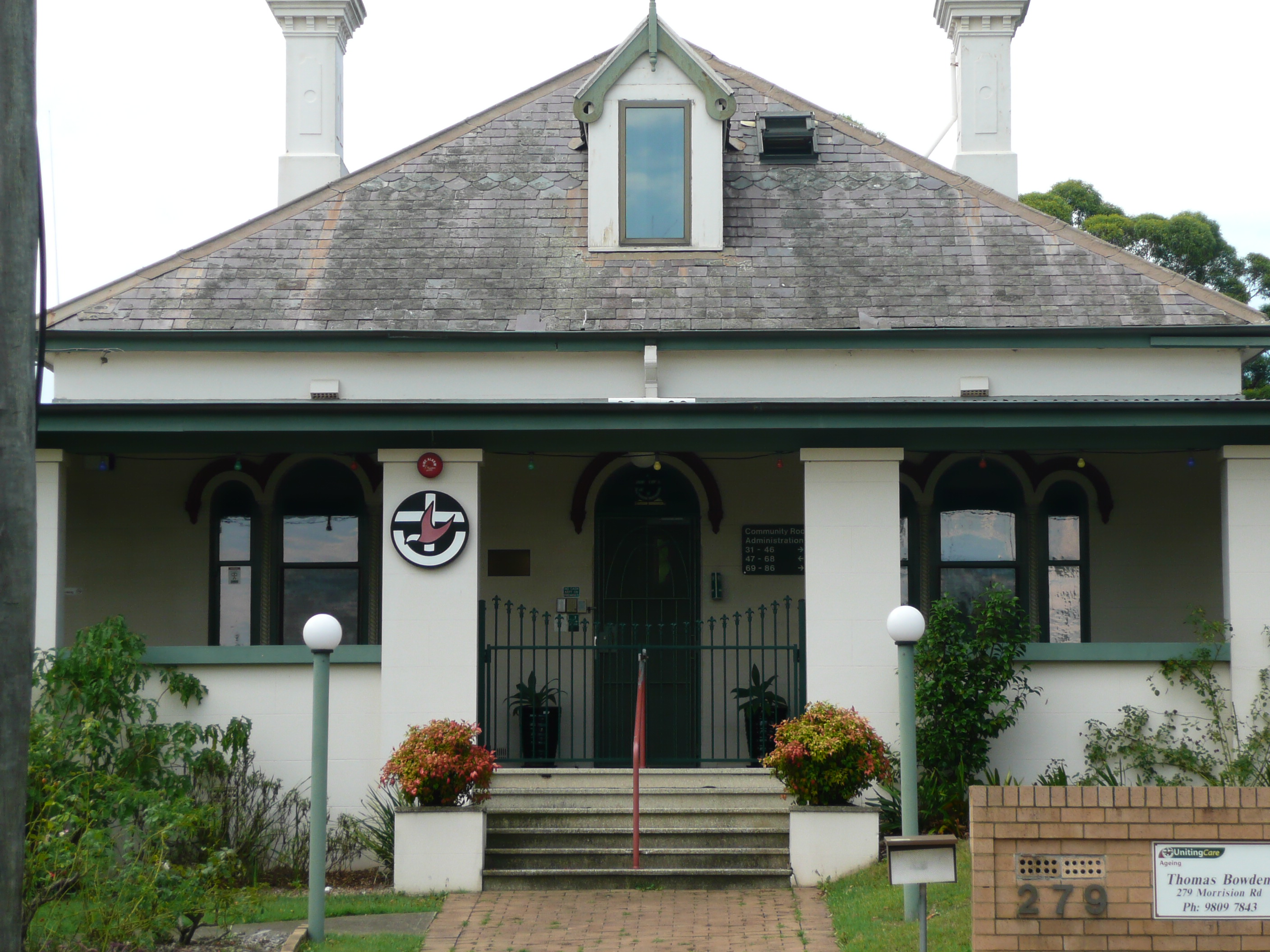
Thomas Bowden Retirement Village, Morrison Road

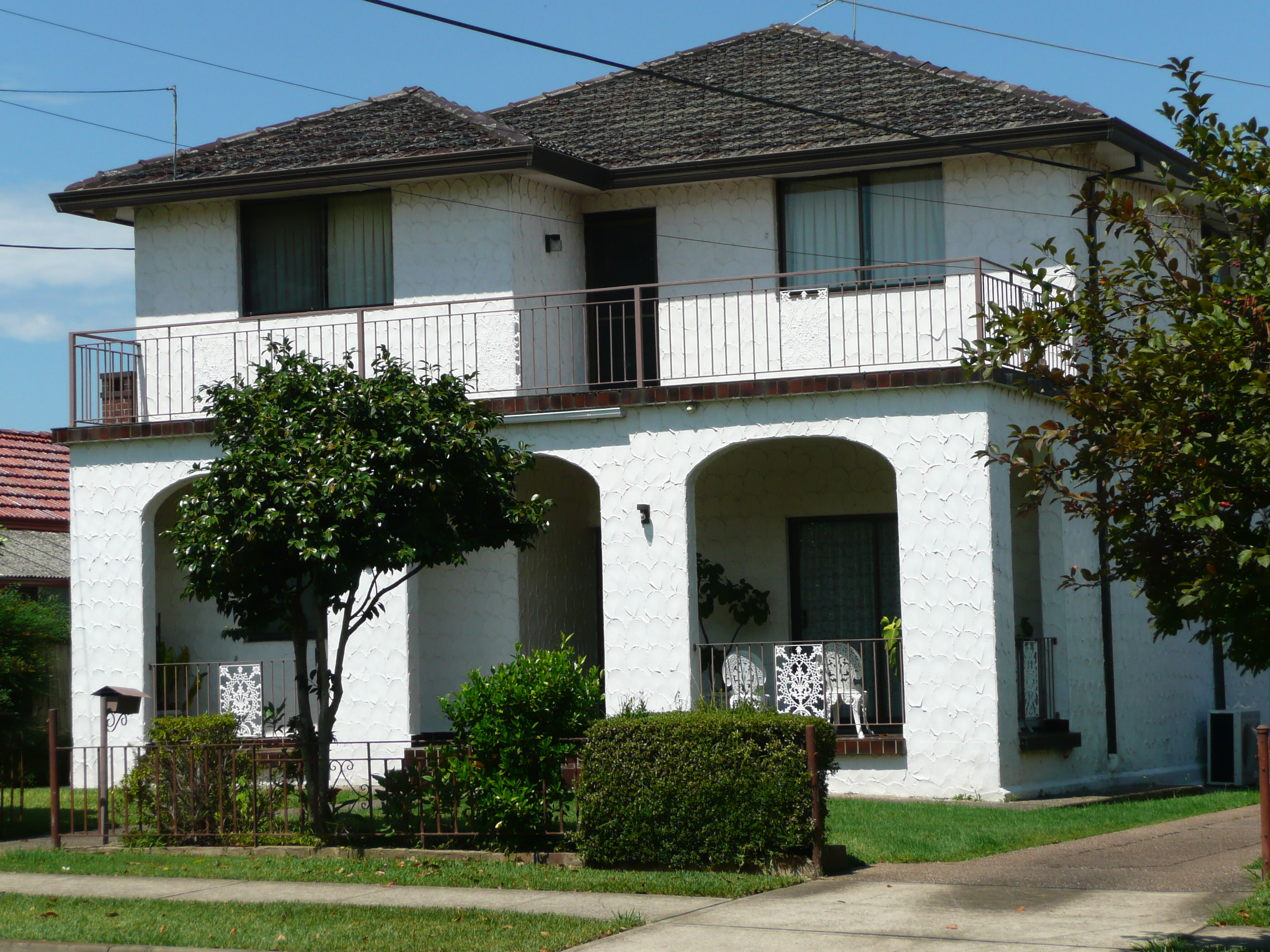
Home in Spanish Mission style, Douglas Street

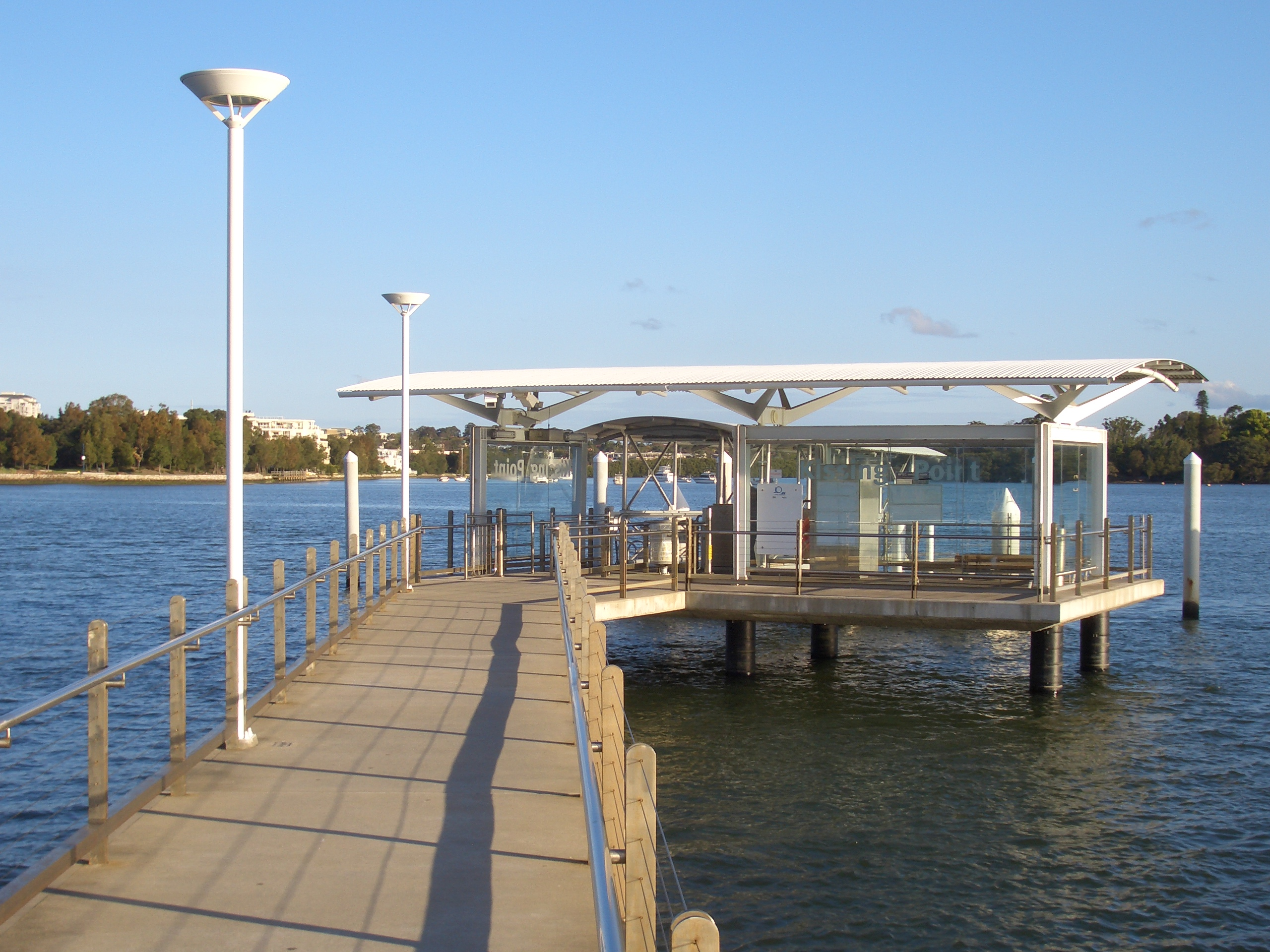
Kissing Point Wharf
