= Addington House =

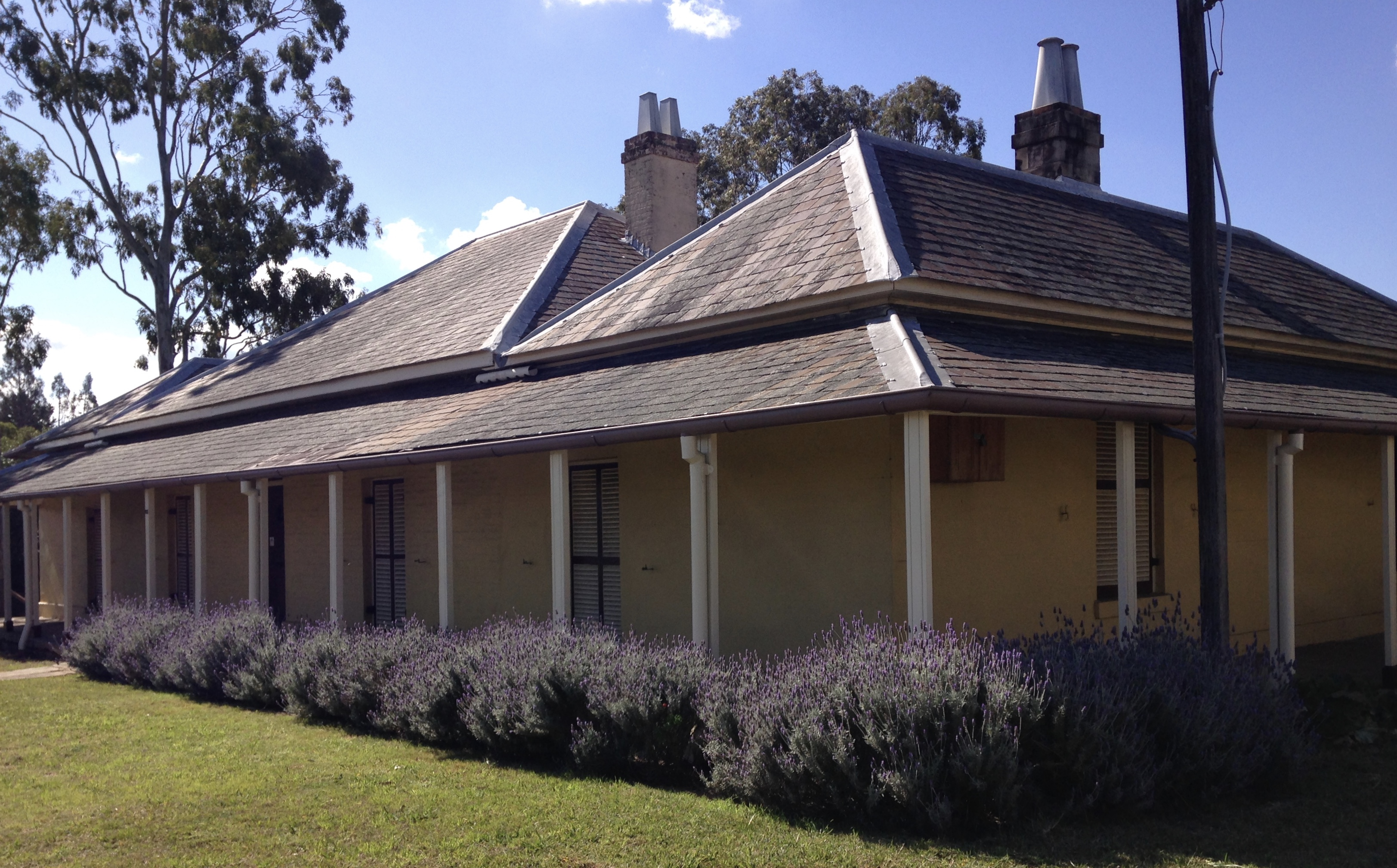
- Addington House, 2018

- Location within Sydney Location within Australia
- 33°48′52″S 151°05′55″E
- Location: 813 Victoria Road, Ryde, City of Ryde, New South Wales, Australia

History
- Built: 1794–1841

Site notes
- Owner: City of Ryde

New South Wales Heritage Register
- Official name: Addington House; New Farm
- Type: State heritage (complex / group)
- Designated: 2 April 1999
- Reference no.: 33
- Type: Homestead Complex
- Category: Farming and Grazing
- Builders: James Stewart; James Shepherd; Thomas Bowden; (different sections)

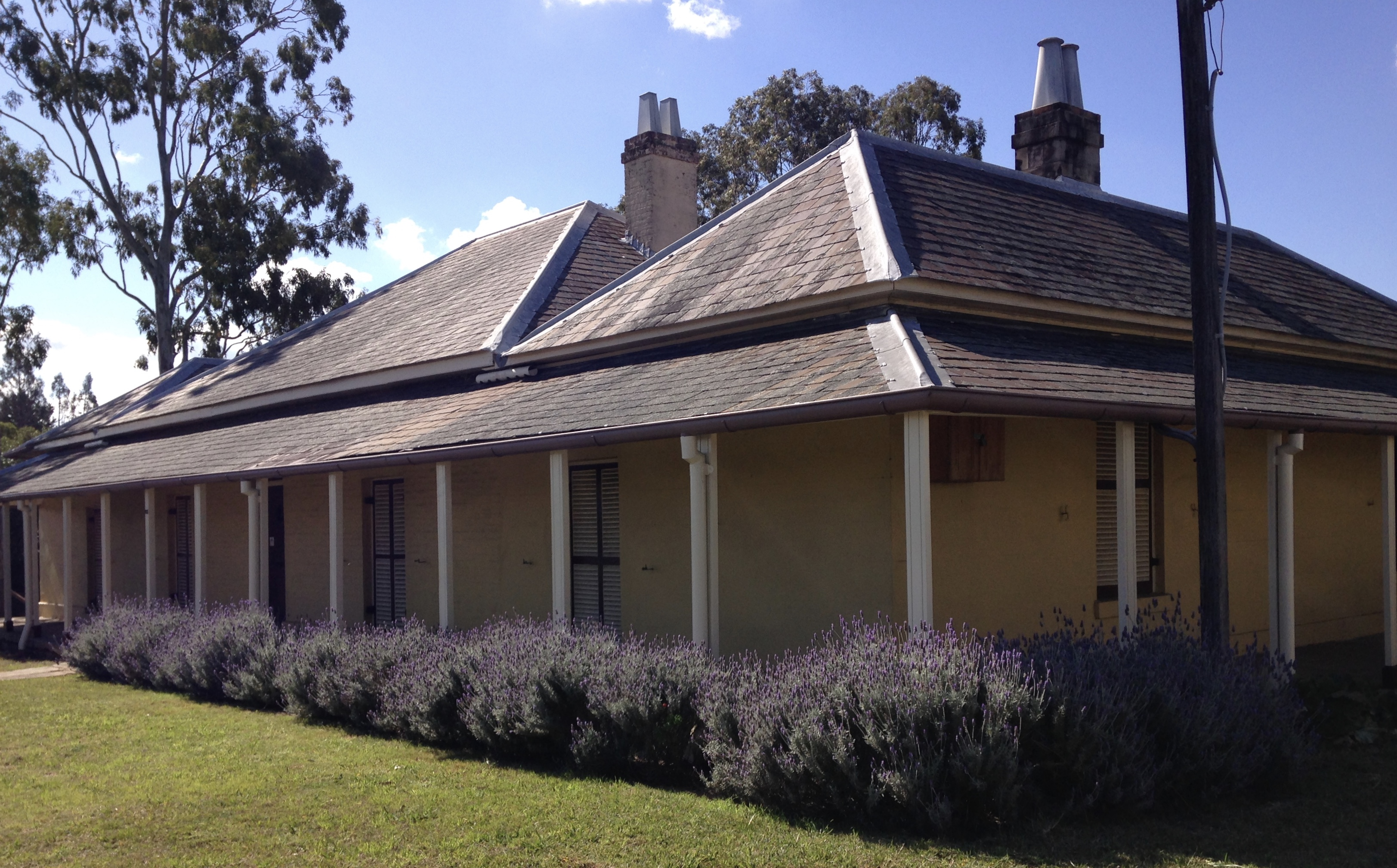
Addington House in 2018

Addington House is a heritage-listed former farm, residence and orchard and now community facility located at 813 Victoria Road, Ryde, New South Wales, Australia. It was built from 1794 to 1841 in different stages by James Stewart, James Shepherd, Thomas Bowden. It is also known as New Farm. The property is owned by City of Ryde. It was added to the New South Wales State Heritage Register on 2 April 1999.

== History ==
The Ryde area was highly suitable for farming and orchards, and early grants to marines were given to encourage agriculture. In 1792 land in the area was granted to 8 marines; two of the grants were in the modern area of Ryde. Isaac Archer and John Colethread each received 32 hectares (80 acres) of land on the site of the present Ryde-Parramatta Golf Links, now in West Ryde. Later in 1792, in the Eastern Farms area, twelve grants, most of them about 12 hectares (30 acres), were made to convicts. Much later these farms were bought by John Macarthur, Gregory Blaxland and the Reverend Samuel Marsden. The district remained an important orchard area throughout the 19th century.

=== James Stewart and family ===
Between 1794 and 1806 emancipated convict James Stewart owned this 12-hectare (30-acre) grant, (the area) named "New Farm" – it was now 1/12 of the original grants made at "Kissing Point" as the area was then known. He built a small three-room cottage of sandstock bricks. In 1798 farmers at Kissing Point registered complaints to Governor Hunter about poor control exercised over the receipt of grain at the public stores in Sydney. One of these farmers was James Stewart. Stewart died in 1806 and the estate was auctioned, including "a good dwelling house" and effects.

=== James Shepherd and family ===
James Shepherd owned New Farm's 12 hectares (30 acres) between 1809 and 1933. Shepherd acquired the farm in 1809 for A£70. It is uncertain when Addington was first built. Architectural evidence suggests that the earliest part of the house may date to 1810 and it was first occupied by Isaac Shepherd. In 1810 the property was taken over by Shepherd, who completed the central section by building a six-room sandstone house around the original three-room cottage.

1822 Thomas Bowden, the colony's first professional school teacher, added the west wing and in 1840 the east wing was added. It is of rubble sandstone. In 1820 Thomas Bowden, the colony's second school master, added three rooms and attics in front of the cottage. In 1825 the west wing was added (part has since been demolished) and Bowden started the first Boarding School in the colony here.

In 1830 40 rods of New Farm were sold by James Shepherd (son of the James Shepherd who bought the farm in 1809), on the south-east boundary of the original 12-hectare (30-acre) grant.

Between 1833 and 1876 Isaac Shepherd (son of James) "leased and released" New Farm. Shepherd was noted as being "at Kissing Point, Parramatta" in 1834–36. During the 1860s and 1870s Thomas Kendall Bowden and his wife Mary Elizabeth (née Shepherd) occupied Addington. The western wing of two bedrooms and a verandah were added in about 1832. The first phase of building (Area 1 north and south wings) is attributed to the period 1833–1876. The 1846 mortgage provides evidence which is critical for this interpretation. It is the earliest documentary evidence that relates to standing structures on the site. Also it specifies that after the transaction of 1833 a residence was erected for Isaac Shepherd on the site. Neither archaeological nor architectural evidence can conclusively indicate any earlier date for this construction. The map of 1841 records this first phase of building. Hence on the evidence available it is possible to narrow the dating of this phase to the 1833–41 period.

An 1841 map of Ryde bearing the name James Shepherd on the land originally granted to James Stewart shows an L-shaped house on the site of the existing Addington House. In 1842 Isaac Shepherd and his wife sold part of New Farm, on the south-west of Stewart's original 12-hectare (30-acre) grant, by the road from Sydney to Parramatta. In 1846 New Farm was included in the property listed by Isaac Shepherd for mortgage. One acre of the original 12-hectare (30-acre) grant has already been sold and the "residence of Mr I. Shepherd" has been built on the remaining 12 hectares (29 acres).

In 1850 the east wing (three rooms) was added (one has since been demolished) using old bricks of Stewart's cottage which were so soft that they crumble when touched - these were preserved by a veneer of harder brickwork and numerous coats of paint on the interior. In 1861 another three rooms and attics in front of the original structure were constructed for Thomas and Mary Elizabeth Bowden (née Shepherd). In 1873 the Bowdens built a ballroom and redecorated. In 1875 a Sydney solicitor Thomas Kendall Bowden, son-in-law of Isaac Shepherd, was noted as living at Addington.

=== Thomas Bowden and family ===
Between 1876 and 1896 the farm was left in trust jointly to Isaac Shepherd's son Isaac James Shepherd and his daughter Mary Elizabeth Bowden (née Shepherd), her husband Thomas Kendall Bowden and their children. The Bowdens had the option of becoming the tenants or landlords of Addington. After the 1879 death of Thomas Bowden the property was leased to many tenants. For a short time Addington was home to Sir Henry Parkes, NSW Premier and "Father of Federation". It was later home to the Benson family - well known in the Ryde district.

=== Other residences ===
Other residents include John F. Loxton, a surveyor, who was resident during 1882; A. W. Sutton, a resident during 1889; A. G. Walker, a squatter who occupied Addington during 1891 and 1893; and Thomas K. Bowden, a resident between 1894 and 1895. In 1895 William Henry Flavelle and Alexander Reith Troup and others became trustees of Addington for the creditors of Mary Elizabeth Bowden. Between 1896 and 1908 Addington was owned by Mabel Genevieve Bowden and Florence Edith Bowden (daughters of Mary Elizabeth Bowden). Mabel and Florence had reclaimed ownership for the Bowden family in 1896.

It was occupied by:

- W. C. Burton 1896–97;
- M. Montgomery 1898–99; W.
- Boyce Allen 1900–01;
- Thomas C. Read 1904;
- John W. Pickworth 1905–06;
- Joseph Payer 1907;
- Richard H. Owen 1908;
- Hugh McManamey 1910–11

In 1909 the property was brought under the provisions of the Real Property Act of 1900, valued at A£1,610 and was rented out. Between 1908 and 1919, the house was owned by Edith Harriette Rogers (house and zero point four zero hectares (one acre) of land). The rest of the land, 12.24 hectares (30.25 acres) was purchased by Edith Harriette Rogers in 1911. Occupied by R. H. Owen 1908 and H. McManamey 1910-11 as above. In 1913 the property was surrendered for consolidation and then subdivision into a number of separate lots. Addington House (1 rod 16.25 perches) became lots 23 and 24 and was rented. 1919 Lots 23 & 24 of Addington estate (Addington: house only) was bought by Sydney Albert Benson. The Benson family were a family of orchardists, well known in the Ryde district. They still owned Addington in 1979. In 1950 Sydney Robert Benson and Norman Christopher Willis became joint tenants and newly registered owners. In 1952 it was transferred to Lillian Mary Benson.

=== Community ownership ===
A private trust was formed with the aim of buying Addington, restoring it for use as a historic home and museum. In 1970 the property was purchased for $25,000 by The Addington Trust.

In 1975 archaeological testing was done to try to confirm the earliest phases of Addington's development. Some documentary evidence suggested that some part of the residence may have commenced as early as 1794. IF found to be the case, Addington would be classified as one of the earliest houses in the colony and the earliest house in the Ryde area. Between 23 and 24 August a test trench was dug by Maureen Byrne to test how the brick and sandstone structure related to the brick structure. The submerged north wall of Area 4, an uncovered clay packed "feeder" drain leading to an underground water storage tank c. 4 metres (13 ft) distant, a four-sided stone-built drain running between a drip stone at the Area 4's north-eastern corner predating the north and east walls of the stone and brick structure. The foundations in this corner were shown to be random rubble and there was an abuttal between east and north walls.

Another trench was excavated in the southwest corner of Area 1 to test the relationship between the common wall (Areas 4 and 1) and west wall of Area 1. No evidence of a former floor level were found. A third test trench was dug inside the north wing of Area 1 where Areas 1, 2 and 5 converge to test the relationship between foundation stones in the west and south walls of the north wing, thus the phasing of the north and south wings' construction. This confirmed that Area 2 is later than Area 1 (north wing). Inspection of Area 2 pre-excavation revealed a coursed random rubble stone building differing from the building on Area 1 (south wing) in terms of method of construction, materials used and level of the main floor. Thus archaeological evidence gave some additional supportive information for this interpretation of the phasing.

Ryde Municipal Council purchased Addington in 1985 and have undertaken several conservation programs of works.

== Description ==
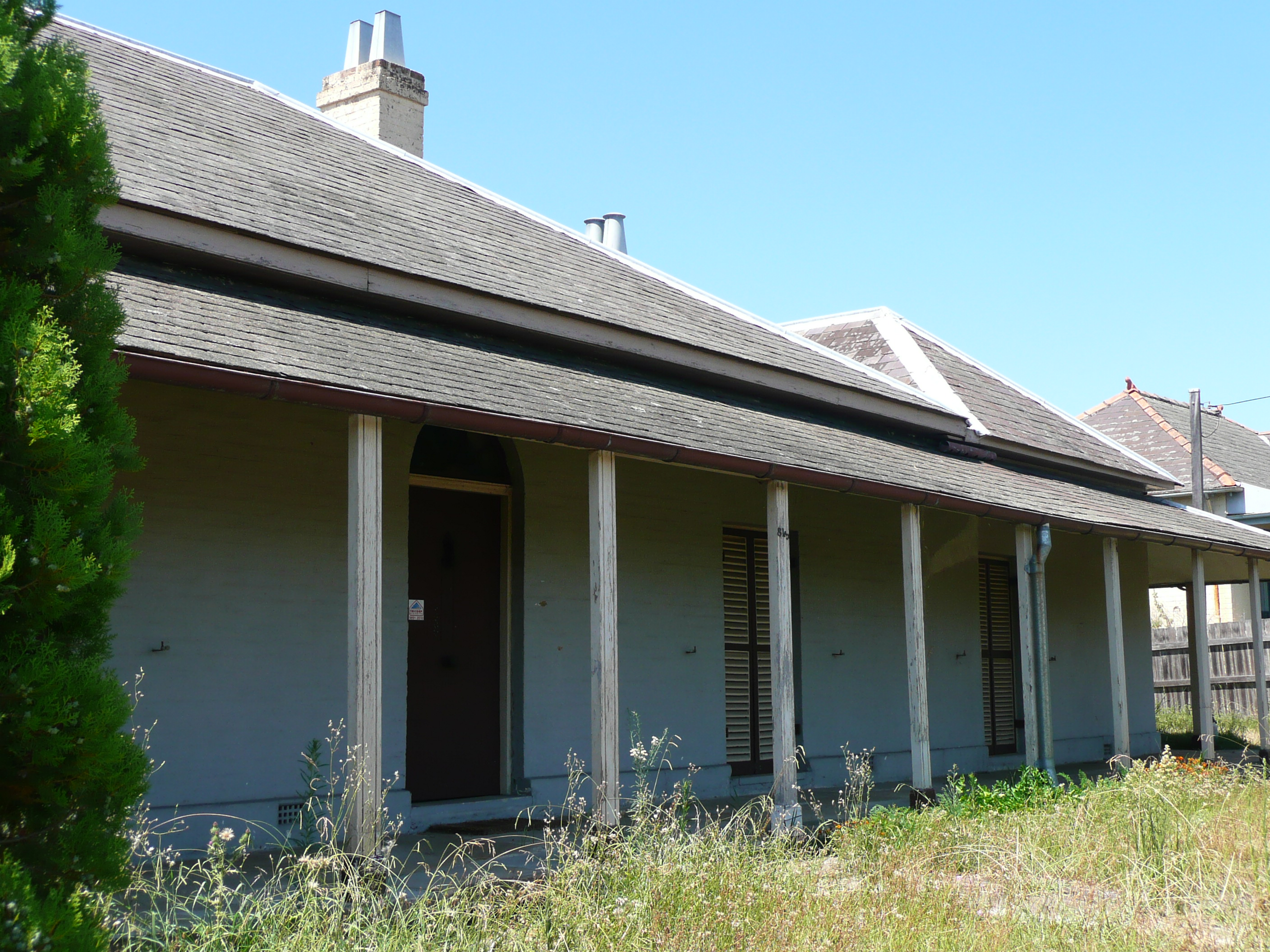
Later additions to Addington House, pictured in 2009.

A colonial single-storey sandstone house with a brick wing at the rear and a two-room attic. The hip roofs are of slate, the main roof has a rear dormer to the attic with flashing hips over the east and west wings. East wing is of rubble sandstone.

A slate roofed verandah, supported by simple rectangular posts onto stone flags, borders the house on the eastern and southern sides. Colonial shuttered French doors open onto the verandah.

The façade facing Victoria Road is symmetrical with three hipped roof forms; two room attic in the central portion. There is a straight pitched verandah to the east and south supported on simple rectangular timber posts. Roofs are of slate with portions of restored Morewood and Rogers type iron tiles. There is a central front door and four pairs of shuttered French doors opening onto the stone flagged verandah. External joinery and door furniture, including six panel front door and fanlight, are generally intact, but few original internal fittings have survived. There is a stone outbuilding at the rear and a freestanding oven (J Ward) with areas of stone paving and remains of other footings.

=== Condition ===
As at 13 January 2015, external joinery was mostly intact, stone work on main portion of house appears sound. The house is substantially waterproof. Internally most original fittings have not survived and there is some damp. Floors and ceilings are in fair condition where not replaced.

External joinery and door furniture, including six panel front door and fanlight, are generally intact, but few original internal fittings have survived.

Abbreviated findings of 1988 Stocks report (stage 1 of restoration works):

- an extensive area of paving was found to the rear (north) of the house and its different stages were identified. Other paths and paved areas were observed, where possible, near the cistern, stable, driveway and front (south) of house.
- the nature of the "stable" outbuilding to the NE of the site was investigated, and it was found to be the expected size and extent, i.e.: a long rectangular structure running E of the privvy [sic]. Lack of a south wall and the sandstone floor packing and paving was not anticipated. Its function is interpreted to have been a doorway or open area that continued south as a driveway.
- a trench excavated in the stable provided evidence of pre-stable surface and rubbish disposal behaviour of the mid-late 19th century – yielding useful and displayable artefacts
- areas 5–8 yielded information on aspects of Addington's construction – structural details of the dripstones feeding water into the box drain and of the ballroom floor and cistern were revealed. The ballroom's occupation deposits are well protected below ground and the area obviously has great archaeological potential.
- the area close to the cistern was revealed to have been a refuse area in late 19–20th centuries, making it another (comparable) source of info on behaviour and lifestyles of Addington's occupants
- adjacent properties to Addington also contain evidence of the earlier farm, particularly behind no.s 809, 811 and 815 Victoria Road. Any redevelopment of these houses should be noted and appropriate action taken
- the interior of Addington is capable of providing much info about its residents and change in room functions over time. No works should be done on the house without consulting the Heritage Council of NSW, and Burra Charter.
- the fact that much of the flooring of the house is presently (1988) raised in preparation for stage 2 of the restoration makes below-floor deposits very accessible for archaeol. Investigation. (perhaps more so than ever again). However unless these deposits are investigated as part of a broad and far-reaching program it is best they should be left alone, and thus preserved for the future. An adequate research design would necessitate the excavation of all the undisturbed deposits. (continues) Whole rooms must be looked at, including those in the attic.
- the large "foreign" objects that are found on the grounds of Addington should either be kept appropriately or given back to their previous owners (dumped). If they are to be kept, adequate procedures must be undertaken for their preservation and display, e.g.; the stump jump plough and mangle are rusting and need conservation.
- the sandstone and brick rubble should be assessed for value and if it cannot be used in any way on site should be dumped or sold. If used on site, a record of where it goes must be kept.
- records and finds of stage 1 archaeological project are not remaining with Council or at Addington. Written and photographic records will be kept at the Heritage Council of NSW. Artefacts have been boxed and will eventually be housed at the Museum of Applied Arts and Sciences (later the Powerhouse Museum). Records and artefacts of Pat Burritt's 1980 excavation are at the places described above and it is appropriate that they are put together.
- records, artefacts and memory of the members of the Addington Trust, esp. J. Rich, should be fully investigated prior to any final decision about objects on the site and the way it is to be presented to the public
- further investigation/testing of the driveway for possible construction details is recommended. Auger testing is a method that can be employed initially.
- further investigation of the outbuildings area NE of the house, especially behind #811 Victoria Road, is recommended, as is testing of areas behind #815 Victoria Road.
- ensuring that the privvy [sic] area is undisturbed until it can be excavated to fund evidence of the diet and health of residents via long-drop deposits, is recommended.
- it is recommended that an archaeologist be employed during stage 2 of the restoration project to ensure that the resource of the site is not damaged and appropriate actions are taken on discovery of useful features. The archaeologist should be part of the decision-making process when the work strategy and aims of the project are considered and finalised. Such a consultant should be employed to help prepare a Conservation Plan for Addington as well as for any future plans for the site by Council.

=== Modifications and dates ===
- Post 1794 / pre 1810 first three-roomed cottage built.
- 1810 central section rebuilt as six-room house around the original cottage.
- 1822 west wing added.
- 1840 east wing added.

Archaeological and documentary evidence suggests construction between 1833 and 1841, with further additions until the 1870s. The house was built in at least four separate stages, the brick walled rear wing being one of the earliest sections, pre-1840. c. 1991 attic's rear facing dormer windows replaced.

- 1794 12 hectares (30 acres) of land. 1908–1919 E. H. Rogers owns house and 1 acre of land. Rest of land (? Acres?) purchased by E. H. Rogers in 1911.

== Heritage listing ==
As at 6 August 2002, an important surviving example of early Australian colonial architecture. It has important historic associations with the Ryde area and the early colony. (National Trust of NSW, 1981 (sic).

Addington is the oldest surviving building in Ryde. It has associations with the early nineteenth century settlement of Ryde and it is a rare and important example in the Ryde area of vernacular farmhouse construction of the 1830s. It has a prominent position on the main road and its architectural character, contrasting with the predominant post World War One suburban development in the vicinity, provides clear evidence of its distinctive history and rarity value. It has archaeological potential and architectural research value.

Addington House was listed on the New South Wales State Heritage Register on 2 April 1999.

== See also ==
- Australian residential architectural styles
