= St Anne's Church, Ryde =

St Anne's Church
- St Anne's Anglican Church
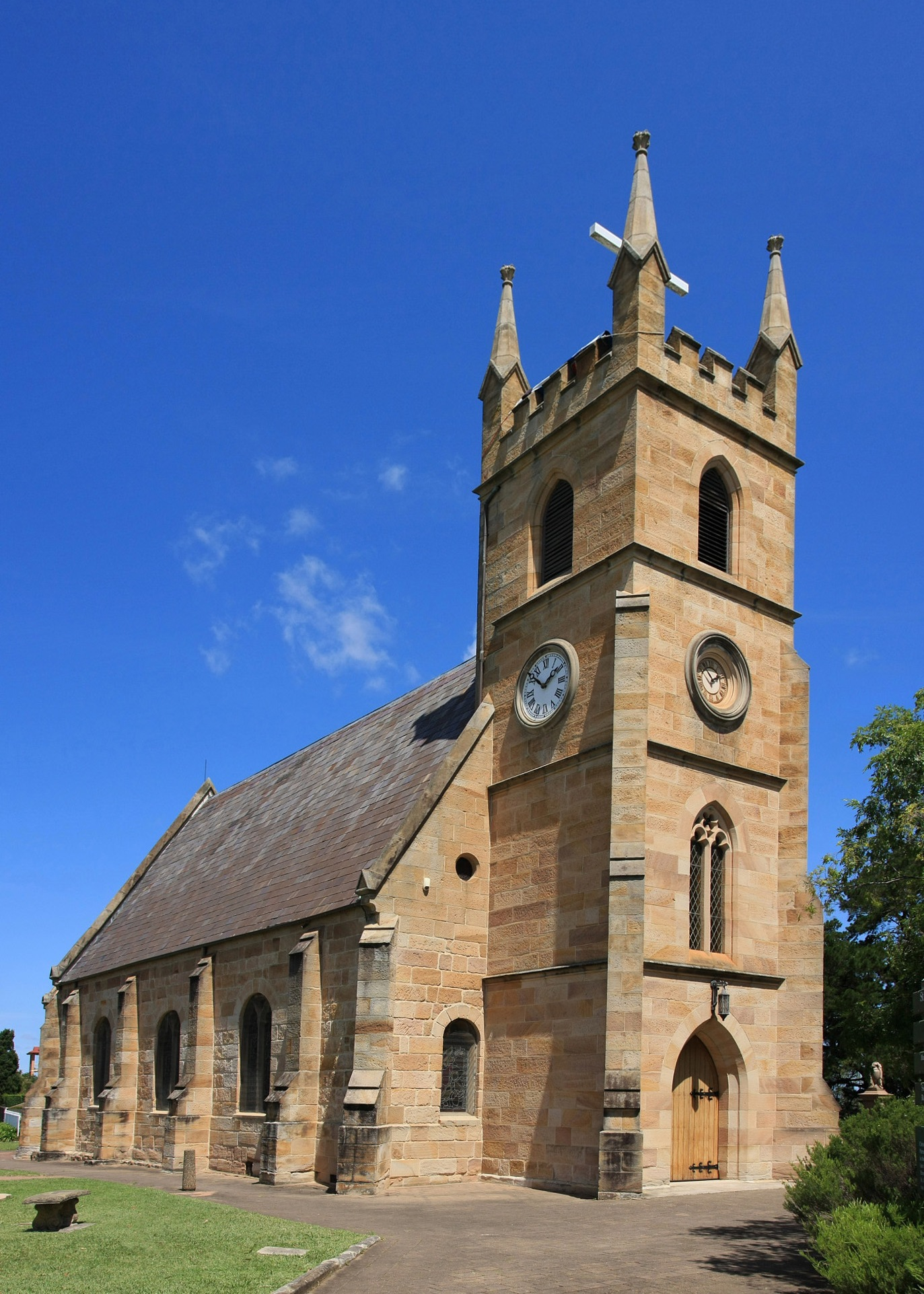
- St Anne's Church
- 33°48′56″S 151°06′15″E
- Location: 46 Church Street, Ryde, City of Ryde, New South Wales
- Country: Australia
- Denomination: Anglican
- Website: www.stannes.org.au

History
- Status: Church

Architecture
- Functional status: Active

Administration
- Diocese: Sydney

St Anne's Anglican Church is a heritage-listed Anglican church building located at 46 Church Street, Ryde, City of Ryde, New South Wales, Australia.

== History ==
In the adjacent graveyard, the grave of Maria Ann Sherwood Smith, in whose orchards the Granny Smith apple was first found, is located.

== Heritage listing ==
St Anne's Anglican Church is listed on the New South Wales State Heritage Register.

== Gallery ==
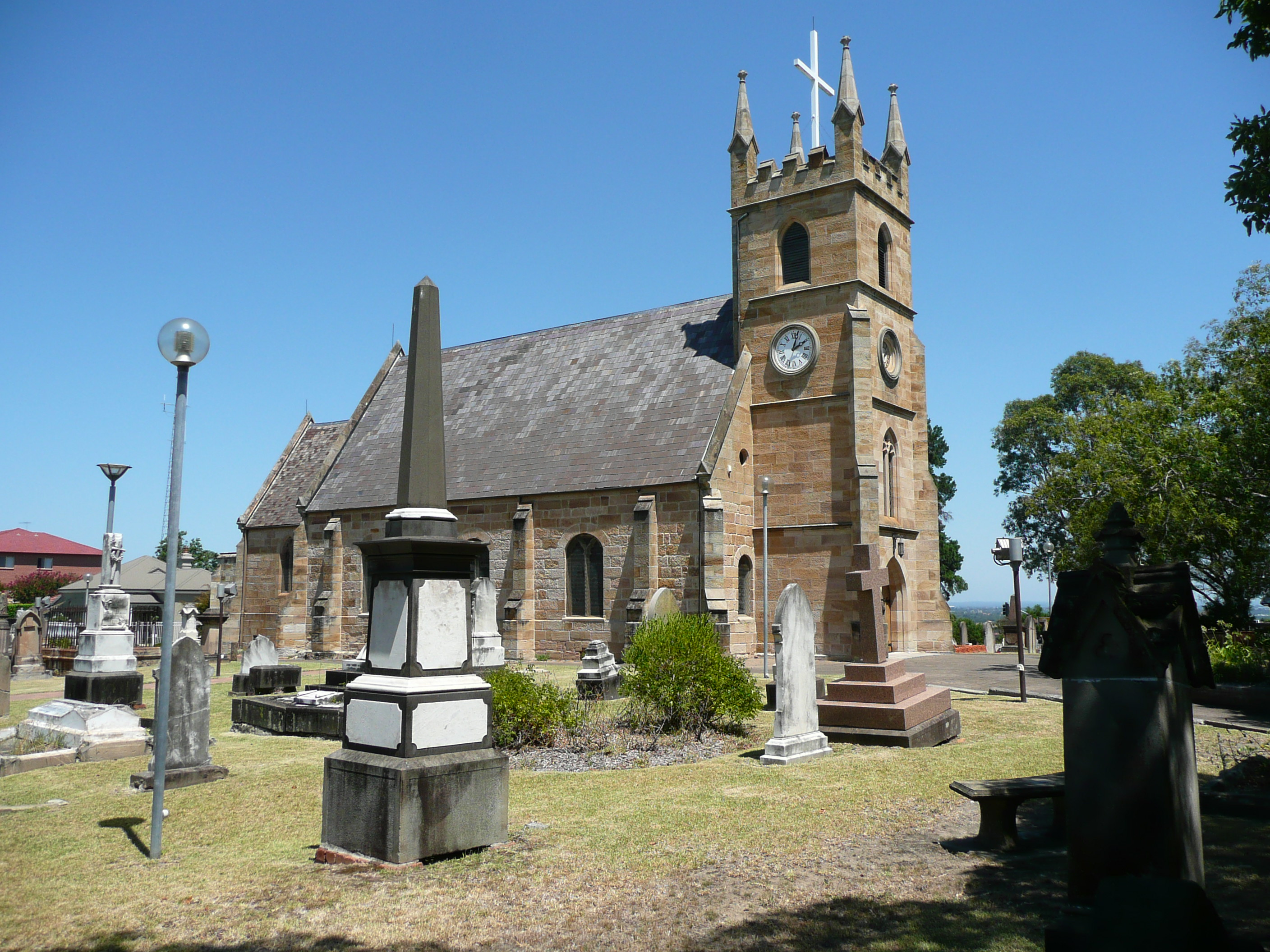
St. Anne's Anglican Church.

== See also ==
- Australian non-residential architectural styles
- List of Anglican churches in the Diocese of Sydney
