= 2RRR =

Coordinates: 33.82594°S 151.136438°E

- Australia
- Broadcast area: Lower North Shore Sydney
- Frequency: 88.5 MHz FM

Programming
- Format: Community radio

Ownership
- Owner: Ryde Regional Radio Co-operative

History
- First air date: 1984

2RRR is a community radio station based in Ryde in Sydney. It is licensed to cover part of the Lower North Shore suburbs, including Ryde, Hunters Hill, Gladesville and Eastwood.

2RRR aims to provide a broadcast facility that encourages community participation and gives a voice to people who are not represented by the mainstream media.

== History ==
2RRR was the brainchild of a group of local residents in 1976. These local groups discussed the need for and costs to set up such a station for a number of years. It was not until 1982 when the federal government invited applications for nine C Class Public Broadcasting Licences in the Sydney metropolitan area. A steering committee was immediately established and set about the task of preparing a license application. Following a public hearing on 3 September 1982 the then Australian Broadcasting Tribunal granted a licence to 2RRR. For the next eighteen months four committees worked to get the station on-air.

At first, the station only broadcast three days a week on Friday, Saturday and Sunday with news, interviews, local issues and a variety of music. Broadcast hours were gradually increased and 1986 saw 2RRR begin its extensive and ongoing involvement in outside broadcasts.

In 1988 the station moved its studios to the historic Henley Cottage in Henley.

== Current ==
2RRR has been involved in compiling and releasing CDs of specialist music tied in with station programs. Two editions featured Australian heavy metal music and one was of gothic rock.

== Programming ==
The station's current programs cover a wide range of music genres including jazz, country, heavy metal and classical music. The station also broadcasts programs that are presented by special interest groups or in languages other than English.

== See also ==
- List of radio stations in Australia
