= Ryde, New South Wales =

Ryde
- Suburb
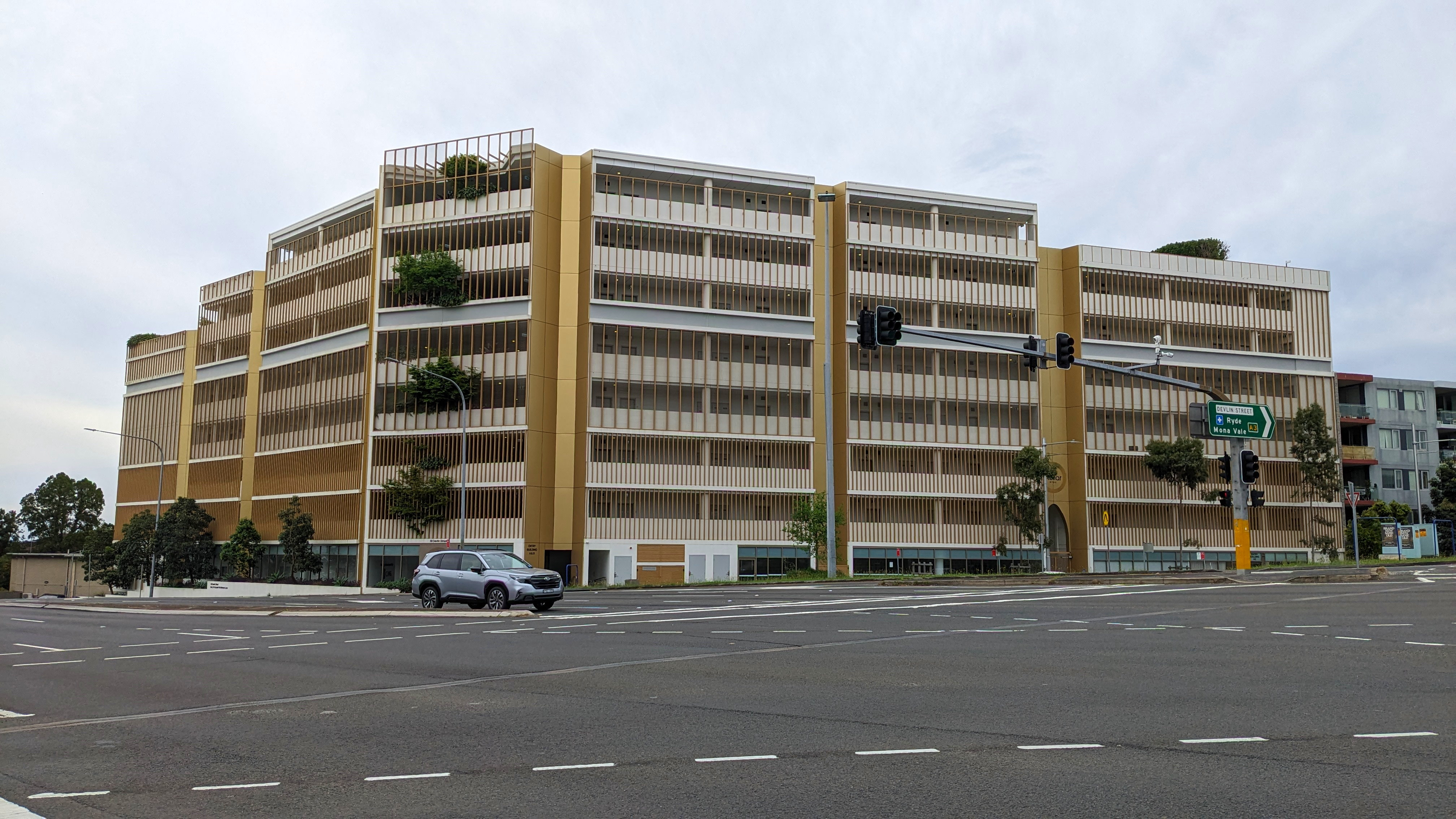
- Stellar Apartments, an example of the redevelopment of the Ryde area, pictured in October 2025

- Interactive map of Ryde
- Country: Australia
- State: New South Wales
- Region: Northern Sydney
- City: Sydney
- LGA: City of Ryde
- Location: 13 km (8.1 mi) north-west of Sydney CBD

Government
  - State electorates: Lane Cove; Ryde
  - Federal division: Bennelong

Area
  - Total: 7.1 km^{2} (2.7 sq mi)
- Elevation: 59 m (194 ft)

Population
  - Total: 31,907 (2021 census)
  - Density: 4,490/km^{2} (11,640/sq mi)
- Postcode: 2112
Suburbs around Ryde
Eastwood	Marsfield	North Ryde
West Ryde Denistone East	Ryde	East Ryde
Meadowbank	Putney Tennyson Point	Gladesville

Ryde is a suburb of Sydney, New South Wales, Australia. Ryde is located 13 kilometres (8 mi) north-west of the Sydney central business district and 8 kilometres (5 mi) east of Parramatta. Ryde is the administrative centre of the local government area of the City of Ryde and part of the Northern Sydney region. It lies on the north bank of the Parramatta River. People from Ryde are colloquially known as Ryders, Rydiens or Rydemen.

North Ryde, West Ryde, and East Ryde are separate suburbs from Ryde.

== History ==
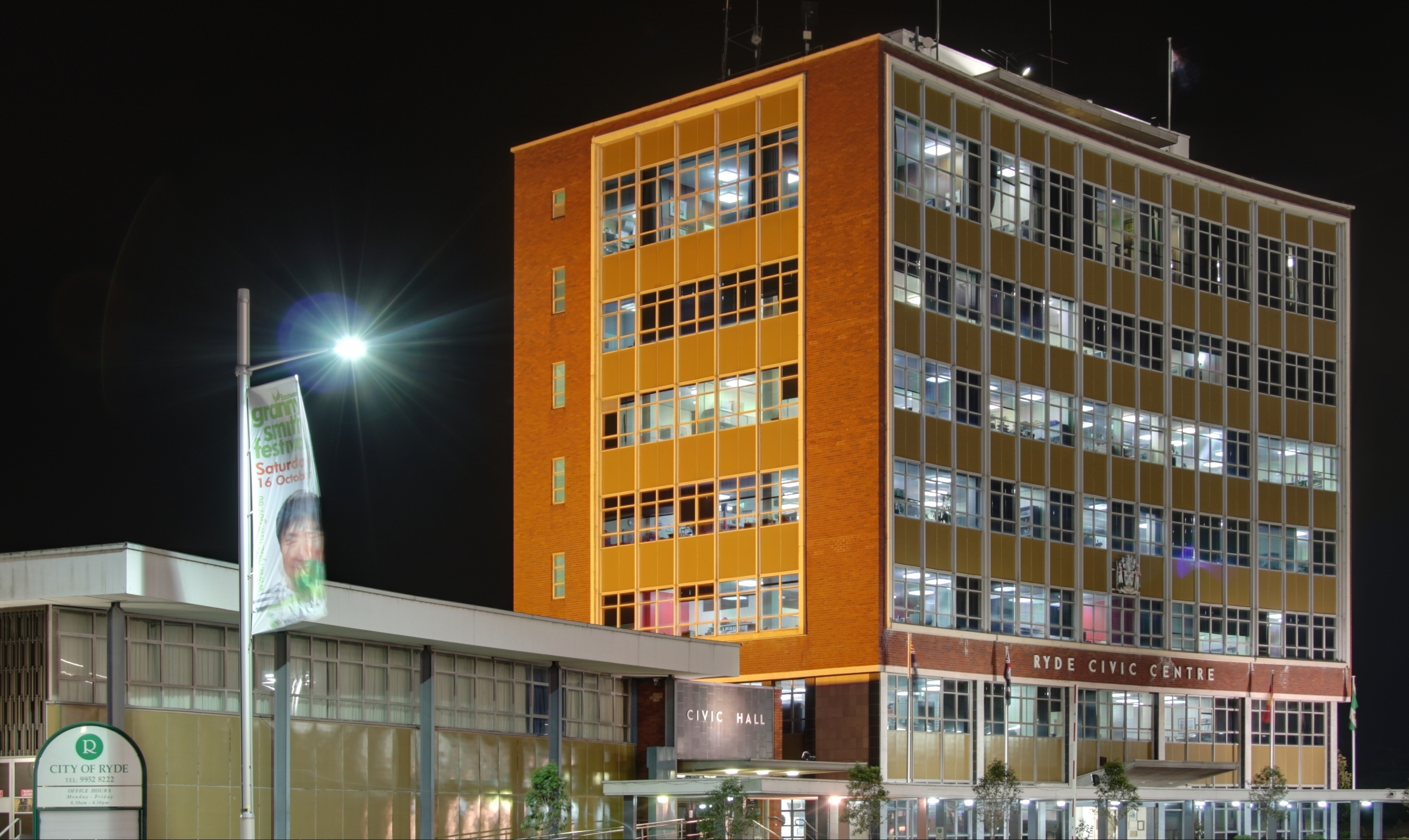
Ryde Civic Centre, now demolished, pictured in 2010

The land that makes up Ryde was inhabited by the Gai-mariagal of the Eora people before European colonisation. The Gai-mariagal used rocky outcrops on the site that is today Top Ryde, for meetings of the "clever people" and as a training and spiritual area for the Kooradji.

Ryde was named after the town of Ryde on the Isle of Wight, perhaps by G. M. Pope, who came from Ryde on the Isle of Wight, who settled in the area and opened the "Ryde Store".

Originally known by its Aboriginal name Wallumatta, it was named Eastern Farms when the first 10 land grants were made in 1792. Within a few years this had changed to Kissing Point. The road from Ryde to Parramatta was called Kissing Point Road until changed to Victoria Road in 1887. The name Ryde was used from the 1840s and adopted as the name of the municipality in 1870. The suburb contains the oldest settler's cottage in Australia, Addington, on Victoria Road. Addington was built by the emancipist James Stewart, c. 1800. James Shepherd bought the property in 1810 and added a six-room house to the original sandstone cottage. Addington House, also known as "New Farm", is included on the NSW Heritage Register and the National Trust of NSW.

Other historic buildings in the area include the police station on Victoria Road and Willandra, Willandra Street. The police station, a simple sandstone structure, was designed by Colonial Architect Mortimer Lewis and built in 1837. Willandra is a two-storey Georgian home built by the Devlin family c. 1845, and more recently used as an art gallery and headquarters for the Ryde and District Historical Society. Both Willandra and the police station are listed on the Register of the National Estate.

In 1892, the public school at 2 Tucker Street was opened. The building, which still survives, is the Infants Department, a two-storey, sandstone building which is heritage-listed.

The cottage Riversdale, in Wade Street, was the home of a well-known riverboat captain by the name of Robert Gascoigne, who lived in the area c. 1900. In 1973 a Builders Labourers Federation organised a green ban to save Dunbar Park from becoming a rubbish tip.

As Ryde was located at the top of the hill it also became known as 'Top Ryde'. Ryde Swimming Centre was demolished and rebuilt as Ryde Aquatic Leisure Centre, and hosted events of the 2000 Summer Olympics.

=== Trams ===
The majority of services operated from Fort Macquarie and Circular Quay down George Street to Broadway and Parramatta Road. In the peak hours and other busy periods, supplementary services operated from Railway Square.

Tram services to Drummoyne and Ryde were serviced by the Rozelle Tram Depot. The service, after departing the depot traveled along The Crescent and Commercial Road (now City West Link Road) in Glebe, turning left onto Victoria Road. It then crossed the Iron Cove Bridge and the former Gladesville Bridge before turning right onto Blaxland Road. It then wound its way along Blaxland Road, behind the site of the current council chambers, terminating near the intersection of Pope and Devlin Street in Ryde.

== Heritage listings ==
Ryde has a number of heritage-listed sites, including:

- 782 Victoria Road: Willandra, Ryde
- 808-810 Victoria Road: Ryde police station
- 813 Victoria Road: Addington House
- 817 Victoria Road: The Retreat, Ryde
- 46 Church Street: St Anne's Ryde Anglican Church and Cemetery

== Commercial areas ==
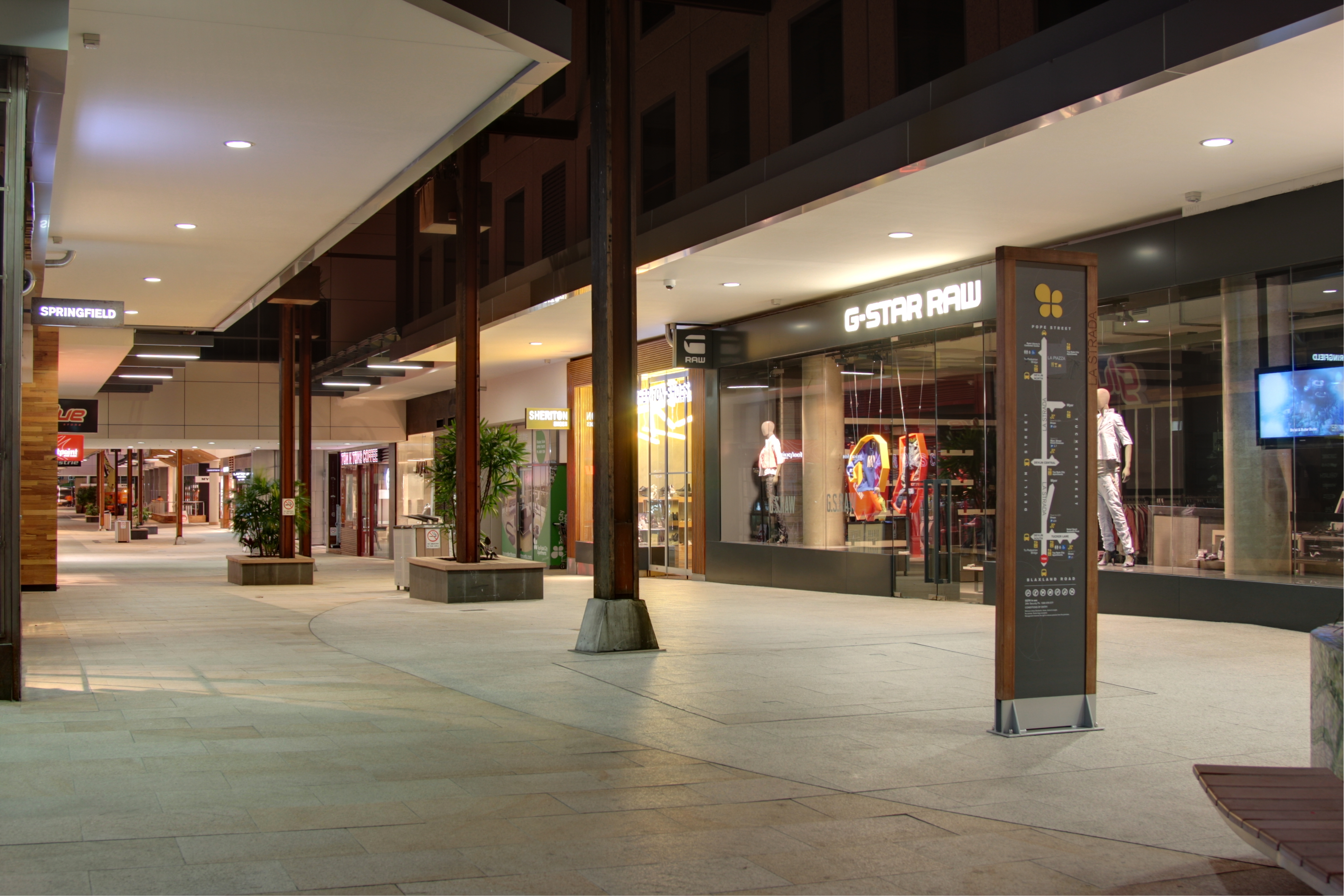
Top Ryde City

Top Ryde is an unofficial locality within Ryde, which contains the commercial area of the suburb, centred on the intersection of Devlin Street and Blaxland Road. Top Ryde City is a major shopping centre located on the intersection of Devlin Street and Blaxland Road. The original Top Ryde shopping centre on this site was the second of its type to be built in Australia.

Top Ryde is the location of the City of Ryde council office, and library.

2RRR is a community radio station in Sydney, Australia broadcasting to the Ryde area on 88.5 FM.

== Transport ==
The Ryde Bridge links Ryde south to Rhodes, over the Parramatta River. Busways and Transit Systems operate a number of services in Ryde including:

- 500X - Town Hall station to West Ryde station
- 287 - Milsons Point via Lane Cove (Weekday AM peak service)
- 410 - Marsfield to Hurstville via Lane Cove Road and Campsie
- 458 - Burwood via Concord Hospital and Strathfield
- 501 - Parramatta station to Railway Square via Victoria Road and Pyrmont
- 515 - Eastwood station to Top Ryde City
- 516 - Chatswood via North Ryde
- 517 - Macquarie University to Top Ryde City
- 518 - Meadowbank ferry wharf to Macquarie Centre via Denistone East
- 533 - Sydney Olympic Park to Chatswood via Rhodes and Lane Cove North

The main closest train station for the access to Ryde is West Ryde railway station which is on the Main Northern railway line.

== Schools ==
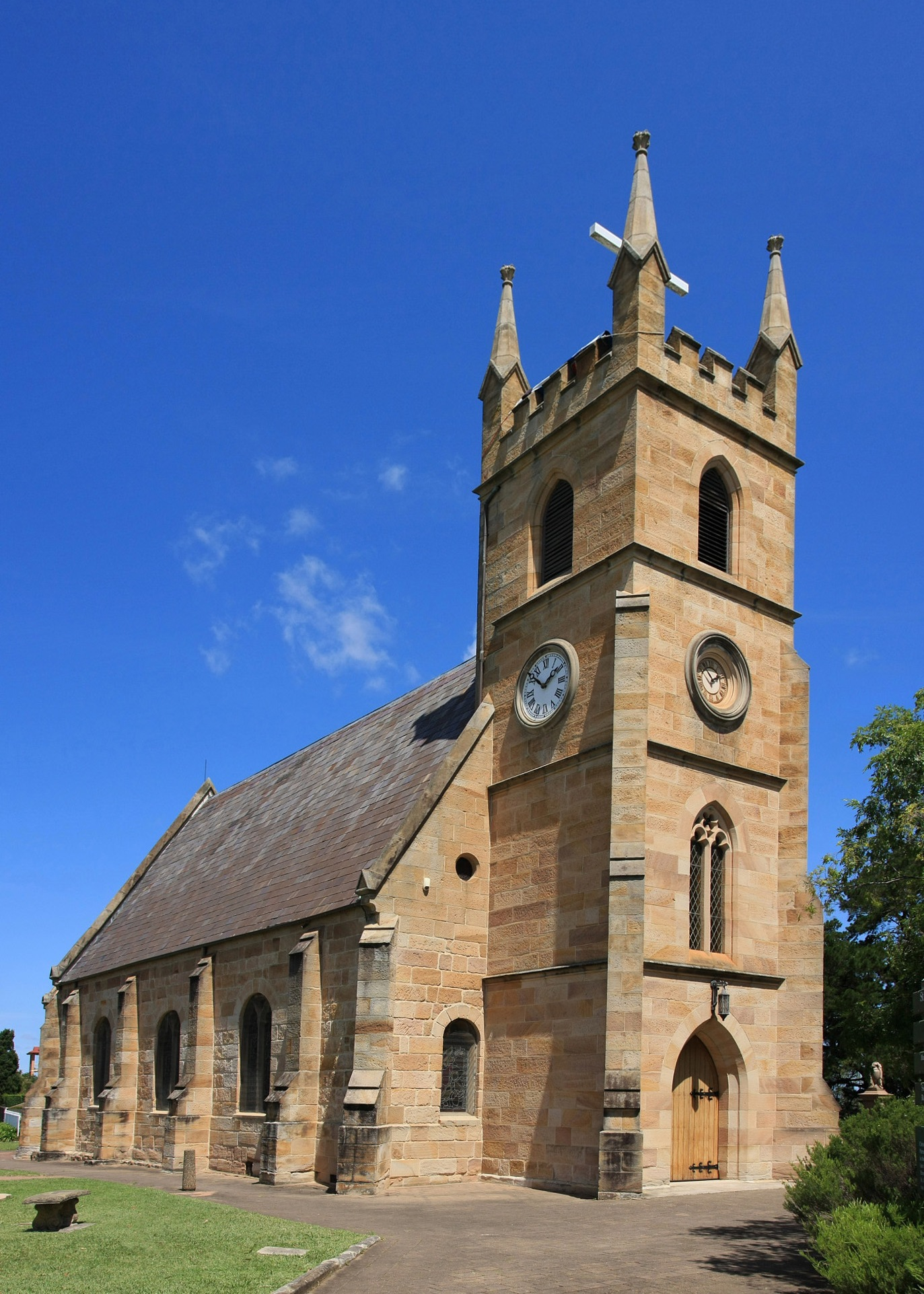
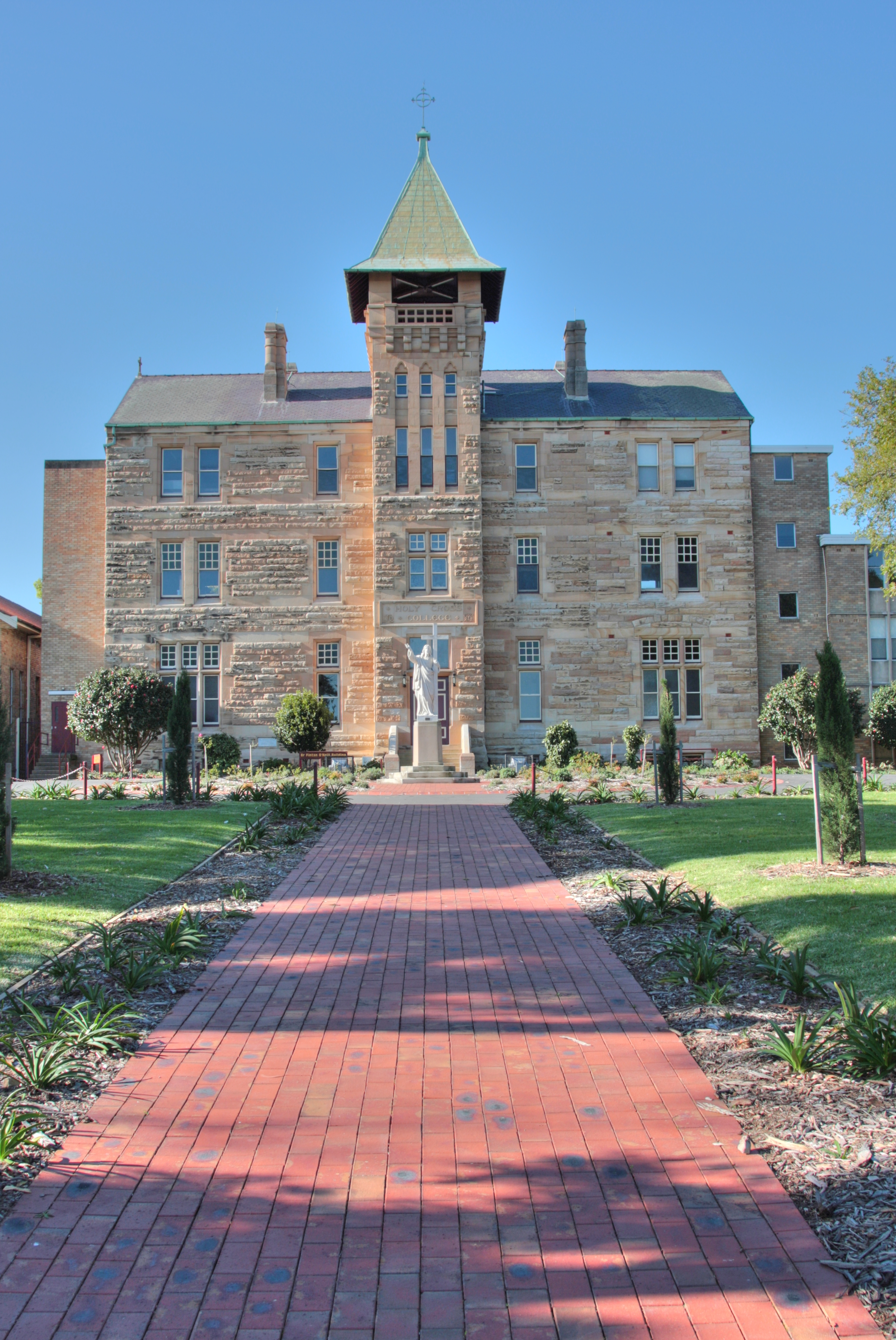
St Anne's Anglican Church, Church Street and Holy Cross College, Ryde Victoria Road

Schools in Ryde include government schools such as Ryde Secondary College (formerly Malvina High School) and Ryde Public School, Tucker Street, which is heritage-listed. It also includes the private schools Holy Cross College and Northcross Christian School. The German International School Sydney operated in Ryde from 1992 to 2008 and moved to Terrey Hills in August 2008.

== Places of worship ==
- St Anne's Anglican Church
- St Charles Borromeo Catholic Church

Ryde contains St Anne's Anglican Church, Church Street, which has the grave of Maria Ann Sherwood Smith, in whose orchards the Granny Smith apple was first found. Every year, in the suburb of Eastwood, the Granny Smith Festival is held in her honor. The church was built in 1826 and extended in later years. It was a central feature in the early life of the area and is now listed on the Register of the National Estate. Church Street is also the location of Ryde Wesley Uniting Church. C3 Church Ryde is located on Blaxland Road.

== Parks and recreation ==
Santa Rosa Park is located between Quarry Road and Bridge Road. It features a separated pathway for walking and bike riders. Shrimptons Creek runs through the park in a north-easterly direction flowing into the Lane Cove River. The park is used for football and cricket. Gannan Park was once a quarry and brickworks and is accessed from Buna Court, Minga Street and McAuley Park. Ryde Park is located between Blaxland Road, Princes Street and Argyle Avenue. It features 2 rugby fields, 1 cricket field and a basketball court as well as a play area. There is also a dog park and a cafe.

Ryde Aquatic Leisure Centre was home to water polo events for the 2000 Summer Olympics. The pool is owned by Ryde City Council.

== Population ==
=== Demographics ===
At the 2021 census, Ryde recorded a population of 31,907. Of these:

Age distribution
Ryde residents' median age was 36 years, lower than the national median of 38. Children aged 0–14 years made up 17.1% of the population (national average is 18.2%) and people aged 65 years and over made up 13.9% of the population (national average is 17.2%).
Ethnic diversity
47.4% of people were born in Australia. The most common countries of birth were China 11.0%, India 3.5%, South Korea 3.2%, Iran 2.4% and Philippines 2.2%. Only 15.2% identify their ancestry as Australian. The most common ancestry in Ryde was Chinese at 22.2% with the next most common ancestries being English 15.6%, Italian 8.0% and Irish 5.7%. 45.4% of people only spoke English at home. Other languages spoken at home included Mandarin 11.6%, Cantonese 6.0%, Korean 3.9%, Armenian 2.7% and Italian 2.4%.
Religion
The most common responses for religion were No Religion 34.1%, Catholic 24.8%, Anglican 5.8% and Islam 4.6%.
Income
The median weekly household income was $2,024, above the national median of $1,746.
Housing
68.3% of private dwellings were family households, 27.5% were single person households and 4.2% were group households. Of occupied private dwellings in Ryde, 55.7% were flats or apartments, 35.4% were separate houses and 8.8% were semi-detached.

=== Notable residents ===
- Iggy Azalea - Australian rapper born in Ryde Hospital
- Bennelong - One of the most notable Indigenous Australians, who served as a link between the colony at Port Jackson and the Eora people, is buried in present-day Putney.
- Jesse Curran - Scottish Premiership footballer who plays for Dundee F.C. as a defensive midfielder
- Laura Forster - World War I surgeon and nurse who was born in Ryde.
- David Gower - rugby league player.
- Richard Lee – chairman of Ruralco and former first-class cricketer
- Spencer Martin - racing driver
- Karen Moras - Olympic bronze medalist in swimming and world record holder, was born in Ryde in 1954.
- John Robertson - Former Leader of the Australian Labor Party in New South Wales and the Leader of the Opposition from 2011 to 2014.
- Susan Schardt (1872–1934) Founder of the Royal Rehabilitation Hospital
- Maria Ann Smith - Credited with producing the Granny Smith apple lived in Eastwood and is buried in Ryde.
- James Squire - Convict brewer, who is claimed to have created Australia's first commercial brewery.
- James Tedesco - rugby league player.
- Hayden Turner - Zookeeper and TV presenter.
- John Watkins - The former Deputy Premier of NSW and Minister for Transport and Finance in NSW.

== Gallery ==
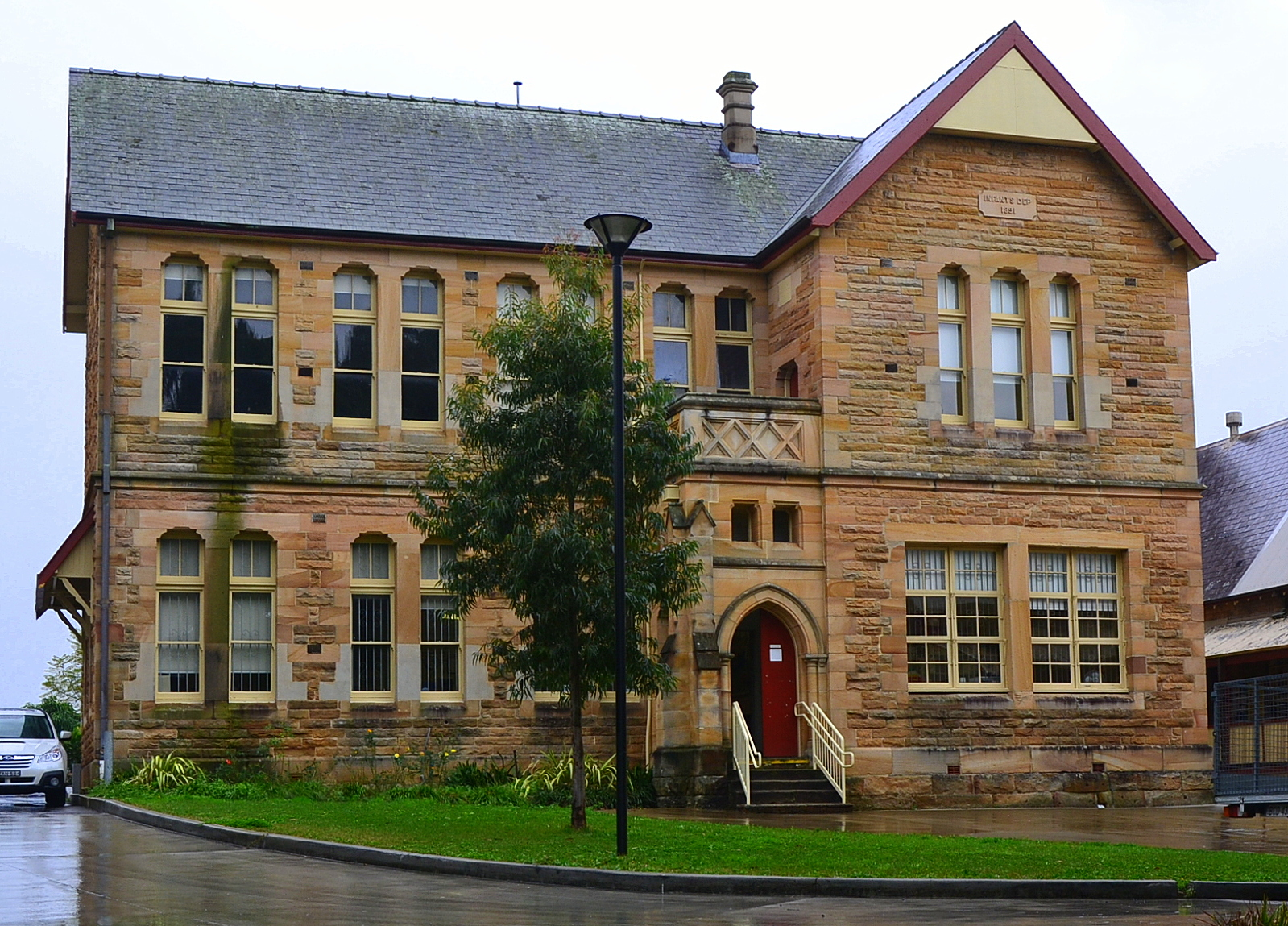
Ryde Public School, Tucker Street

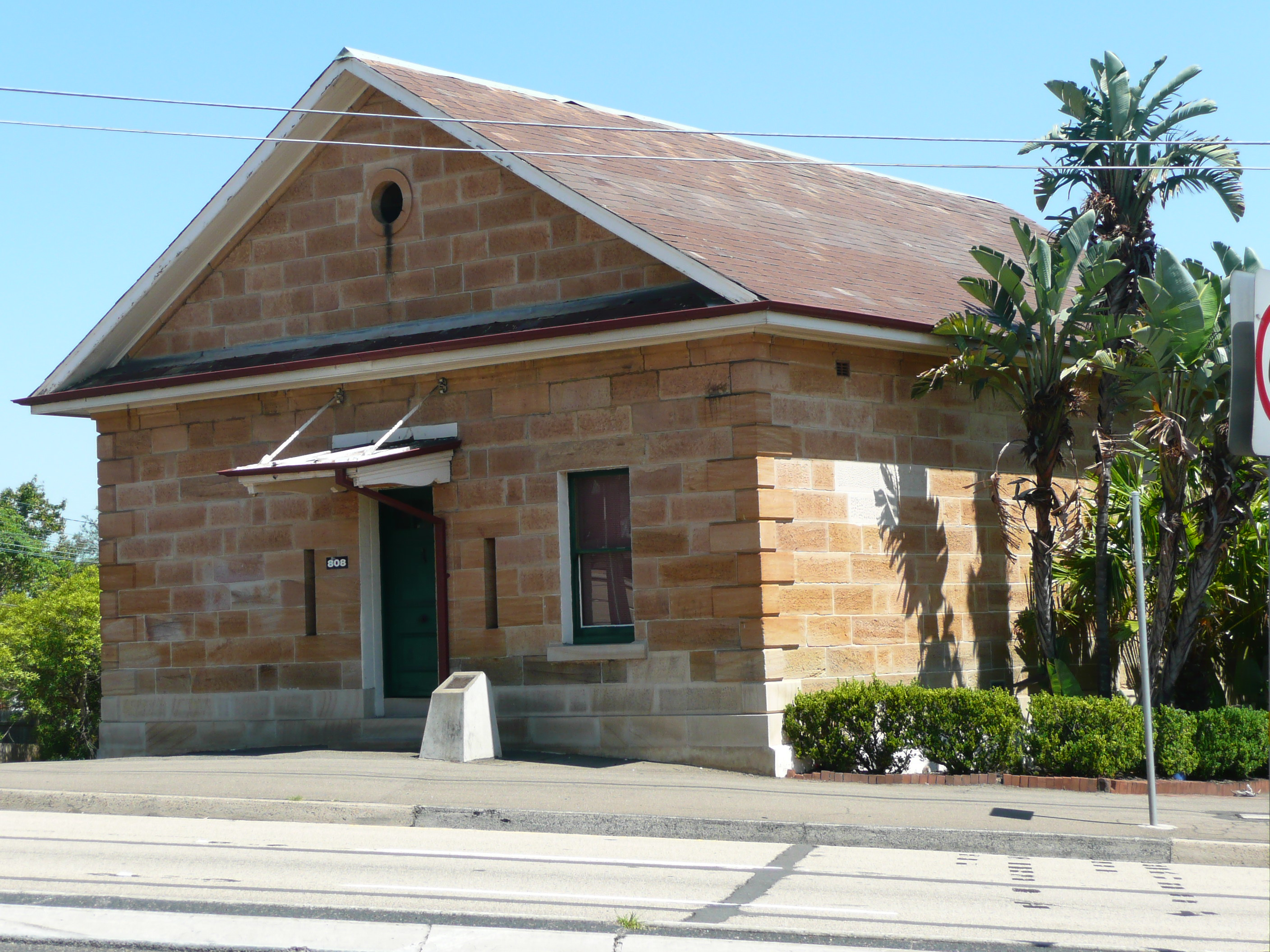
Ryde police station, designed by Mortimer Lewis, located on Victoria Road

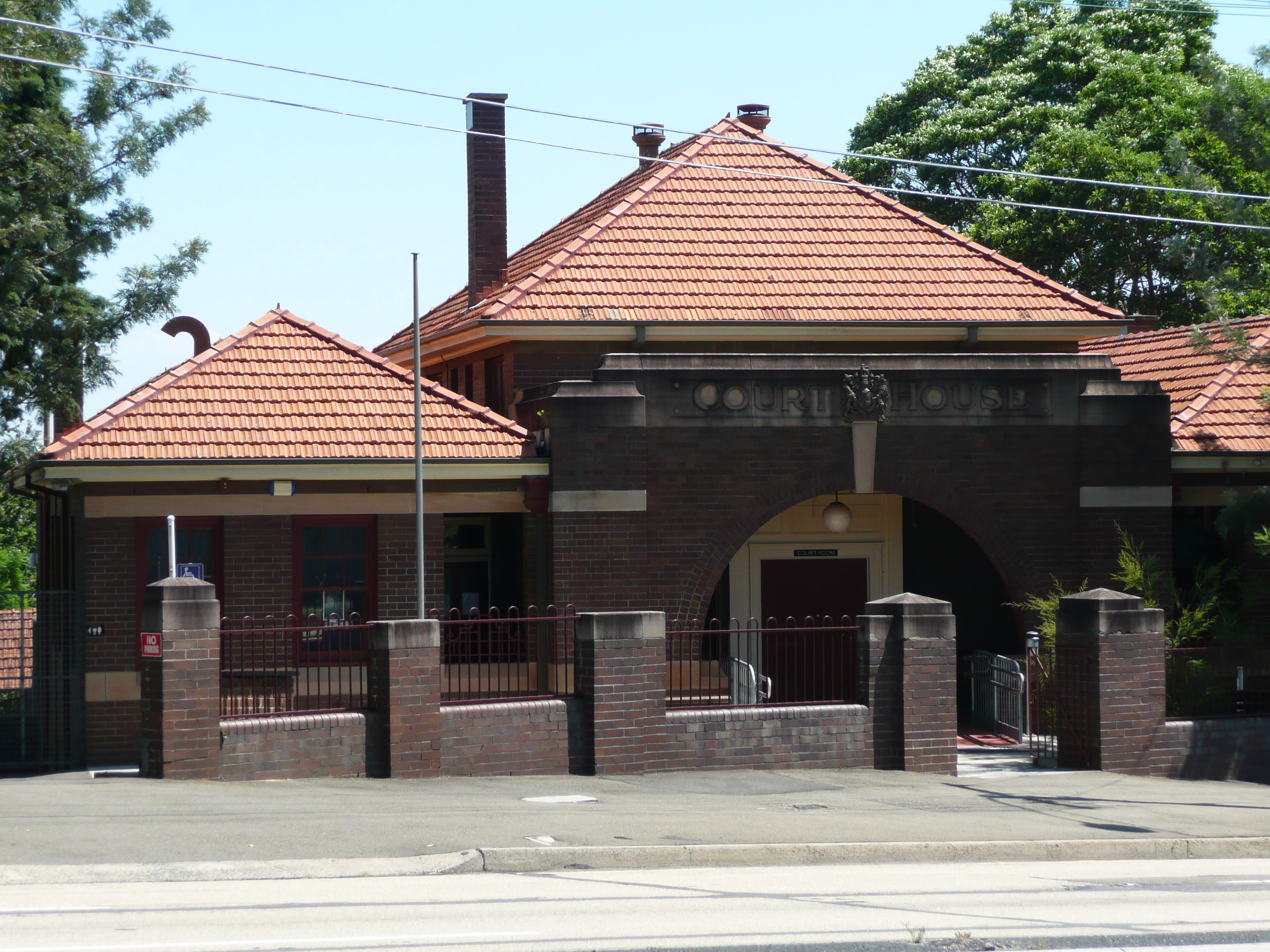
Court House, Victoria Road

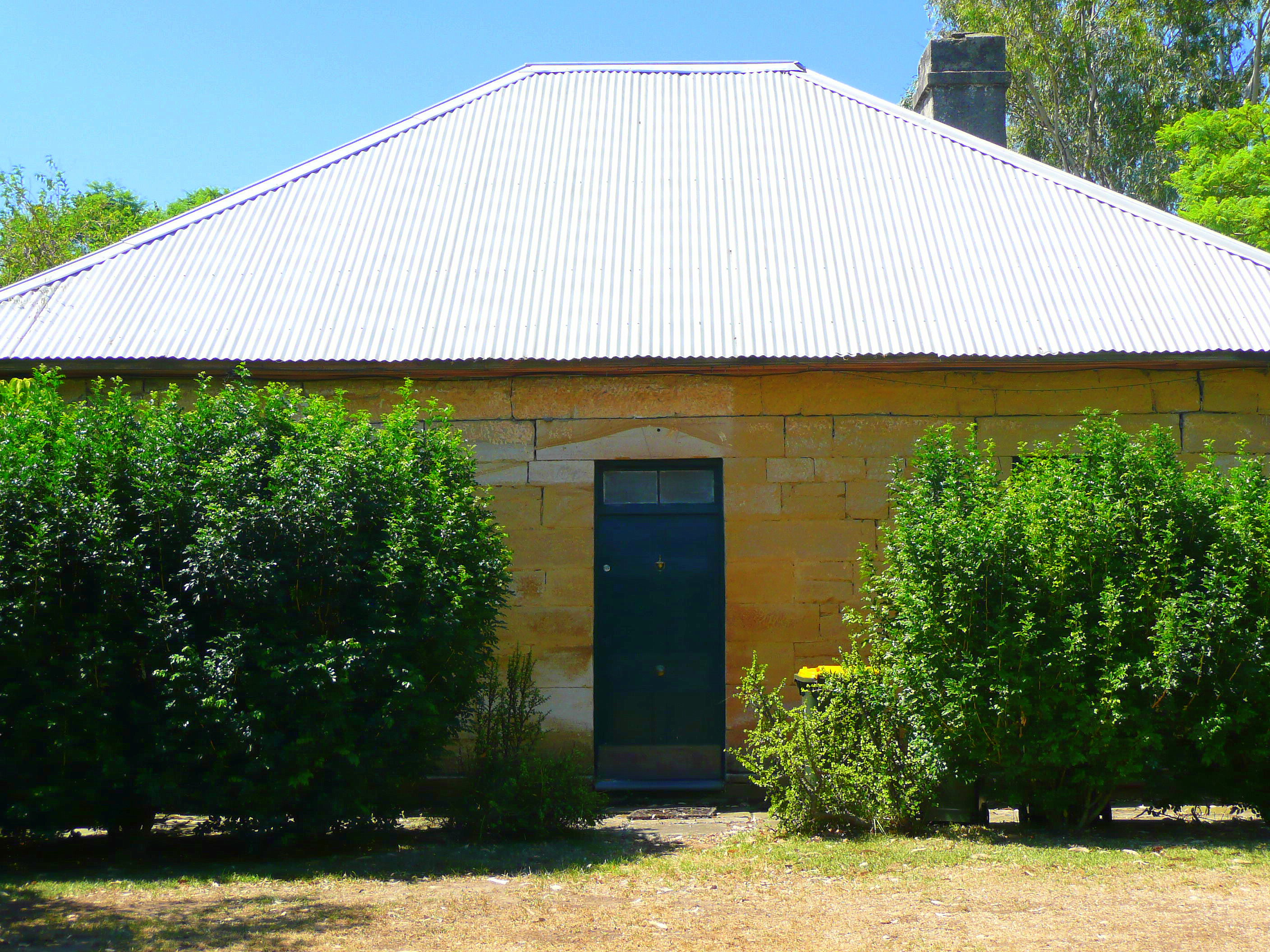
Addington House, c. 1800, Victoria Road

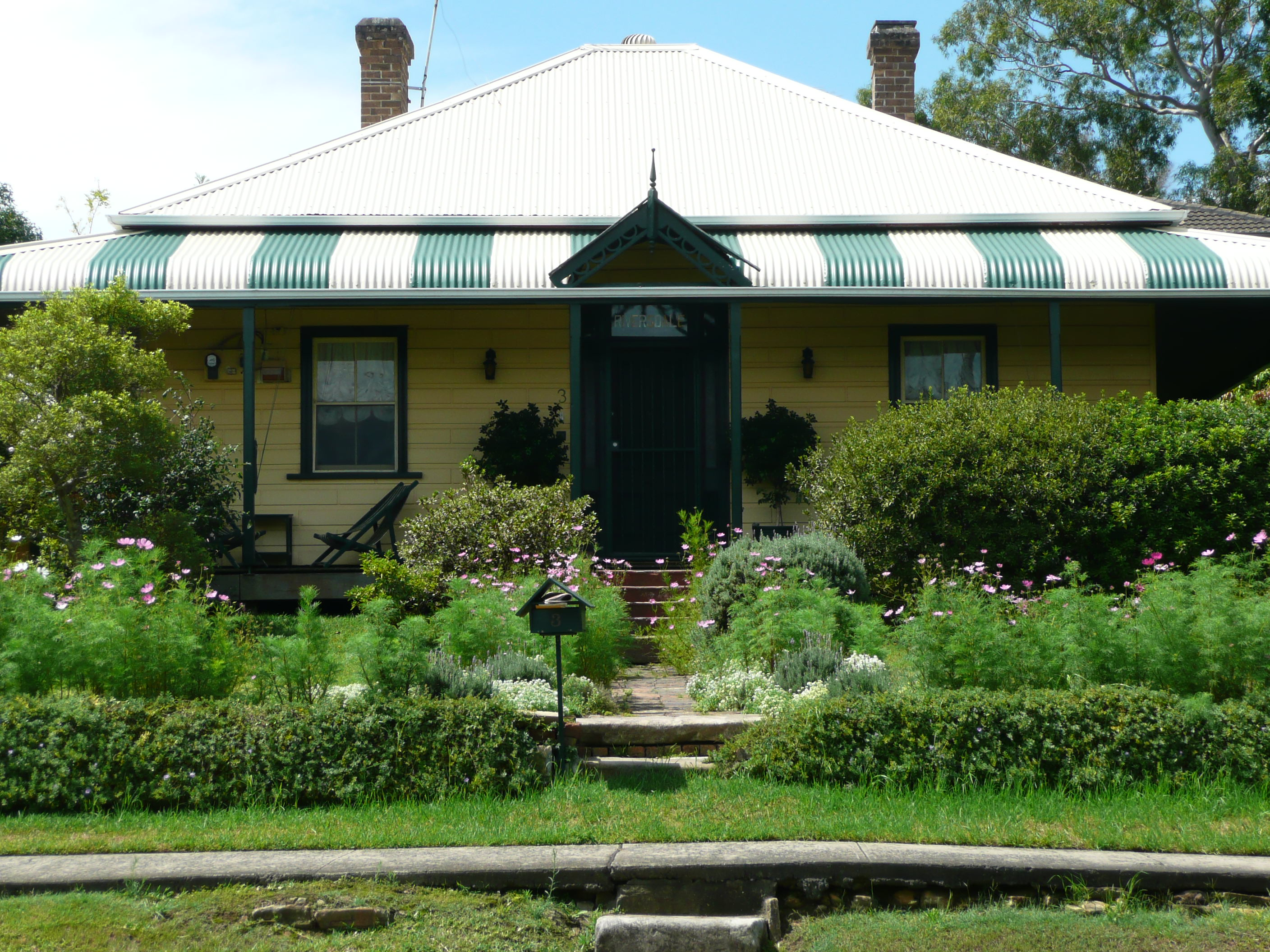
Riversdale, the former home of a Ryde riverboat captain
