= Kissing Point =

Coordinates: 33°49′50″S 151°06′05″E

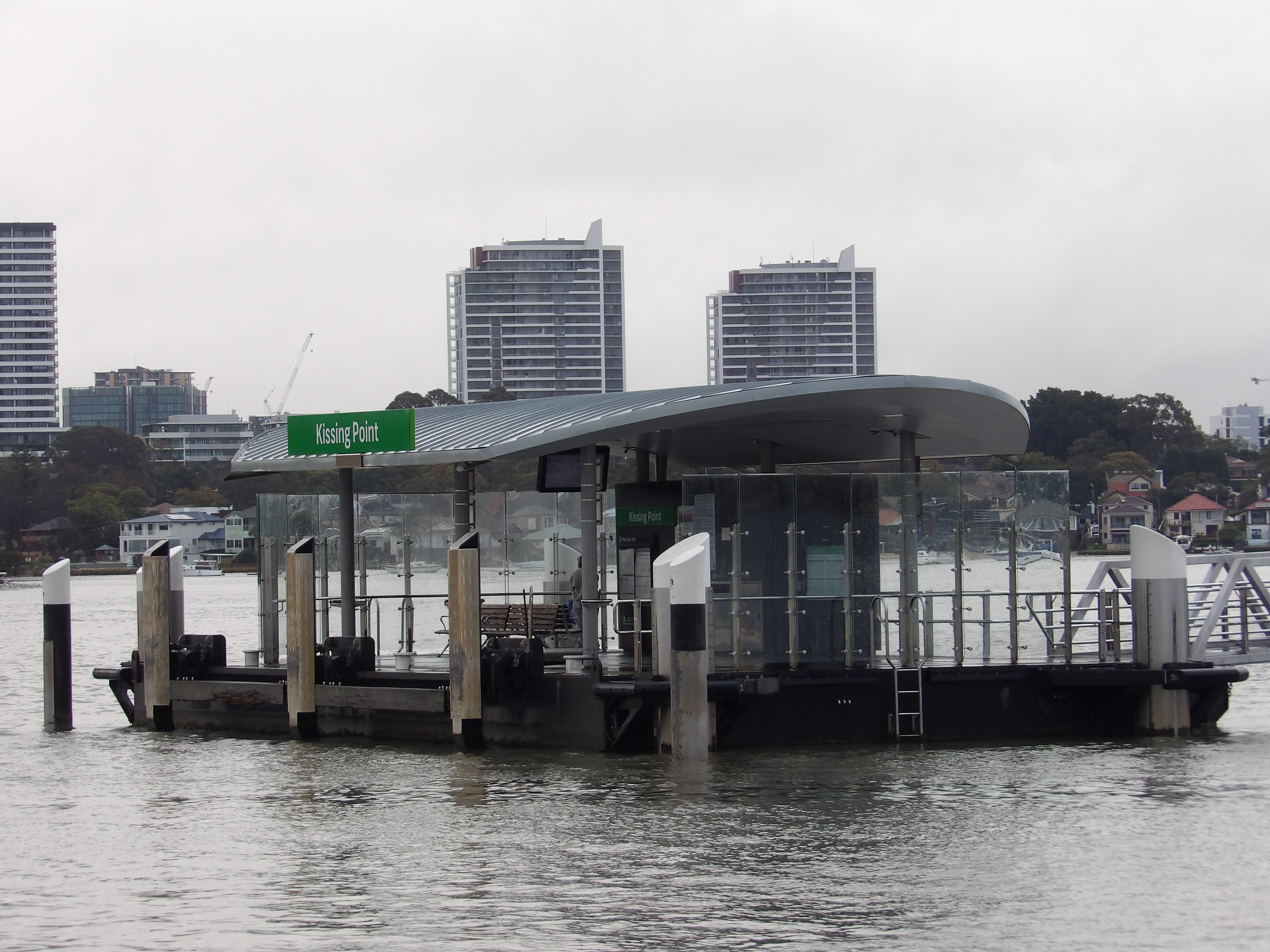
Kissing Point ferry wharf at Putney

Kissing Point is a point on the Parramatta River about 2 km south of Ryde, located in the suburb of Putney. Historically, the name referred to a much wider area than the current-day point; and perhaps originally to the point near Ryde Bridge where Settlers Park is now located.

== History ==
=== Origin of the name ===
Several possibilities have been suggested for the origin of the name "Kissing Point". One is that the name was given because the area of water around it was the furthest up Parramatta River that heavily laden vessels could reach before their keels "kissed" the bottom. Another, more romantic possibility is the area was popular for picnics and that Governor Hunter may have had a kiss in return for his chivalry on one such occasion. A third is that Governor Hunter rowed up the river on a journey of exploration, had breakfast at Breakfast Point, and rowed across the river to Kissing Point where he kissed his wife goodbye before proceeding on his journey.

=== Settlement ===
The area was inhabited by the Wallumedegal people prior to European Settlement.

When the area was first settled by European colonists it was known as Eastern Farms. Land grants were made to 10 emancipated convicts in 1792. By 1794 the name had given way to Kissing Point. In the early 19th century the name was applied to an area including the current day Ryde, Putney and Gladesville.

One of the emancipists was James Squire who brewed the colony's first beer and became a wealthy business man. He grew hops in the area and established a brewery and a tavern on the location just west of the current-day Kissing Point. A plaque to James Squire is erected on the site.

Kissing Point was also an important source of fruits and vegetables for the early colony.

Bennelong died in the area. He was buried on the property of James Squire, near to the point.

Kidman and Mayoh's Shipyard established to build freight ships to replace freight fleet post World War I. A disastrous outcome, as the two ships built here were not commissioned, and were burnt and sold for salvage. Halvorsen's ships located where James Squire's original wharf stood. Halvorsen's made ships for World War II.

== Current day ==
Kissing Point is in the Parish of Hunters Hill in the County of Cumberland and is in the suburb of Putney.

Kissing Point is home to two wharfs; one at Bennelong Park and the other constructed off the very tip of the peninsula, the Sydney Ferries Kissing Point Wharf. Sydney Ferries operates a regular service to the Sydney CBD from the Kissing Point Wharf. Sydney Buses service 507 operates nearby; the bus stop closest to the ferry wharf is in Charles Street near Phillip Street.

There is a boat launching ramp adjacent to the Kissing Point Wharf with associated trailer parking. The point is a landmark on the Parramatta Valley Cycleway.
