= Electoral results for the division of Fannie Bay =

This is a list of electoral results for the electoral division of Fannie Bay in Northern Territory elections.

== Members for Fannie Bay ==
Member	Party	Term
Grant Tambling	Country Liberal	1974–1977
Pam O'Neil	Labor	1977–1983
Marshall Perron	Country Liberal	1983–1995
Clare Martin	Labor	1995–2008
Michael Gunner	Labor	2008–2022
Brent Potter	Labor	2022–2024
Laurie Zio	Country Liberal	2024–present

== Election results ==
=== Elections in the 1970s ===
1974 Northern Territory general election: Fannie Bay
Party	Candidate	Votes	%	±%
Country Liberal	Grant Tambling	845	46.5	N/A
Labor	James Bowditch	546	31.6	N/A
Independent	John McCormack; Eleanor Fisher	378	21.9	N/A
Total formal votes		1,684	95.6	N/A
Informal votes		77	4.4	N/A
Turnout		1,761	78.5	N/A
Country Liberal win		(new seat)		

- Preferences were not distributed.
- The number of votes each individual independent received is unknown.

1977 Northern Territory general election: Fannie Bay
Party	Candidate	Votes	%	±%
Labor	Pam O'Neil	752	42.2	+10.6
Country Liberal	Grant Tambling	622	34.9	−11.6
Independent	William Fisher	318	17.8	+17.8
Progress	Edward Osgood	92	5.2	+5.2
Total formal votes		1,784	97.9	N/A
Informal votes		38	2.1	N/A
Turnout		1,822	82.4	N/A
Two-party-preferred result
Labor	Pam O'Neil	912	51.1	N/A
Country Liberal	Grant Tambling	872	48.9	N/A
Labor gain from Country Liberal		Swing		

=== Elections in the 1980s ===
1980 Northern Territory general election: Fannie Bay
Party	Candidate	Votes	%	±%
Labor	Pam O'Neil	896	51.0	+8.8
Country Liberal	Ella Stack	861	49.0	+14.0
Total formal votes		1,757	97.9	N/A
Informal votes		37	2.1	N/A
Turnout		1,794	88.3	N/A
Labor hold		Swing		

1983 Northern Territory general election: Fannie Bay
Party	Candidate	Votes	%	±%
Country Liberal	Marshall Perron	1,321	58.0	+9.0
Labor	Pam O'Neil	874	38.4	−12.6
Independent	Gerald Luck	81	3.6	+3.6
Total formal votes		2,276	98.6	N/A
Informal votes		33	1.4	N/A
Turnout		2,308	88.9	N/A
Two-party-preferred result
Country Liberal	Marshall Perron	1,361	59.8	+10.8
Labor	Pam O'Neil	915	40.2	−10.8
Country Liberal gain from Labor		Swing		

1987 Northern Territory general election: Fannie Bay
Party	Candidate	Votes	%	±%
Country Liberal	Marshall Perron	1,030	47.9	−10.1
Labor	John Waters	614	28.6	−9.8
NT Nationals	Stephen Marshall	334	15.5	+15.5
Independent	Strider	88	4.1	+4.1
Independent	Edward Osgood	84	3.9	+3.9
Total formal votes		2,150	96.7	N/A
Informal votes		73	3.3	N/A
Turnout		2,223	72.7	N/A
Two-party-preferred result
Country Liberal	Marshall Perron	1,362	63.3	+3.5
Labor	John Waters	788	36.7	−3.5
Country Liberal hold		Swing	+3.3	

=== Elections in the 1990s ===
1990 Northern Territory general election: Fannie Bay
Party	Candidate	Votes	%	±%
Country Liberal	Marshall Perron	1,672	58.1	+10.2
Labor	Paul Costigan	772	26.8	−1.8
Greens	Bob Ellis	345	12.0	+12.0
Independent	Strider	88	3.1	−1.0
Total formal votes		2,877	98.4	N/A
Informal votes		47	1.6	N/A
Turnout		2,924	86.5	N/A
Two-party-preferred result
Country Liberal	Marshall Perron	1,727	60.0	−3.6
Labor	Paul Costigan	1,150	40.0	+3.6
Country Liberal hold		Swing	−3.6	

1994 Northern Territory general election: Fannie Bay
Party	Candidate	Votes	%	±%
Country Liberal	Marshall Perron	1,695	57.9	−0.2
Labor	Sue Bradley	1,232	42.1	+15.3
Total formal votes		2,927	96.7	N/A
Informal votes		99	3.3	N/A
Turnout		3,026	87.2	N/A
Country Liberal hold		Swing	−2.1	

1995 Fannie Bay by-election
Party	Candidate	Votes	%	±%
Labor	Clare Martin	1,339	51.3	+9.2
Country Liberal	Margaret Lyons	1,270	48.7	−9.2
Total formal votes		2,609	96.0	N/A
Informal votes		108	4.0	N/A
Turnout		2,717	76.3	N/A
Labor gain from Country Liberal		Swing	9.2	

1997 Northern Territory general election: Fannie Bay
Party	Candidate	Votes	%	±%
Labor	Clare Martin	1,782	53.0	+10.9
Country Liberal	Michael Kilgariff	1,582	47.0	−10.9
Total formal votes		3,364	95.7	N/A
Informal votes		150	4.3	N/A
Turnout		3,514	84.1	N/A
Labor gain from Country Liberal		Swing	+10.9	

=== Elections in the 2000s ===
2001 Northern Territory general election: Fannie Bay
Party	Candidate	Votes	%	±%
Labor	Clare Martin	2,021	58.4	+6.9
Country Liberal	Mary Cunningham	1,286	37.2	−10.7
Socialist Alliance	Peter Johnston	154	4.4	+4.4
Total formal votes		3,461	96.9	N/A
Informal votes		110	3.1	N/A
Turnout		3,571	84.8	N/A
Two-party-preferred result
Labor	Clare Martin	2,113	61.1	+9.2
Country Liberal	Mary Cunningham	1,348	38.9	−9.2
Labor hold		Swing	+9.2	

2005 Northern Territory general election: Fannie Bay
Party	Candidate	Votes	%	±%
Labor	Clare Martin	2,551	65.8	+8.9
Country Liberal	Edward Fry	1,131	29.2	−8.8
Independent	Fiona Clarke	196	5.1	+5.1
Total formal votes		3,878	97.1	N/A
Informal votes		115	2.9	N/A
Turnout		3,993	85.0	N/A
Two-party-preferred result
Labor	Clare Martin	2,661	68.6	+8.8
Country Liberal	Edward Fry	1,217	31.4	−8.8
Labor hold		Swing	+8.8	

2008 Northern Territory general election: Fannie Bay
Party	Candidate	Votes	%	±%
Labor	Michael Gunner	1,878	51.1	−14.6
Country Liberal	Garry Lambert	1,800	48.9	+14.6
Total formal votes		3,678	94.8	N/A
Informal votes		203	5.2	N/A
Turnout		3,881	78.5	N/A
Labor hold		Swing	−14.6	

=== Elections in the 2010s ===
2012 Northern Territory general election: Fannie Bay
Party	Candidate	Votes	%	±%
Labor	Michael Gunner	1,945	48.8	−2.3
Country Liberal	Tony Clementson	1,639	41.1	−7.8
Greens	Ken Bird	403	10.1	+10.1
Total formal votes		3,987	97.3	N/A
Informal votes		109	2.7	N/A
Turnout		4,096	84.0	N/A
Two-party-preferred result
Labor	Michael Gunner	2,263	56.8	+5.7
Country Liberal	Tony Clementson	1,724	43.2	−5.7
Labor hold		Swing	+5.7	

2016 Northern Territory general election: Fannie Bay
Party	Candidate	Votes	%	±%
Labor	Michael Gunner	2,539	59.3	+11.1
Country Liberal	Karen Brown	1,393	32.5	−8.3
1 Territory	Greg Strettles	349	8.2	+8.2
Total formal votes		4,281	97.8	N/A
Informal votes		95	2.2	N/A
Turnout		4,376	78.0	N/A
Two-party-preferred result
Labor	Michael Gunner	2,688	64.2	+7.8
Country Liberal	Karen Brown	1,499	35.8	−7.8
Labor hold		Swing	+7.8	

=== Elections in the 2020s ===
2020 Northern Territory general election: Fannie Bay
Party	Candidate	Votes	%	±%
Labor	Michael Gunner	2,095	48.2	−8.2
Country Liberal	Tracey Hayes	1,510	34.8	+1.0
Greens	Peter Robertson	444	10.2	+10.2
Territory Alliance	Rebecca Jennings	242	5.6	+5.6
Independent	Mark Mackenzie	54	1.2	+1.2
Total formal votes		4,345	98.1	N/A
Informal votes		85	1.9	N/A
Turnout		4,430	80.9	N/A
Two-party-preferred result
Labor	Michael Gunner	2,589	59.6	−2.9
Country Liberal	Tracey Hayes	1,756	40.4	+2.9
Labor hold		Swing	−2.9	

2022 Fannie Bay by-election
Party	Candidate	Votes	%	±%
Country Liberal	Ben Hosking	1,451	41.4	+6.6
Labor	Brent Potter	1,139	32.5	−15.7
Greens	Jonathan Parry	699	19.9	+9.7
Independent	Leah Potter	103	2.9	+2.9
Independent	Raj Samson Rajwin	84	2.4	+2.4
Independent	George Mamouzellos	30	0.9	+0.9
Total formal votes		3,506	97.9	−0.2
Informal votes		76	2.1	+0.2
Turnout		3,582	65.9	−15.1
Two-party-preferred result
Labor	Brent Potter	1,844	52.6	−7.0
Country Liberal	Ben Hosking	1,662	47.4	+7.0
Labor hold		Swing	−7.0	

2024 Northern Territory general election: Fannie Bay
Party	Candidate	Votes	%	±%
Country Liberal	Laurie Zio	1,858	39.9	+6.8
Greens	Suki Dorras-Walker	1,340	28.7	+17.6
Labor	Brent Potter	1,276	27.4	−21.1
Independent	Leonard May	187	4.0	+4.0
Total formal votes		4,661	97.8	N/A
Informal votes		104	2.2	N/A
Turnout		4,765	77.5	N/A
Two-party-preferred result (Note: Estimated two-party-preferred count by Antony Green.)
Labor	Brent Potter	2,442	52.4	−8.5
Country Liberal	Laurie Zio	2,219	47.6	+8.5
Two-candidate-preferred result
Country Liberal	Laurie Zio	2,349	50.4	+11.3
Greens	Suki Dorras-Walker	2,312	49.6	+49.6
Country Liberal gain from Labor		Swing	N/A	
