= Electoral results for the Division of Bennelong =

Australian division election results

This is a list of electoral results for the Division of Bennelong in Australian federal elections from the electorate's creation in 1949 until the present.

== Members ==
Member	Party	Term
John Cramer	Liberal	1949–1974
John Howard	Liberal	1974–2007
Maxine McKew	Labor	2007–2010
John Alexander	Liberal	2010–2022
Jerome Laxale	Labor	2022–present

== Election results ==
=== Elections in the 2020s ===
==== 2025 ====
2025 Australian federal election: Bennelong
Party	Candidate	Votes	%	±%
Liberal	Scott Yung			
HEART	Barry Devine			
Trumpet of Patriots	Robert Nalbandian			
Labor	Jerome Laxale			
Greens	Adam Hart			
Family First	Eric Chan			
One Nation	Craig Bennett			
Fusion	John August			
Total formal votes				
Informal votes				
Turnout				

==== 2022 ====
2022 Australian federal election: Bennelong
Party	Candidate	Votes	%	±%
Liberal	Simon Kennedy	41,206	41.35	−9.47
Labor	Jerome Laxale	37,596	37.73	+3.70
Greens	Tony Adams	11,395	11.44	+1.97
United Australia	Rhys Collyer	2,915	2.93	+0.97
Fusion	John August	2,125	2.13	+2.13
One Nation	Victor Waterson	1,664	1.67	+1.67
Liberal Democrats	Dougal Cameron	1,539	1.54	+1.54
Democratic Alliance	Kyinzom Dhongdue	1,208	1.21	+1.21
Total formal votes		99,648	94.20	−0.64
Informal votes		6,130	5.80	+0.64
Turnout		105,778	92.03	−1.29
Two-party-preferred result
Labor	Jerome Laxale	50,801	50.98	+7.89
Liberal	Simon Kennedy	48,847	49.02	−7.89
Labor gain from Liberal		Swing	+7.89	

Alluvial diagram for preference flows in the seat of Bennelong in the 2022 federal election. indicates at what stage the winning candidate had over 50% of the votes and was declared the winner.

=== Elections in the 2010s ===
==== 2019 ====
2019 Australian federal election: Bennelong
Party	Candidate	Votes	%	±%
Liberal	John Alexander	48,942	50.82	+0.41
Labor	Brian Owler	32,769	34.03	+5.55
Greens	Qiu Yue Zhang	9,116	9.47	+0.34
Christian Democrats	Julie Worsley	3,588	3.73	−2.67
United Australia	Andrew Marks	1,890	1.96	+1.96
Total formal votes		96,305	94.84	−0.07
Informal votes		5,237	5.16	+0.07
Turnout		101,542	93.32	+1.61
Two-party-preferred result
Liberal	John Alexander	54,809	56.91	−2.81
Labor	Brian Owler	41,496	43.09	+2.81
Liberal hold		Swing	−2.81	

==== 2017 ====
2017 Bennelong by-election
Party	Candidate	Votes	%	±%
Liberal	John Alexander	37,898	45.04	−5.37
Labor	Kristina Keneally	30,085	35.75	+7.27
Greens	Justin Alick	5,688	6.76	−2.37
Conservatives	Joram Richa	3,609	4.29	+4.29
Christian Democrats	Gui Dong Cao	2,626	3.12	−3.28
Science	James Jansson	1,041	1.24	+1.24
Sustainable Australia	Wesley Folitarik	995	1.18	+1.18
Affordable Housing	Anthony Ziebell	742	0.88	+0.88
Liberty Alliance	Tony Robinson	719	0.85	+0.85
Progressives	Chris Golding	426	0.51	+0.51
People's Party	James Platter	186	0.22	+0.22
Non-Custodial Parents	Anthony Fels	132	0.16	+0.16
Total formal votes		84,145	91.88	−3.03
Informal votes		7,436	8.12	+3.03
Turnout		91,581	85.96	−5.74
Two-party-preferred result
Liberal	John Alexander	46,179	54.88	−4.84
Labor	Kristina Keneally	37,966	45.12	+4.84
Liberal hold		Swing	−4.84	

The Liberal primary vote was the lowest on record in Bennelong's 68-year history, including the 2007 Bennelong outcome which was the only election in which the Liberals failed to win Bennelong.

==== 2016 ====
2016 Australian federal election: Bennelong
Party	Candidate	Votes	%	±%
Liberal	John Alexander	46,497	50.41	−2.58
Labor	Lyndal Howison	26,270	28.48	−3.97
Greens	Justin Alick	8,424	9.13	+0.71
Christian Democrats	Julie Worsley	5,903	6.40	+3.99
Independent	Martin Mulcare	2,885	3.13	+3.13
Pirate	John August	1,260	1.37	+1.37
Arts	Christopher Gordon	992	1.08	+1.08
Total formal votes		92,231	94.91	+2.43
Informal votes		4,942	5.09	−2.43
Turnout		97,173	91.71	−3.39
Two-party-preferred result
Liberal	John Alexander	55,077	59.72	+1.95
Labor	Lyndal Howison	37,154	40.28	−1.95
Liberal hold		Swing	+1.95	

==== 2013 ====
2013 Australian federal election: Bennelong
Party	Candidate	Votes	%	±%
Liberal	John Alexander	46,907	52.99	+4.46
Labor	Jason Yat-Sen Li	28,726	32.45	−4.67
Greens	Lindsay Peters	7,454	8.42	+0.47
Christian Democrats	Julie Worsley	2,135	2.41	+0.28
Palmer United	Robert Marks	1,589	1.80	+1.80
Democratic Labour	Lachlan McCaffrey	617	0.70	+0.70
Secular	John August	602	0.68	+0.68
Australia First	Victor Waterson	492	0.56	+0.56
Total formal votes		88,522	92.48	−0.15
Informal votes		7,200	7.52	+0.15
Turnout		95,722	93.35	−0.17
Two-party-preferred result
Liberal	John Alexander	51,139	57.77	+4.65
Labor	Jason Yat-Sen Li	37,383	42.23	−4.65
Liberal hold		Swing	+4.65	

==== 2010 ====
2010 Australian federal election: Bennelong
Party	Candidate	Votes	%	±%
Liberal	John Alexander	41,582	48.53	+3.04
Labor	Maxine McKew	31,803	37.12	−8.21
Greens	Lindsay Peters	6,808	7.95	+2.42
Christian Democrats	Julie Worsley	1,824	2.13	+0.84
Sex Party	Sue Raye	1,105	1.29	+1.29
One Nation	Victor Waterson	725	0.85	+0.55
Family First	Stephen Chavura	570	0.67	+0.34
Carers Alliance	Mary Mockler	478	0.56	+0.56
Liberal Democrats	Terje Petersen	344	0.40	+0.30
Climate Sceptics	Bill Pounder	275	0.32	+0.32
Building Australia	Martin Levine	170	0.20	+0.20
Total formal votes		85,684	92.63	−1.15
Informal votes		6,820	7.37	+1.15
Turnout		92,504	93.53	−1.47
Two-party-preferred result
Liberal	John Alexander	45,518	53.12	+4.52
Labor	Maxine McKew	40,166	46.88	−4.52
Liberal gain from Labor		Swing	+4.52	

=== Elections in the 2000s ===
==== 2007 ====
2007 Australian federal election: Bennelong
Party	Candidate	Votes	%	±%
Liberal	John Howard	39,551	45.49	−4.14
Labor	Maxine McKew	39,408	45.33	+16.18
Greens	Lindsay Peters	4,811	5.53	−10.08
Christian Democrats	Robyn Peebles	1,119	1.29	−1.06
Democrats	Peter Goldfinch	610	0.70	−0.56
Family First	Lorraine Markwell	289	0.33	+0.24
Climate Change	Margherita Tracanelli	269	0.31	+0.31
One Nation	Victor Waterson	261	0.30	+0.23
Independent	Graeme Cordiner	239	0.27	+0.27
Independent	David Allen	123	0.14	+0.14
	Yusuf Tahir	97	0.11	+0.11
Liberty & Democracy	David Leyonhjelm	89	0.10	+0.10
Citizens Electoral Council	Gavin Spencer	70	0.08	+0.08
Total formal votes		86,936	93.78	−0.24
Informal votes		5,764	6.22	+0.24
Turnout		92,700	95.01	+0.02
Two-party-preferred result
Labor	Maxine McKew	44,685	51.40	+5.53
Liberal	John Howard	42,251	48.60	−5.53
Labor gain from Liberal		Swing	+5.53	

==== 2004 ====
2004 Australian federal election: Bennelong
Party	Candidate	Votes	%	±%
Liberal	John Howard	38,326	49.89	−3.18
Labor	Nicole Campbell	21,819	28.40	−2.54
Greens	Andrew Wilkie	12,573	16.37	+12.34
Christian Democrats	Ray Levick	1,824	2.37	+2.37
Democrats	Peter Goldfinch	967	1.26	−4.42
Independent	Gary Hannah	854	1.11	+1.11
Independent	Troy Rollo	451	0.59	+0.59
Total formal votes		76,814	94.16	−0.42
Informal votes		4,762	5.84	+0.42
Turnout		81,576	94.61	+0.02
Two-party-preferred result
Liberal	John Howard	41,735	54.33	−3.38
Labor	Nicole Campbell	35,079	45.67	+3.38
Liberal hold		Swing	−3.38	

==== 2001 ====
2001 Australian federal election: Bennelong
Party	Candidate	Votes	%	±%
Liberal	John Howard	41,255	53.07	+4.30
Labor	Nicole Campbell	24,053	30.94	−1.42
Democrats	Peter Goldfinch	4,415	5.68	+0.98
Greens	Jimmy Shaw	3,133	4.03	+1.05
One Nation	Robert Webeck	2,126	2.73	−1.56
Independent	May Law	1,474	1.90	+1.90
No GST	Bruce Harkness	535	0.69	+0.47
Independent	John Dawson	458	0.59	+0.38
Save the ADI Site	Noel Plumb	205	0.26	+0.26
Non-Custodial Parents	Peter Marsh	84	0.11	+0.11
Total formal votes		77,738	94.58	+0.02
Informal votes		4,457	5.42	−0.02
Turnout		82,195	94.84	
Two-party-preferred result
Liberal	John Howard	44,861	57.70	+2.47
Labor	Nicole Campbell	32,877	42.30	−2.47
Liberal hold		Swing	+2.47	

=== Elections in the 1990s ===
==== 1998 ====
1998 Australian federal election: Bennelong
Party	Candidate	Votes	%	±%
Liberal	John Howard	36,976	49.24	−4.59
Labor	Wendy Mahon	23,929	31.87	−0.29
Democrats	Bob Springett	3,504	4.67	−1.57
One Nation	Gordon King	3,099	4.13	+4.13
Unity	Sarah Kemp	2,923	3.89	+3.89
Greens	Jamie Parker	2,306	3.07	+0.60
Independent	David Lung	1,319	1.76	+1.76
No Aircraft Noise	William Gollam	341	0.45	−1.28
Independent	John Dawson	186	0.25	−0.03
Abolish Child Support	Prime Minister John Piss the Family Court and Legal Aid	183	0.24	+0.24
Independent	Julien Paul Droulers	128	0.17	−0.08
Natural Law	Tim Carr	123	0.16	−0.14
Independent	Marcus Aussie-Stone	71	0.09	+0.09
Total formal votes		75,088	94.33	−1.85
Informal votes		4,513	5.67	+1.85
Turnout		79,601	95.07	−1.67
Two-party-preferred result
Liberal	John Howard	42,075	56.03	−4.10
Labor	Wendy Mahon	33,013	43.97	+4.10
Liberal hold		Swing	−4.10	

==== 1996 ====
1996 Australian federal election: Bennelong
Party	Candidate	Votes	%	±%
Liberal	John Howard	40,589	53.83	+3.71
Labor	Wendy Mahon	24,248	32.16	−9.49
Democrats	Suzanne Reddy	4,700	6.23	+0.95
Against Further Immigration	Paul Kemp	1,968	2.61	+2.61
Greens	Jamie Parker	1,861	2.47	+2.47
No Aircraft Noise	Robert Shaw	1,305	1.73	+1.73
Natural Law	Tim Carr	227	0.30	−0.23
Independent	John Dawson	208	0.28	−1.38
Independent	Julien Paul Droulers	187	0.25	+0.25
Independent	James Bernard	111	0.15	+0.15
Total formal votes		75,404	96.18	−1.04
Informal votes		2,994	3.82	+1.04
Turnout		78,398	96.75	+0.42
Two-party-preferred result
Liberal	John Howard	45,128	60.13	+6.95
Labor	Wendy Mahon	29,918	39.87	−6.95
Liberal hold		Swing	+6.95	

==== 1993 ====
1993 Australian federal election: Bennelong
Party	Candidate	Votes	%	±%
Liberal	John Howard	37,096	50.12	+1.25
Labor	Monique Rotik	30,826	41.65	+9.28
Democrats	Suzanne Reddy	3,910	5.28	−4.98
Independent	John Dawson	1,222	1.65	+1.25
	Geoff Dalgliesh	570	0.77	+0.77
Natural Law	Michael Roylance	393	0.53	+0.53
Total formal votes		74,017	97.22	+0.32
Informal votes		2,118	2.78	−0.32
Turnout		76,135	96.33	
Two-party-preferred result
Liberal	John Howard	39,341	53.19	−3.96
Labor	Monique Rotik	34,629	46.81	+3.96
Liberal hold		Swing	−3.96	

==== 1990 ====
1990 Australian federal election: Bennelong
Party	Candidate	Votes	%	±%
Liberal	John Howard	33,862	52.8	−4.1
Labor	Martin Claridge	18,363	28.6	−5.2
Democrats	Bob Springett	5,827	9.1	+1.9
Independent	Judy Messer	3,381	5.3	+5.3
Nuclear Disarmament	Hugh Pitty	1,399	2.2	+2.2
Call to Australia	Robyn Peebles	893	1.4	+1.4
Independent	John Dawson	372	0.6	−0.3
Total formal votes		64,097	97.0	
Informal votes		1,962	3.0	
Turnout		66,059	95.5	
Two-party-preferred result
Liberal	John Howard	38,574	60.3	−0.3
Labor	Martin Claridge	25,363	39.7	+0.3
Liberal hold		Swing	−0.3	

=== Elections in the 1980s ===
==== 1987 ====
1987 Australian federal election: Bennelong
Party	Candidate	Votes	%	±%
Liberal	John Howard	36,266	56.9	+2.7
Labor	Beverley Sharpe	21,533	33.8	−3.4
Democrats	Paul Taylor	4,603	7.2	−1.4
Independent	Stephen Davidson	710	1.1	+1.1
Independent	John Dawson	573	0.9	+0.9
Total formal votes		63,685	96.5	
Informal votes		2,309	3.5	
Turnout		65,994	94.1	
Two-party-preferred result
Liberal	John Howard	38,601	60.6	+2.1
Labor	Beverley Sharpe	25,080	39.4	−2.1
Liberal hold		Swing	+2.1	

==== 1984 ====
1984 Australian federal election: Bennelong
Party	Candidate	Votes	%	±%
Liberal	John Howard	33,820	54.2	+6.8
Labor	Margaret Duckett	23,251	37.2	−1.2
Democrats	Steve Gabell	5,377	8.6	+8.6
Total formal votes		62,448	94.7	
Informal votes		3,470	5.3	
Turnout		65,918	94.7	
Two-party-preferred result
Liberal	John Howard	36,528	58.5	+4.7
Labor	Margaret Duckett	25,916	41.5	−4.7
Liberal hold		Swing	+4.7	

==== 1983 ====
1983 Australian federal election: Bennelong
Party	Candidate	Votes	%	±%
Liberal	John Howard	33,721	50.3	−3.6
Labor	Donald Vickers	23,799	35.5	−0.7
South West Coalition	Milo Dunphy	8,495	12.7	+12.7
Independent	Steve Gabell	1,000	1.5	+1.5
Total formal votes		67,015	98.1	
Informal votes		1,297	1.9	
Turnout		68,312	95.9	
Two-party-preferred result
Liberal	John Howard	37,330	55.70	−2.70
Labor	Donald Vickers	29,685	44.30	+2.70
Liberal hold		Swing	−2.70	

==== 1980 ====
1980 Australian federal election: Bennelong
Party	Candidate	Votes	%	±%
Liberal	John Howard	36,075	53.9	−2.3
Labor	John Guthrie	24,262	36.3	+6.3
Democrats	Pamela Tuckwell	4,724	7.1	−5.9
Progress	James Darby	1,856	2.8	+2.0
Total formal votes		66,917	98.1	
Informal votes		1,292	1.9	
Turnout		68,209	94.5	
Two-party-preferred result
Liberal	John Howard		58.4	−5.0
Labor	John Guthrie		41.6	+5.0
Liberal hold		Swing	−5.0	

=== Elections in the 1970s ===
==== 1977 ====
1977 Australian federal election: Bennelong
Party	Candidate	Votes	%	±%
Liberal	John Howard	37,080	56.2	−1.1
Labor	Noel Welsman	19,794	30.0	−8.6
Democrats	Bruce Irwin	8,544	13.0	+13.0
Progress	David Rennie	556	0.8	+0.8
Total formal votes		65,974	98.2	
Informal votes		1,215	1.8	
Turnout		67,189	95.7	
Two-party-preferred result
Liberal	John Howard		63.4	+3.8
Labor	Noel Welsman		36.6	−3.8
Liberal hold		Swing	+3.8	

==== 1975 ====
1975 Australian federal election: Bennelong
Party	Candidate	Votes	%	±%
Liberal	John Howard	39,867	60.5	+8.8
Labor	Noel Welsman	23,319	35.4	−6.6
Australia	Brian Johnson	1,527	2.3	−1.9
Independent	John Anlezark	1,195	1.8	−0.3
Total formal votes		65,908	98.4	
Informal votes		1,094	1.6	
Turnout		67,002	95.4	
Two-party-preferred result
Liberal	John Howard		62.8	+8.3
Labor	Noel Welsman		37.2	−8.3
Liberal hold		Swing	+8.3	

==== 1974 ====
1974 Australian federal election: Bennelong
Party	Candidate	Votes	%	±%
Liberal	John Howard	32,700	51.7	+5.7
Labor	Dick Hall	26,581	42.0	+3.8
Australia	Gillian Sutton	2,649	4.2	−6.3
Independent	John Anlezark	1,311	2.1	+2.1
Total formal votes		63,241	98.2	
Informal votes		1,132	1.8	
Turnout		64,373	95.0	
Two-party-preferred result
Liberal	John Howard		54.5	+2.1
Labor	Dick Hall		45.5	−2.1
Liberal hold		Swing	+2.1	

==== 1972 ====
1972 Australian federal election: Bennelong
Party	Candidate	Votes	%	±%
Liberal	Sir John Cramer	27,113	46.0	−2.6
Labor	Norman Russell	22,534	38.2	+1.5
Australia	Claudia Leach	6,212	10.5	+4.8
Democratic Labor	Gwen Fitzpatrick	2,040	3.5	−1.0
Defence of Government Schools	Jean Sulima	1,061	1.8	+1.8
Total formal votes		58,960	98.4	
Informal votes		977	1.6	
Turnout		59,937	94.7	
Two-party-preferred result
Liberal	Sir John Cramer	30,879	52.4	−4.4
Labor	Norman Russell	28,081	47.6	+4.4
Liberal hold		Swing	−4.4	

=== Elections in the 1960s ===
==== 1969 ====
1969 Australian federal election: Bennelong
Party	Candidate	Votes	%	±%
Liberal	Sir John Cramer	26,974	48.6	−13.5
Labor	Peter Evatt	20,402	36.7	+11.1
Australia	Kenneth Cook	3,144	5.7	+5.7
Democratic Labor	Ronald Claridge	2,524	4.5	−0.6
Independent	Allan Horton	2,495	4.5	+4.5
Total formal votes		55,539	97.7	
Informal votes		1,291	2.3	
Turnout		56,830	94.6	
Two-party-preferred result
Liberal	Sir John Cramer		56.8	−11.4
Labor	Peter Evatt		43.2	+11.4
Liberal hold		Swing	−11.4	

==== 1966 ====
1966 Australian federal election: Bennelong
Party	Candidate	Votes	%	±%
Liberal	Sir John Cramer	31,239	59.3	+1.8
Labor	Geoffrey O'Donnell	14,987	28.4	−8.9
Liberal Reform Group	Robert Turner	3,808	7.2	+7.2
Democratic Labor	Edward Connolly	2,672	5.1	+0.5
Total formal votes		52,706	97.2	
Informal votes		1,525	2.8	
Turnout		54,231	94.6	
Two-party-preferred result
Liberal	Sir John Cramer		65.4	+3.9
Labor	Geoffrey O'Donnell		34.6	−3.9
Liberal hold		Swing	+3.9	

==== 1963 ====
1963 Australian federal election: Bennelong
Party	Candidate	Votes	%	±%
Liberal	John Cramer	29,947	57.5	+12.1
Labor	William Baird	19,462	37.3	−10.8
Democratic Labor	Allan Dwyer	2,422	4.6	−1.9
New Guinea	Joseph Woodhouse	296	0.6	+0.6
Total formal votes		52,127	98.5	
Informal votes		792	1.5	
Turnout		52,919	95.5	
Two-party-preferred result
Liberal	John Cramer		61.5	+10.7
Labor	William Baird		38.5	−10.7
Liberal hold		Swing	+10.7	

==== 1961 ====
1961 Australian federal election: Bennelong
Party	Candidate	Votes	%	±%
Labor	Harry Jensen	24,389	48.1	+7.5
Liberal	John Cramer	22,991	45.4	−9.3
Democratic Labor	Edward Beck	3,278	6.5	+2.9
Total formal votes		50,658	98.3	
Informal votes		872	1.7	
Turnout		51,530	96.2	
Two-party-preferred result
Liberal	John Cramer	26,745	50.8	−7.4
Labor	Harry Jensen	24,913	49.2	+7.4
Liberal hold		Swing	−7.4	

=== Elections in the 1950s ===
==== 1958 ====
1958 Australian federal election: Bennelong
Party	Candidate	Votes	%	±%
Liberal	John Cramer	25,518	54.7	−6.0
Labor	Harold Coates	18,941	40.6	+1.3
Democratic Labor	Roderick Gray	1,702	3.6	+3.6
Independent	Patrick Rossiter	522	1.1	+1.1
Total formal votes		46,683	97.1	
Informal votes		1,404	2.9	
Turnout		48,087	96.0	
Two-party-preferred result
Liberal	John Cramer		58.2	−2.5
Labor	Harold Coates		41.8	+2.5
Liberal hold		Swing	−2.5	

==== 1955 ====
1955 Australian federal election: Bennelong
Party	Candidate	Votes	%	±%
Liberal	John Cramer	25,628	60.7	+3.8
Labor	Harold Coates	16,607	39.3	−3.8
Total formal votes		42,235	97.3	
Informal votes		1,160	2.7	
Turnout		43,395	95.8	
Liberal hold		Swing	+3.8	

==== 1954 ====
1954 Australian federal election: Bennelong
Party	Candidate	Votes	%	±%
Liberal	John Cramer	24,338	57.1	−3.9
Labor	Thomas Campbell	18,263	42.9	+3.9
Total formal votes		42,601	98.8	
Informal votes		517	1.2	
Turnout		43,118	96.3	
Liberal hold		Swing	−3.9	

==== 1951 ====
1951 Australian federal election: Bennelong
Party	Candidate	Votes	%	±%
Liberal	John Cramer	24,732	61.0	+1.4
Labor	William Fitzgibbon	15,840	39.0	−1.4
Total formal votes		40,572	98.1	
Informal votes		797	1.9	
Turnout		41,369	96.3	
Liberal hold		Swing	+1.4	

=== Elections in the 1940s ===
==== 1949 ====
1949 Australian federal election: Bennelong
Party	Candidate	Votes	%	±%
Liberal	John Cramer	23,568	59.6	+8.2
Labor	Raymond Watt	15,952	40.4	−8.2
Total formal votes		39,520	97.9	
Informal votes		849	2.1	
Turnout		40,369	96.5	
Liberal notional hold		Swing	+8.2	
