= 2022 Fannie Bay by-election =

By-election in Northern Territory, Australia

| ← 2020 | 20 August 2022 | 2024 → |

The division of Fannie Bay in the Northern Territory Legislative Assembly

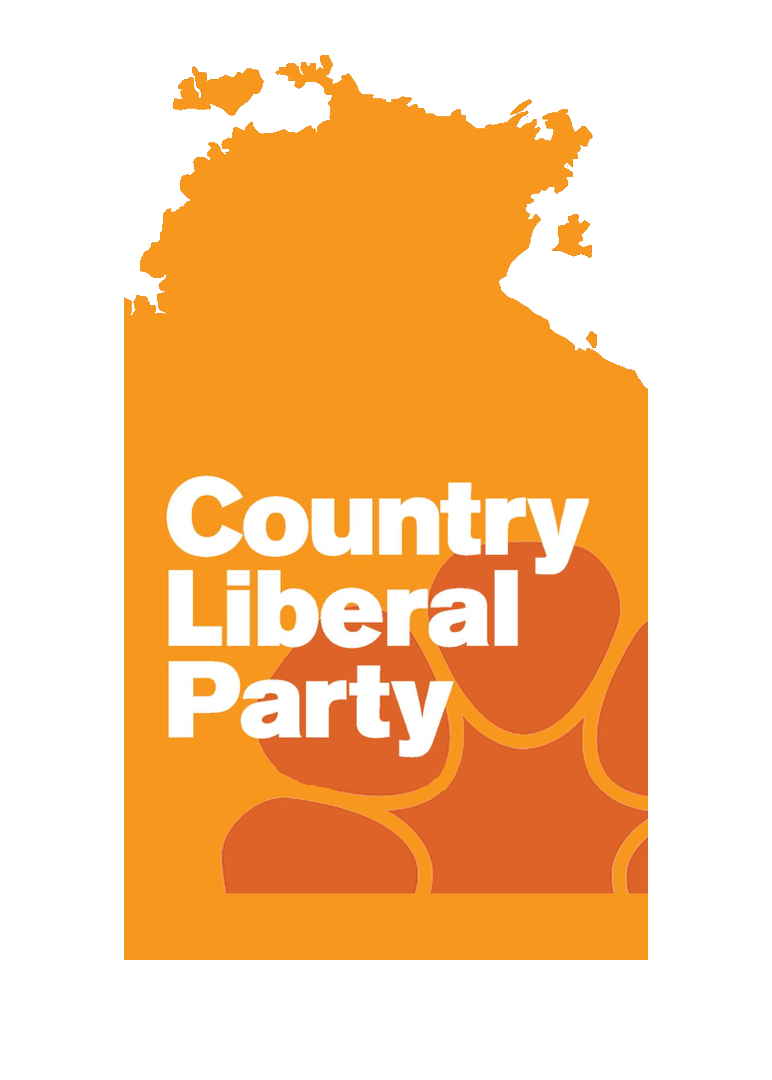

| | First party | Second party | Third party |
|---|---|---|---|
| Candidate | Brent Potter | Ben Hosking | Jonathan Parry |
| Party | Labor | Country Liberal | Greens |
| Popular vote | 1,139 | 1,451 | 699 |
| Percentage | 32.5% | 41.4% | 19.9% |
| Swing | ▼15.7pp | ▲6.6pp | ▲9.7pp |
| TPP | 52.6% | 47.4% |
| TPP swing | ▼7.0pp | ▲7.0pp |
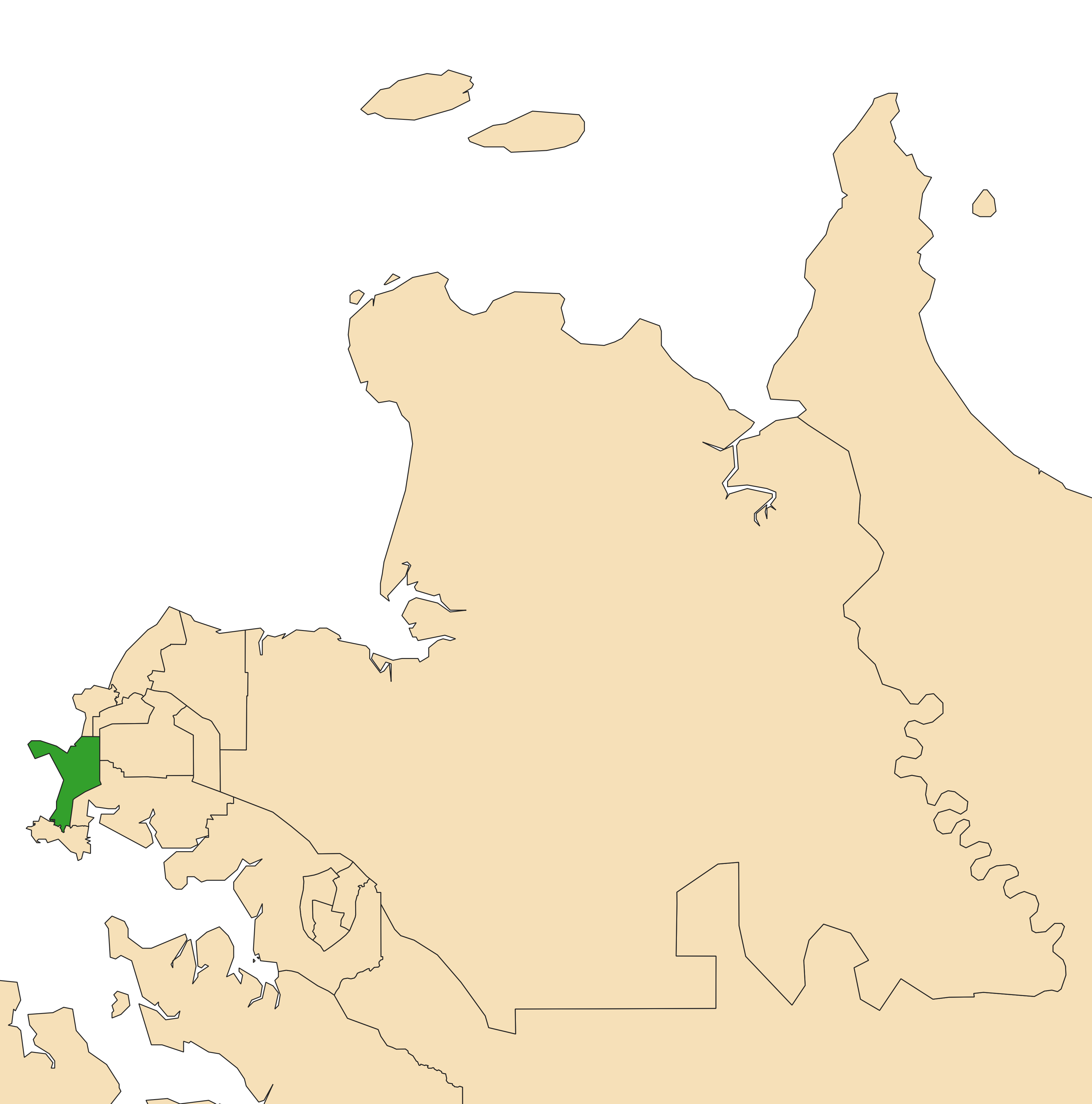
- Map of the electoral division of Fannie Bay in the Darwin/Palmerston area
MLA before election
Michael Gunner
Labor
Elected MLA
Brent Potter
Labor

A by-election in the seat of Fannie Bay in the Northern Territory was held on 20 August 2022, following the resignation of Michael Gunner, the MLA for Fannie Bay and former chief minister, on 27 July 2022. Early voting started on Monday 8 August.

== Candidates ==
Candidates in ballot paper order
| Party | Candidate | Background |
|---|---|---|
| Labor | Brent Potter | Former political staffer and defence force veteran |
| Independent | George Mamouzellos | |
| Independent | Raj Samson Rajwin | |
| Greens | Jonathan Parry | Legal Aid Lawyer |
| Independent | Leah Potter | Founder of the Sunset Soup Kitchen |
| Country Liberal | Ben Hosking | Small business owner and former police officer |

Brent Potter, a senior policy advisor to Chief Minister Natasha Fyles and defence force veteran, contested the by-election for the Labor Party. Potter was reported to have been personally selected as a "captain's pick" by Fyles, and is married to the sister of Gabrielle Mappas, Fyles' chief of staff. Potter has been a resident of the Northern Territory since 2009. Potter currently lives outside of the electorate, in the Palmerston suburb of Bellamack, but has pledged to move to the electorate of Fannie Bay if elected. The length of Potter's employment as an advisor for the chief minister is unclear as Potter's LinkedIn account was deactivated. Screenshots Potter's now deactivated LinkedIn page taken the month before his nomination show he had previously worked for the CEO of an aerospace company, which he had helped secure $10 million in public funds from the government. On 9 August 2022, during a radio interview on Mix 104.9, host Katie Wolf raised allegations of pork barrelling around with a new Parap preschool with Potter, which he had been involved in announcing. Potter responded that the funding for the new primary school was in the government's infrastructure plan and would "be included in next year's budget".

Ben Hosking, a local small business owner and former police officer contested the by-election for the Country Liberal Party. Hosking was born in Darwin and grew up in the electorate of Fannie Bay, living in Ludmilla and attending school in Parap. In 2016, Hosking unsuccessfully contested Drysdale (based in Palmerston) electorate for the CLP. During this election, Hosking courted controversy for releasing a factually inaccurate and misleading advertisement in which he was holding an assault rifle. Hosking also previously attempted to run as a candidate for the federal seat of Solomon but failed to succeed at the pre-selection stage. Shortly after being announced as candidate, Hosking was filmed out the front of Michael Gunner's electoral office, which had recently been vandalised.

Jonathan Parry, a legal aid lawyer, contested the by-election for the Northern Territory Greens. Parry is a resident of the electorate and is the party's national secretary. Jonathan Parry is the only candidate who lives in the electorate, living in and owning a property in Parap.

Leah Potter is the founder of the Sunset Soup Kitchen and contested the election as an independent candidate. She contested the 2020 general election as an independent candidate for the seat of Port Darwin.

== Results ==
2022 Fannie Bay by-election
| Party | Candidate | Votes | % | ±% |
|---|---|---|---|---|
| Country Liberal | Ben Hosking | 1,451 | 41.4 | +6.6 |
| Labor | Brent Potter | 1,139 | 32.5 | −15.7 |
| Greens | Jonathan Parry | 699 | 19.9 | +9.7 |
| Independent | Leah Potter | 103 | 2.9 | +2.9 |
| Independent | Raj Samson Rajwin | 84 | 2.4 | +2.4 |
| Independent | George Mamouzellos | 30 | 0.9 | +0.9 |
| Total formal votes | | 3,506 | 97.9 | −0.2 |
| Informal votes | | 76 | 2.1 | +0.2 |
| Turnout | | 3,582 | 65.9 | −15.1 |
Two-party-preferred result
| Labor | Brent Potter | 1,844 | 52.6 | −7.0 |
| Country Liberal | Ben Hosking | 1,662 | 47.4 | +7.0 |
| Labor hold | | Swing | −7.0 | |

== See also ==
- List of Northern Territory by-elections
- Electoral results for the division of Fannie Bay
