= Matthew Gardiner (trade unionist) =

Australian former trade unionist

Matthew John Gardiner (born 16 May 1971) is an Australian former trade unionist. He was the Secretary of the Northern Territory Branch of United Voice and was also President of the Northern Territory Branch of the Australian Labor Party.

In 2015, he went to Syria to fight against the Islamic State of Iraq and the Levant. He was detained upon his return to Australia but released without charge.

== Career ==
Gardiner served in the Australian Army for around a decade and was deployed to Somalia in 1993 as a combat engineer.

In United Voice, he oversaw the growth of the branch to become the largest union in the Northern Territory. The union in the Northern Territory represents workers with occupations in many varied industries in the Northern Territory including miners, firefighters, prison officers, childcare workers, healthcare workers, cleaners, security guards and workers at Indigenous organisations. The union grew between 5-10% per annum under his term of office and he had been re-elected unopposed to continue his tenure till 2018. He served until January 2015.

Gardiner was President of the NT Branch of the Australian Labor Party. In 2007 he stood for pre-selection for the Federal seat of Solomon only to narrowly lose to Damian Hale, who won the seat in the 2007 election. He was the second endorsed ALP candidate for the senate in the 2010 Federal election, although he didn't win a seat.

Gardiner had been a vocal advocate for Territory issues included the proposed nuclear waste dump, Indigenous jobs, the NT Intervention and remote health. He was a member of the Council of Charles Darwin University from June 2009 to April 2015. He was Branch Secretary of the Northern Territory Branch of the Liquor, Hospitality and Miscellaneous Union from 2007. He was also selected as one of the entrants to the Who's Who in Australia 2010 edition.

In November 2013, he was linked to a plan by the Northern Territory Labor Government and Unions NT to take a lease on the Stella Maris property at Darwin's Waterfront for ten years for no rent. A Parliamentary Inquiry was established on 5 December 2013 into the deal. After his appearance it was found there was no case to answer.

== Fighting in Syria ==
In January 2015, it was reported that Gardiner had traveled to Syria to fight against Islamic State with Kurdish forces of People's Protection Units. He resigned from his role as secretary of United Voice. He was stood down as the head of the Labor Party's NT branch and his membership was suspended.

On 5 April 2015, Gardiner returned to Darwin, and was detained and questioned by the Australian Federal Police. He was released without charge.
