= 2017 Bennelong by-election =

Australian federal by-election

- 16 December 2017

Division of Bennelong (NSW) in the House of Representatives
- Registered: 106,534
- Turnout: 85.96% (▼5.70)
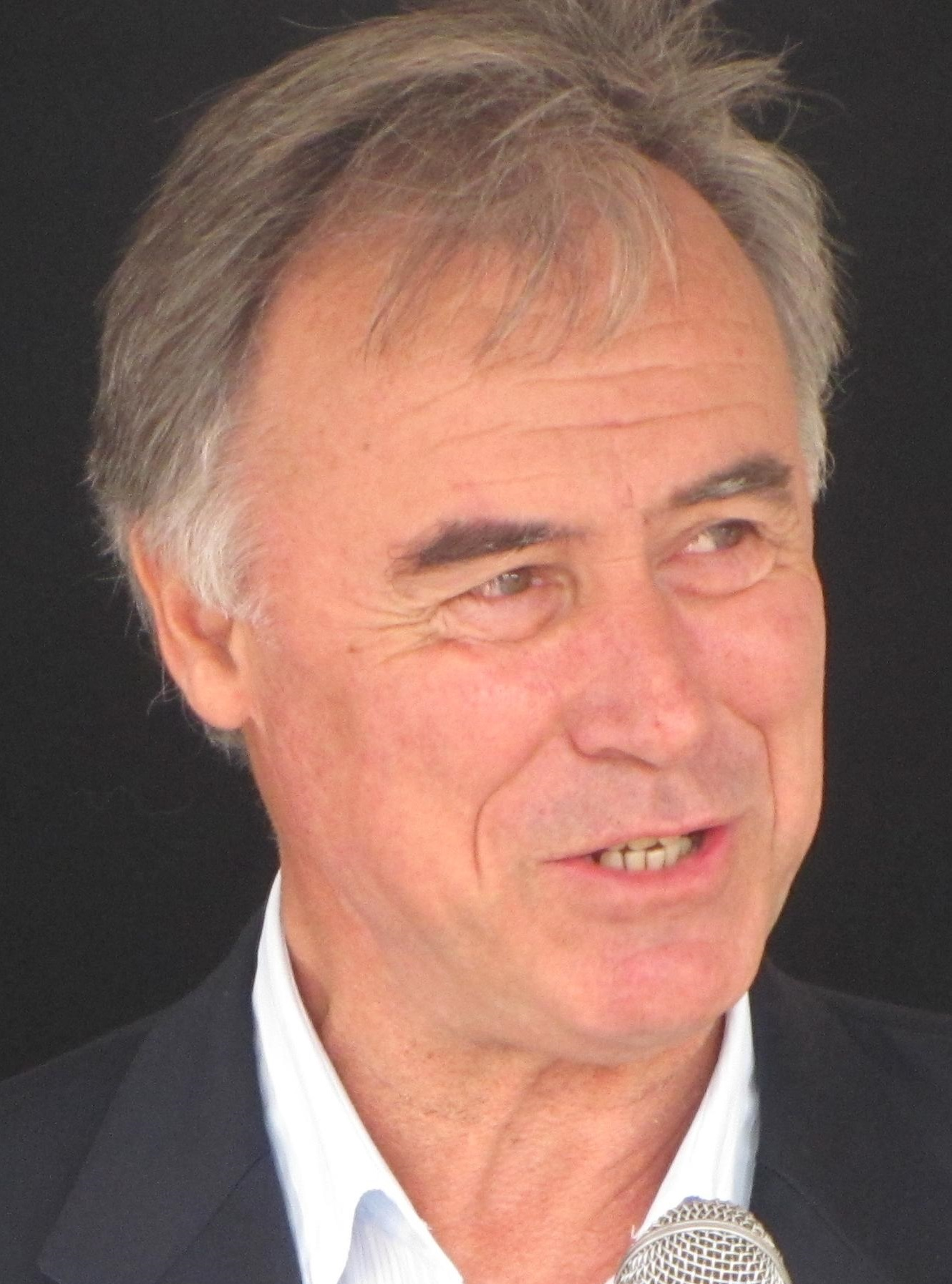

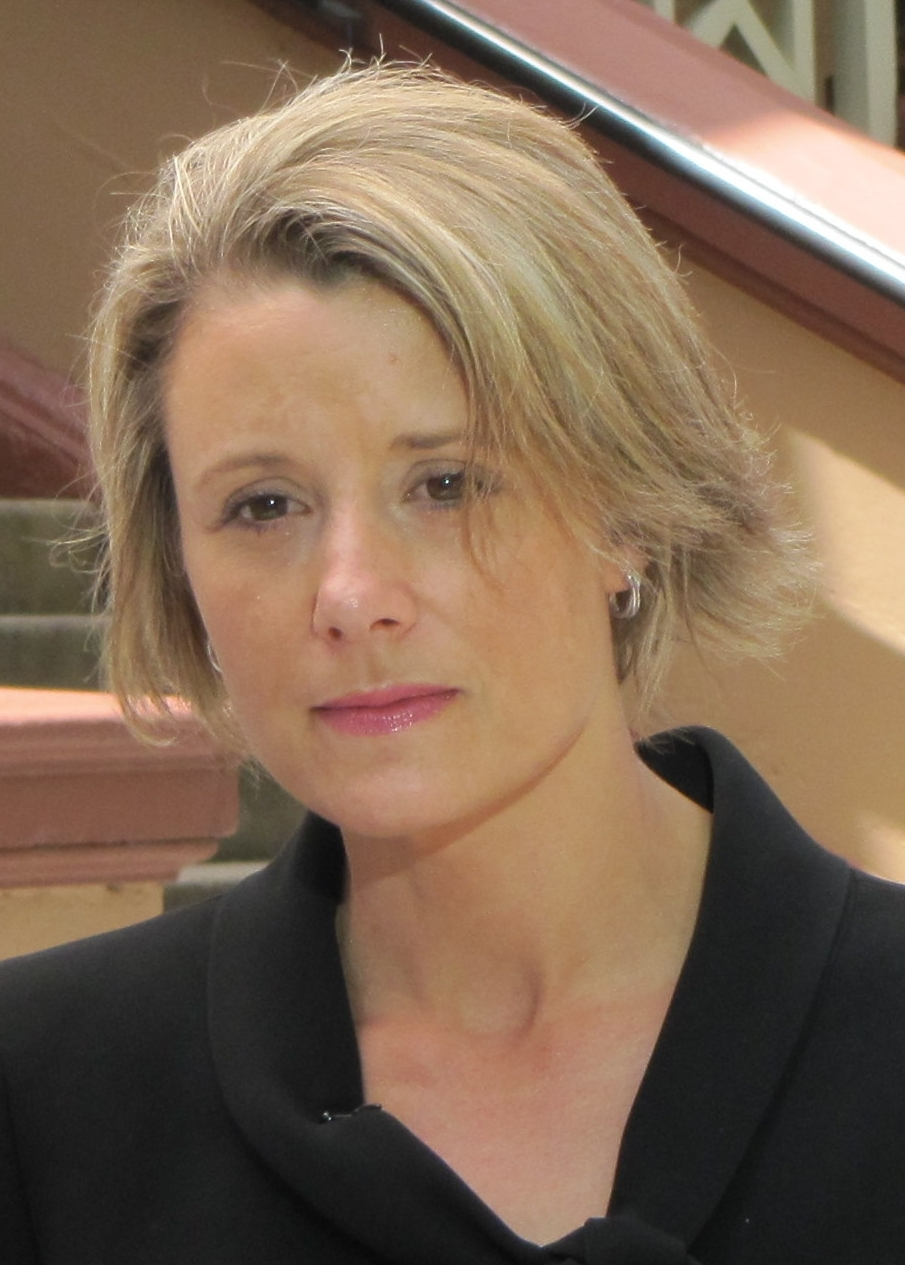
	First party	Second party
Candidate	John Alexander	Kristina Keneally
Party	Liberal	Labor
Primary vote	37,898	30,850
Percentage	45.04%	35.75%
Swing	▼5.37	▲7.27
TPP	54.88%	45.12%
TPP swing	▼4.84	▲4.84
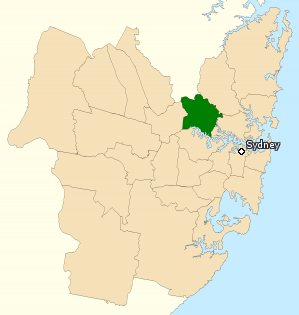
- The Division of Bennelong covers 60 km² in Sydney's lower north shore.
MP before election
John Alexander
Liberal
Elected MP
John Alexander
Liberal

A by-election for the Australian House of Representatives seat of Bennelong was held on 16 December 2017.

Previous incumbent and Liberal candidate John Alexander won the by-election despite a 4.8 percentage point two-party swing to Labor candidate Kristina Keneally which made the seat marginal.

== Background ==
Amid the 2017–18 Australian parliamentary eligibility crisis, the trigger for the by-election was the resignation of Liberal incumbent John Alexander effective 11 November 2017. Following the increased media attention on the citizenship status of parliamentarians, Alexander asked British authorities for evidence of his British-born father renouncing British citizenship. They were unable to find any, leaving Alexander unable to demonstrate he was not a British citizen by descent, meaning he would be ineligible under Section 44 of the Constitution to sit in the Parliament of Australia. Alexander subsequently renounced his British citizenship, in order to nominate for election again.

Speaker of the House of Representatives Tony Smith issued the writ for the election on 13 November 2017, the same day that Alexander submitted his resignation.

== Key dates ==
- Saturday 11 November 2017 – Speaker acceptance of resignation
- Monday 13 November 2017 – Issue of writ
- Monday 20 November 2017 – Close of electoral rolls (8pm)
- Thursday 23 November 2017 – Close of nominations (12 noon)
- Friday 24 November 2017 – Declaration of nominations (12 noon)
- Tuesday 28 November 2017 – Start of early voting
- Saturday 16 December 2017 – Polling day (8am to 6pm)
- Friday 29 December 2017 – Last day for receipt of postal votes
- Sunday 21 February 2018 – Last day for return of writs

As at least 33 days must elapse between the issue of a writ and the date of a by-election, the earliest Saturday that the by-election could take place was on 16 December.

== Candidates ==
12 candidates in ballot paper order
Party	Candidate	Background
Liberty Alliance	Tony Robinson	Orthopaedic surgeon
#Sustainable	Wesley Folitarik	Urban planner
Science	James Jansson	Entrepreneur
Liberal	John Alexander	Bennelong MP 2010−2017 and former professional tennis player
Labor	Kristina Keneally	Journalist, NSW state MP for Heffron 2003−2012 and 42nd Premier of New South Wales 2009−2011
People's	James Platter	Former teacher, writer and former Army Reservist
Greens	Justin Alick	Overseas aid and sustainable development advocate
Affordable Housing	Anthony Ziebell	Software engineer and tenancy advocate
Non-Custodial Parents	Anthony Fels	Former member of the Western Australian Legislative Council
Conservatives	Joram Richa	Manager and conservative activist
Christian Democrats	Gui Dong Cao	Pastor
Progressives	Chris Golding	Former policy officer in the NSW Department of Primary Industries

== Events ==
Following the win by Barnaby Joyce in a similarly Section 44 triggered by-election in the Division of New England on 2 December 2017, the Liberal-National coalition maintained its one-seat majority in the Australian House of Representatives. However, a loss in Bennelong would have left the government reliant on crossbench support. Given this unusual opportunity for an Opposition to destabilise the government's position in parliament outside of a general election, the Labor Party chose former New South Wales Premier Kristina Keneally as a high-profile candidate.

In the months prior to the by-election, the 2017 Australian Marriage Law Postal Survey was conducted asking the question, "Should the law be changed to allow same-sex couples to marry?". Bennelong was among 12 of 47 federal electoral divisions in New South Wales and among 17 of 150 seats nationally to record a majority No response; with Yes on 49.8 percent and No on 50.2 percent, compared to the New South Wales result of Yes on 57.8 percent and No on 42.2 percent, and the national result of Yes on 61.6 percent and No on 38.4 percent. Parliament passed legislation to legalise same-sex marriage on 8 December 2017.

On 12 December 2017, Labor Senator Sam Dastyari announced his intention to resign from the Australian Senate, after weeks of controversy over his links and interactions with Chinese donors. Commentary deriving from Dastyari's statement was mixed, with some commentators signalling it might damage the Labor brand with voters right before they headed to the polls while others pointed to the large Chinese-Australian community in the electorate who might have got an impression that the government was pushing a "China-phobic narrative", given the pressure placed on Dastyari to resign in the weeks prior.

On 14 December 2017, it was revealed that Liberal candidate John Alexander had failed the requirement to declare rental income to the parliamentary register of members' interests from his $1440-a-day 100-acre $4.8-million property in the New South Wales Southern Highlands which he had purchased in June 2017.

== Results ==
2017 Bennelong by-election
Party	Candidate	Votes	%	±%
Liberal	John Alexander	37,898	45.04	−5.37
Labor	Kristina Keneally	30,085	35.75	+7.27
Greens	Justin Alick	5,688	6.76	−2.37
Conservatives	Joram Richa	3,609	4.29	+4.29
Christian Democrats	Gui Dong Cao	2,626	3.12	−3.28
Science	James Jansson	1,041	1.24	+1.24
Sustainable Australia	Wesley Folitarik	995	1.18	+1.18
Affordable Housing	Anthony Ziebell	742	0.88	+0.88
Liberty Alliance	Tony Robinson	719	0.85	+0.85
Progressives	Chris Golding	426	0.51	+0.51
People's Party	James Platter	186	0.22	+0.22
Non-Custodial Parents	Anthony Fels	132	0.16	+0.16
Total formal votes		84,145	91.88	−3.03
Informal votes		7,436	8.12	+3.03
Turnout		91,581	85.96	−5.74
Two-party-preferred result
Liberal	John Alexander	46,179	54.88	−4.84
Labor	Kristina Keneally	37,966	45.12	+4.84
Liberal hold		Swing	−4.84	

Previous incumbent and Liberal candidate John Alexander won the by-election despite a 4.8 percentage point two-party swing to Labor candidate Kristina Keneally which made the seat marginal. The Liberal primary vote was the lowest on record in Bennelong's 68-year history, including the 2007 Bennelong outcome which was the only election in which the Liberals failed to win Bennelong.

== Polling ==
Bennelong by-election polling
Date	Firm	Sample	Primary vote				Two-party vote
			LIB	ALP	GRN	OTH	LIB	ALP
2017 by-election			45.0%	35.8%	6.8%	12.4%	54.9%	45.1%
13–14 Dec 2017	Galaxy	524	40%	38%	8%	14%	51%	49%
12 Dec 2017	ReachTEL	819	41.3%	36.3%	7.5%	14.9%	53%	47%
9–10 Dec 2017	Newspoll	529	39%	39%	9%	13%	50%	50%
16 Nov 2017	ReachTEL	864	41.6%	34.5%	5.9%	18.0%	53%	47%
15 Nov 2017	Galaxy	579	42%	39%	−	−	50%	50%
2016 election			50.4%	28.5%	9.1%	12.0%	59.7%	40.3%

== See also ==
- List of Australian federal by-elections
