= Two-party-preferred vote =

Result of election after distribution of preferences

Instant-runoff (preferential) voting method. TPP/TCP vote is calculated when two candidates remain.

In Australian politics, the two-party-preferred vote (TPP or 2PP) is the result of an opinion poll or a projection of an election result in which preferences are distributed between the two major parties, being the Labor Party and the Liberal-National Coalition, e.g. "Coalition 50%, Labor 50%". The preference distribution is usually based on the results of the most recent election, with votes for other candidates being distributed between the two major parties.

As such, the TPP is a rough indicator of voting intent that focuses on determining the likely majority in the lower house. It is compared to previous values to predict the swing and hence the likelihood of a change in government between the major parliamentary parties.

The TPP assumes a two-party system of government, i.e. that after distribution of votes from less successful candidates, the two remaining candidates will be from each of the two major parties. It provides no indication of the number of representatives of other parties or independent views on the cross-bench, and as the proportion of votes for other candidates increases the TPP becomes less useful. It cannot predict a hung parliament as it does not quantify the alternatives to the two main parties.

The TPP is often confused with the two-candidate-preferred vote (TCP). The TCP is the electoral penultimate result for an electoral division where preferences have been distributed using instant-runoff voting. The winner of the contest is the candidate with over 50% of the TCP vote.

Unlike the TCP, the TPP is informative only and has no direct effect on the election outcome. It is an indicator used for analysing results above seat-level, such as a national or statewide TPP. For individual seats the TCP is the preferred indicator, because when the final two candidates are from the major parties, the TCP will have the same value as the TPP, and when at least one of the final candidates is not from a major party the TPP is misleading, not informative.

The full allocation of preferences under instant-runoff voting is used in the lower houses of the Federal, Queensland, Victorian, Western Australian, South Australian, and Northern Territory parliaments, as well as the upper house of Tasmania. The New South Wales lower house uses optional preferential rather than full preferential voting – with some votes giving limited or no preferences, TPP/TCP is not as meaningful. TPP/TCP does not occur in the Tasmanian lower house or the Australian Capital Territory due to a different system altogether, the Hare–Clark single transferable vote system. Aside from Tasmania, TPP/TCP is not used in any other upper houses in Australia, with most using the single transferable vote method of proportional representation.

== History ==
Australia originally used first-past-the-post voting, as is currently used in the House of Commons of the United Kingdom. Full-preference instant-runoff voting was introduced at the federal level after the 1918 Swan by-election, and has been in use ever since. In that by-election, candidates from the Australian Labor Party, the Nationalist Party government (predecessor to the United Australia Party and Liberal Party of Australia), and the emerging National Party of Australia (the then-"Country Party") all received around a third of the vote. However, as Labor had a plurality of three percent, it won the seat. The new system allowed the two non-Labor parties to compete against one another in many seats without risking losing the seat altogether.

It is increasingly uncommon for seats to be contested by more than one Coalition candidate. For example, in the 2010 federal election, only three seats were contested by more than one Coalition candidate. With the popularity of parties such as the Greens and One Nation, preference flows are very significant for all parties in Australia.

Not distributing preferences was historically common in seats where a candidate received over 50 percent of the primary vote. Federal seat and national TPP results have only been produced as far back as 1937, though it was not uncommon in subsequent decades for major parties at federal elections to not field a candidate in a few "safe" seats, but since 1972, all seats at federal elections have been contested by the major parties. Full preference distributions have occurred in all seats since 1983.

Until recently, South Australian state elections had boundaries strategically redrawn before each election with a fairness aim based on the prior election TPP vote, the only state to do so. The culmination of the historical state lower house seat malapportionment known as the Playmander eventually saw it legislated after 1989 that the Electoral Commission of South Australia would redraw boundaries after each election with the objective of the party that receives over 50 percent of the TPP vote at each forthcoming election forms government. Nationally in 1983/84, minor gerrymandering by incumbent federal governments was legislated against with the formation of an independent statutory authority, the Australian Electoral Commission.

== Procedure ==
Under the full-preference instant-runoff voting system, in each seat, the candidate with the lowest vote is eliminated and their preferences are distributed; this process repeats until only two candidates remain. Whilst every seat has a TCP result, seats where the major parties have come first and second are commonly referred to as having a TPP result. In a TCP contest between Labor and the NSW/Vic Nationals and without a Liberal candidate, this is also considered a TPP, with the Nationals in these states considered a de facto major party within the Liberal/National Coalition. In seats where the major parties do not come first and second, differing TPP and TCP results are returned. When only one of two major parties contest a seat, such as at some by-elections, only a TCP result is produced. Swings in Australian parliaments are more commonly associated with the TPP vote. At the 2013 federal election, 11 of 150 seats returned differing TPP and TCP figures ("non-classic seats"), indicating a considerable two-party system.

The tallying of seat TPP results gives a statewide and/or national TPP vote. Non-classic seats have votes redistributed for informational purposes to the major parties so that every seat has a TPP result. Whilst the TCP is the determining factor in deciding which candidate wins a seat, the overall election TPP is statistical and indicative only, as swings in seats are not uniform, and a varying range of factors can influence marginal-seat wins with single-member electorates. Several federal elections since 1937 have seen a government elected with a minority of the TPP vote: 1940 (49.7%), 1954 (49.3%), 1961 (49.5%), 1969 (49.8%), 1990 (49.9%) and 1998 (49.0%).

As the TPP vote rather than the primary vote is a better indicator of who is in front with seats won and lost on a preferential basis, Australian opinion polls survey voter intention with a TPP always produced. However, these TPP figures tend to be calculated based on preference flows at the previous election rather than asked at the time of polling. The difference between the two is usually within the margin of error (usually +/– 3 percentage points). History has shown that prior-election preference flows are more reliable.

== Three-candidate preferred (3CP) ==
The three-candidate-preferred count (3CP) refers to the second-to-last stage of preference distribution, where three candidates remain. Historically this was not a figure of particular importance, as the primary vote for candidates outside of Labor and the Coalition was low, and thus the top two candidates usually had a lead over any other candidates in the count for House of Representatives seats. However, as the major party vote has fallen, it has increasingly been the case that the final two pairing will not be clear based off primary vote results, and three-candidate-preferred counts have been conducted to determine this.

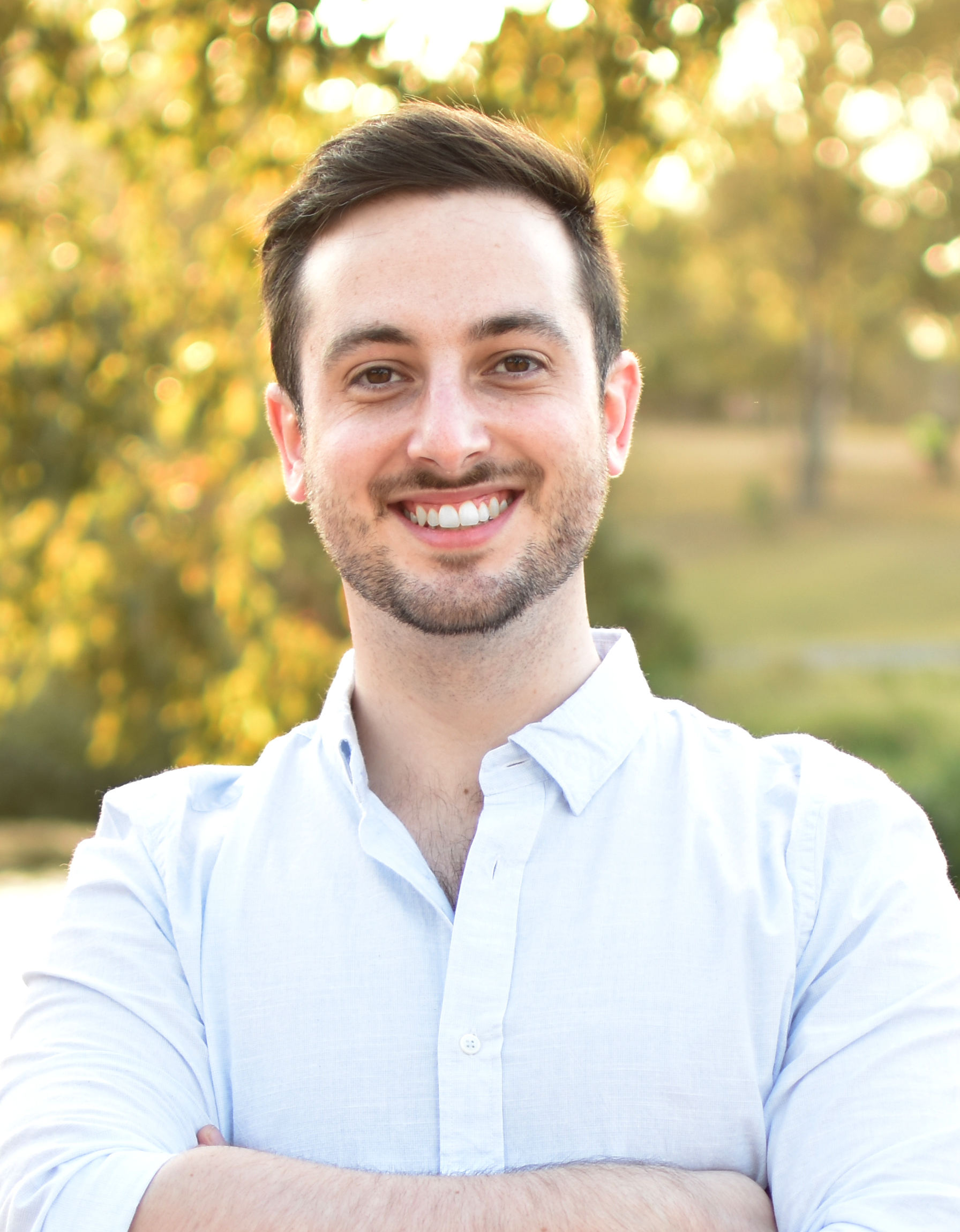
Stephen Bates won the Division of Brisbane despite placing third on primary votes. A three-candidate-preferred count showed he had overtaken second-placed Madonna Jarrett.

The Australian Electoral Commission (AEC) first conducted 3CP counts at the 2022 federal election, in four seats. In Brisbane, the Greens candidate Stephen Bates had placed third on first preferences, but trailed Labor candidate Madonna Jarrett by only eleven votes. Both candidates would have defeated Liberal National incumbent Trevor Evans on the final count, but Bates overtook Jarrett after the distribution of preferences, receiving 30.1% to Jarrett's 28.4%, and polling 53.7% on the two-candidate-preferred against Evans after Jarrett's elimination. The Labor-held seats Macnamara and Richmond also saw gaps of less than 3.5% between the first and third-placed candidates. In both seats, a third-placed Coalition candidate overtook a second-placed Greens candidate after preferences, and Greens preferences easily elected the Labor candidate.

At the 2025 federal election, the AEC conducted 3CP counts in thirteen seats. In Ryan, the first-placed Liberal National candidate, Maggie Forrest, had clearly lost, but whether she would face Greens incumbent Elizabeth Watson-Brown or Labor candidate Rebecca Hack was unclear. The 3CP count showed Watson-Brown leading Hack by 0.78%, and thus Watson-Brown was re-elected. The divisions of Fisher, Forrest, and Grey were contests between the Coalition, Labor, and independent candidates, and it was unclear whether Labor would make the final count and be defeated by the Coalition, or whether the independent would make the final count and potentially win, as independents generally benefit more from Labor preferences than vice versa.

The increasing complexity of preference distributions can incentivise tactical voting. At the 2024 Northern Territory election in Fannie Bay, Laurie Zio of the Country Liberal Party defeated Labor incumbent Brent Potter, who placed third behind Greens candidate Suki Dorras-Walker on both primary votes and the 3CP count. Dorras-Walker was defeated by Zio after preferences were distributed, but the two-party-preferred count, between the Country Liberal and Labor parties, was won by Potter. This meant that, had 54 Greens voters instead first-preferenced Labor, Dorras-Walker would have been eliminated before the final count, and Potter would have defeated Zio. This phenomenon has been described as the Fannie Bay effect. It existed in reverse at the 2014 Victorian state election. In Prahran, the Greens candidate won a seat against the Liberal Party that the Labor candidate would have lost, judging by the two-party-preferred count. Additionally, a number of teal independents have performed better than Labor after preferences. However, as with the case of the Greens, this has not universally been true, as Labor was likely to have performed better against the Coalition in 2025 for the seat of Bradfield, where independent Nicolette Boele won with only 50.01% at the final count.

== Analysis ==
After the count has taken place, it is possible to analyze the ultimate preference flows for votes cast for the parties that were ultimately excluded from the TPP calculation, in order to determine if the composite flow would have significantly affected the final result. Such an exercise is shown for the 2017 by-election in Bennelong:

2017 Bennelong by-election – preference flow data
Party	Candidate	First preferences		% preference to	
Party	Candidate	Votes	%	Liberal	Labor
Greens	Justin Alick	5,688	6.8	19.7	80.3
Conservatives	Joram Richa	3,609	4.3	86.5	13.5
Christian Democrats	Gui Dong Cao	2,626	3.1	72.4	27.6
Science	James Jansson	1,041	1.2	39.4	60.6
Sustainable Australia	Wesley Folitarik	995	1.2	48.9	51.1
Affordable Housing	Anthony Ziebell	741	0.9	44.7	55.3
Liberty Alliance	Tony Robinson	719	0.9	79.0	21.0
Progressives	Chris Golding	425	0.5	42.1	57.9
People's Party	James Platter	186	0.2	48.9	51.1
Non-Custodial Parents	Anthony Fels	132	0.2	56.1	43.9
Totals		16,162	19.2	51.2	48.8

=== Preference flows in federal elections ===
2019 Australian federal election – preference flow data
Party	First preferences		% preference to	
Party	Votes	%	Liberal	Labor
Greens	1,482,923	10.40	17.8	82.2
United Australia Party	488,817	3.43	65.1	34.9
Independent	479,836	3.37	40.6	59.4
One Nation	438,587	3.08	65.2	34.8
Christian Democrat	116,675	0.68	74.4	25.6
Conservative Nationals	77,203	0.54	71.8	28.2
Katter's Australia	69,736	0.49	67.0	33.0
Centre Alliance	46,931	0.33	32.9	67.1
Shooters, Fishers, Farmers	41,479	0.29	59.1	40.9
Sustainable Australia	35,618	0.25	46.0	54.0
Liberal Democrats	34,666	0.24	77.2	22.8

- 2010 election
- 2013 election
- 2016 election
- 2019 election
- 2022 election
- 2025 election

== Examples ==
=== Federal, Swan 1918 ===
1918 Swan by-election: Division of Swan, Western Australia
Party	Candidate	Votes	%	±%
Labor	Edwin Corboy	6,540	34.4	N/A
Country	Basil Murray	5,975	31.4	N/A
Nationalist	William Hedges	5,635	29.6	N/A
Independent	William Watson	884	4.6	N/A
Turnout		19,213	64.3%	
Labor gain from Nationalist		Swing	N/A	

The result of the 1918 Swan by-election, the first-past-the-post election which caused the government of the day to introduce full-preference instant-runoff voting, under which Labor would have been easily defeated. Labor won the seat, and their majority was 3.0 points (34.4 minus 31.4). No swings are available as the Nationalists retained the seat unopposed at the previous election.

=== Federal, Adelaide 2004 ===
2004 Australian federal election: Division of Adelaide, South Australia
Party	Candidate	Votes	%	±%
Liberal	Trish Worth	38,530	45.29	+0.82
Labor	Kate Ellis	35,666	41.92	+5.50
Greens	Jake Bugden	6,794	7.99	+2.02
Family First	Peter G Robins	1,753	2.06	+2.06
Democrats	Richard Pascoe	1,355	1.59	–9.30
Independent	Amanda Barlow	978	1.15	+1.15
Total formal votes		85,076	95.60	+0.66
Informal votes		3,920	4.40	–0.66
Turnout		88,996	93.62	–1.09
Two-party-preferred result
Labor	Kate Ellis	43,671	51.33	+1.95
Liberal	Trish Worth	41,405	48.67	–1.95
Labor gain from Liberal		Swing	+1.95	

It can be seen that the Liberal candidate had a primary vote lead over the Labor candidate. In a first-past-the-post vote, the Liberals would have retained the seat, and their majority would be said to be 3.4 points (45.3 minus 41.9).

However, under full-preference instant-runoff voting, the votes of all the minor candidates were distributed as follows:

2nd count: Barlow 978 votes distributed
Party	Candidate	Added votes	%	Votes	%
Liberal	Trish Worth	172	17.6	38,702	45.5
Labor	Kate Ellis	206	21.1	35,872	42.2
Greens	Jake Bugden	365	37.3	7,159	8.4
Family First	Peter G Robins	96	9.8	1,849	2.2
Democrats	Richard Pascoe	139	14.2	1,494	1.8
Total		978		85,076	

3rd count: Democrats 1,494 votes distributed
Party	Candidate	Added votes	%	Votes	%
Liberal	Trish Worth	343	23.0	39,045	45.9
Labor	Kate Ellis	494	33.1	36,366	42.8
Greens	Jake Bugden	560	37.5	7,719	9.1
Family First	Peter G Robins	97	6.5	1,946	2.3
Total		1,494		85,076	

4th count: Family First 1,946 votes distributed
Party	Candidate	Added votes	%	Votes	%
Liberal	Trish Worth	1,098	56.4	40,143	47.2
Labor	Kate Ellis	377	19.4	36,743	43.2
Greens	Jake Bugden	471	24.2	8,190	9.6
Total		1,946		85,076	

5th count: Greens 8,190 votes distributed – final TPP/TCP
Party	Candidate	Added votes	%	Votes	%
Labor	Kate Ellis	6,928	84.6	43,671	51.3
Liberal	Trish Worth	1,262	15.4	41,405	48.7
Total		8,190		85,076	1.3

The process of allocating the votes can be more succinctly shown thus:

2004 Australian federal election: Division of Adelaide, South Australia Allocation of votes by count
Party	Candidate	Count					
Party	Candidate	1st	2nd	3rd	4th	5th	Total
Labor	Kate Ellis	35,666	206	494	377	6,928	43,671
Liberal	Trish Worth	38,530	172	343	1,098	1,262	41,405
Greens	Jake Bugden	6,794	365	560	471	(8,190)	
Family First	Peter G Robins	1,753	96	97	(1,946)		
Democrats	Richard Pascoe	1,355	139	(1,494)			
Independent	Amanda Barlow	978	(978)				

Thus, Labor defeated the Liberals, with 85 percent of Green and Green-preferenced voters preferencing Labor on the last distribution. Labor's TPP/TCP vote was 51.3 percent, a TPP/TCP majority of 1.3 points, and a TPP/TCP swing of 1.9 points compared with the previous election.

=== South Australia, Frome 2009 ===
2009 Frome state by-election: Electoral district of Frome, South Australia
Party	Candidate	Votes	%	±%
Liberal	Terry Boylan	7,576	39.24	–8.86
Labor	John Rohde	5,041	26.11	–14.93
Independent	Geoff Brock	4,557	23.60	+23.60
National	Neville Wilson	1,267	6.56	+6.56
Greens	Joy O'Brien	734	3.80	+0.06
One Nation	Peter Fitzpatrick	134	0.69	+0.69
Total formal votes		19,309	97.12	+0.21
Informal votes		573	2.88	–0.21
Turnout		19,882	89.79	–4.44
Two-party-preferred result
Liberal	Terry Boylan	9,976	51.67	–1.74
Labor	John Rohde	9,333	48.33	+1.74
Two-candidate-preferred result
Independent	Geoff Brock	9,987	51.72	+51.72
Liberal	Terry Boylan	9,322	48.28	–5.13
Independent gain from Liberal		Swing	N/A	

The 2009 Frome by-election was closely contested, with the result being uncertain for over a week. Liberal leader Martin Hamilton-Smith claimed victory on behalf of the party. The result hinged on the performance of Brock against Labor in the competition for second place. Brock polled best in the Port Pirie area, and received enough eliminated candidate preferences to end up ahead of the Labor candidate by 30 votes.

Distribution of Preferences – 4th count
Party	Candidate	Votes	%	±%
Liberal	Terry Boylan	8,215	42.54	
Independent	Geoff Brock	5,562	28.81	
Labor	John Rohde	5,532	28.65	

Brock received 80 percent of Labor's fifth count preferences to achieve a TCP vote of 51.72 percent (a majority of 665 votes) against the Liberal candidate. The by-election saw a rare TPP swing to an incumbent government, and was the first time an opposition had lost a seat at a by-election in South Australia. The result in Frome at the 2010 state election saw Brock come first on primary votes, increasing his primary vote by 14.1 points to a total of 37.7 percent and his TCP vote by 6.5 points to a total of 58.2 percent. Despite a state-wide swing against Labor at the election, Labor again increased its TPP vote in Frome by 1.8 points to a total of 50.1 percent.

=== Federal, Melbourne 2010 ===
2010 Australian federal election: Division of Melbourne, Victoria
Party	Candidate	Votes	%	±%
Labor	Cath Bowtell	34,022	38.09	–11.42
Greens	Adam Bandt	32,308	36.17	+13.37
Liberal	Simon Olsen	18,760	21.00	–2.49
Sex Party	Joel Murray	1,633	1.83	+1.83
Family First	Georgia Pearson	1,389	1.55	+0.55
Secular	Penelope Green	613	0.69	+0.69
Democrats	David Collyer	602	0.67	–0.76
Total formal votes		89,327	96.38	–0.82
Informal votes		3,356	3.62	+0.82
Turnout		92,683	90.09	–1.41
Two-party-preferred result
Labor	Cath Bowtell	65,473	73.30	+1.03
Liberal	Simon Olsen	23,854	26.70	–1.03
Two-candidate-preferred result
Greens	Adam Bandt	50,059	56.04	+10.75
Labor	Cath Bowtell	39,268	43.96	–10.75
Greens gain from Labor		Swing	+10.75	

In this example, the two remaining candidates/parties, one a minor party, were the same after preference distribution at both this election and the previous election. Therefore, differing TPP and TCP votes, margins, and swings resulted.

=== South Australia, Port Adelaide 2012 ===
2012 Port Adelaide state by-election: Electoral district of Pt Adelaide, South Australia
Party	Candidate	Votes	%	±%
Labor	Susan Close	8,218	42.3	–7.6
Independent	Gary Johanson	4,717	24.3	+24.3
Independent	Sue Lawrie	2,938	15.1	+15.1
Liberal Democrats	Stephen Humble	1,415	7.3	+7.3
Greens	Justin McArthur	1,096	5.6	–0.6
Independent	Colin Thomas	314	1.6	+1.6
Independent	Bob Briton	292	1.5	+1.5
One Nation	Grant Carlin	269	1.4	+1.4
Democratic Labor	Elizabeth Pistor	151	0.8	+0.8
Total formal votes		19,410	92.8	–3.8
Informal votes		1,505	7.2	+3.8
Turnout		20,915	82.8	–10.4
Two-candidate-preferred result
Labor	Susan Close	10,277	52.9	–9.8
Independent	Gary Johanson	9,133	47.1	+47.1
Labor hold		Swing	N/A	

At the 2012 Port Adelaide state by-election, only a TCP could be produced, as the Liberal Party of Australia (and Family First Party and independent candidate Max James), who contested the previous election and gained a primary vote of 26.8 percent (and 5.9 percent, and 11.0 percent respectively), did not contest the by-election. On a TPP margin of 12.8 points from the 2010 election, considered a safe margin on the current pendulum, Labor would probably have retained their TPP margin based on unchanged statewide Newspoll since the previous election. Labor retained the seat on a 52.9 percent TCP against Johanson after the distribution of preferences.

Unlike previous examples, neither a TPP or TCP swing can be produced, as the 2010 result was between Labor and Liberal rather than Labor and independent with no Liberal candidate. An increase or decrease in margins in these situations cannot be meaningfully interpreted as swings. As explained by the ABC's Antony Green, when a major party does not contest a by-election, preferences from independents or minor parties that would normally flow to both major parties does not take place, causing asymmetric preference flows. Examples of this are the 2008 Mayo and 2002 Cunningham federal by-elections, with seats returning to TPP form at the next election. This contradicts News Ltd claims of large swings and a potential Liberal Party win in Port Adelaide at the next election.

== House of Representatives primary, two-party and seat results ==
A two-party system has existed in the Australian House of Representatives since the two non-Labor parties merged in 1909. The 1910 election was the first to elect a majority government, with the Australian Labor Party concurrently winning the first Senate majority. Prior to 1909 a three-party system existed in the chamber. A two-party-preferred vote (2PP) has been retrospectively calculated from the 1919 election change from first-past-the-post to preferential voting and subsequent introduction of the Coalition.

ALP = Australian Labor Party, L+NP = grouping of Liberal/National/LNP/CLP Coalition parties (and predecessors), Oth = other parties and independents.

House of Representatives results and polling
Election Year		Labour	Free Trade	Protectionist	Independent	Other parties		Total seats
1st	1901	14	28	31	2			75
Election Year		Labour	Free Trade	Protectionist	Independent	Other parties		Total seats
2nd	1903	23	25	26		1	Revenue Tariff	75
Election Year		Labour	Anti-Socialist	Protectionist	Independent	Other parties		Total seats
3rd	1906	26	26	21	1	1	Western Australian	75

	Primary vote			2PP vote		Seats
	ALP	L+NP	Oth.	ALP	L+NP	ALP	L+NP	Oth.	Total
13 April 1910 election	50.0%	45.1%	4.9%	–	–	42	31	2	75
31 May 1913 election	48.5%	48.9%	2.6%	–	–	37	38	0	75
5 September 1914 election	50.9%	47.2%	1.9%	–	–	42	32	1	75
5 May 1917 election	43.9%	54.2%	1.9%	–	–	22	53	0	75
13 December 1919 election	42.5%	54.3%	3.2%	45.9%	54.1%	25	38	2	75
16 December 1922 election	42.3%	47.8%	9.9%	48.8%	51.2%	29	40	6	75
14 November 1925 election	45.0%	53.2%	1.8%	46.2%	53.8%	23	50	2	75
17 November 1928 election	44.6%	49.6%	5.8%	48.4%	51.6%	31	42	2	75
12 October 1929 election	48.8%	44.2%	7.0%	56.7%	43.3%	46	24	5	75
19 December 1931 election	27.1%	48.4%	24.5%	41.5%	58.5%	14	50	11	75
15 September 1934 election	26.8%	45.6%	27.6%	46.5%	53.5%	18	42	14	74
23 October 1937 election	43.2%	49.3%	7.5%	49.4%	50.6%	29	43	2	74
21 September 1940 election	40.2%	43.9%	15.9%	50.3%	49.7%	32	36	6	74
21 August 1943 election	49.9%	23.0%	27.1%	58.2%	41.8%	49	19	6	74
28 September 1946 election	49.7%	39.3%	11.0%	54.1%	45.9%	43	26	5	74
10 December 1949 election	46.0%	50.3%	3.7%	49.0%	51.0%	47	74	0	121
28 April 1951 election	47.6%	50.3%	2.1%	49.3%	50.7%	52	69	0	121
29 May 1954 election	50.0%	46.8%	3.2%	50.7%	49.3%	57	64	0	121
10 December 1955 election	44.6%	47.6%	7.8%	45.8%	54.2%	47	75	0	122
22 November 1958 election	42.8%	46.6%	10.6%	45.9%	54.1%	45	77	0	122
9 December 1961 election	47.9%	42.1%	10.0%	50.5%	49.5%	60	62	0	122
30 November 1963 election	45.5%	46.0%	8.5%	47.4%	52.6%	50	72	0	122
26 November 1966 election	40.0%	50.0%	10.0%	43.1%	56.9%	41	82	1	124
25 October 1969 election	47.0%	43.3%	9.7%	50.2%	49.8%	59	66	0	125
2 December 1972 election	49.6%	41.5%	8.9%	52.7%	47.3%	67	58	0	125
18 May 1974 election	49.3%	44.9%	5.8%	51.7%	48.3%	66	61	0	127
13 December 1975 election	42.8%	53.1%	4.1%	44.3%	55.7%	36	91	0	127
10 December 1977 election	39.7%	48.1%	12.2%	45.4%	54.6%	38	86	0	124
18 October 1980 election	45.2%	46.3%	8.5%	49.6%	50.4%	51	74	0	125
5 March 1983 election	49.5%	43.6%	6.9%	53.2%	46.8%	75	50	0	125
1 December 1984 election	47.6%	45.0%	7.4%	51.8%	48.2%	82	66	0	148
11 July 1987 election	45.8%	46.1%	8.1%	50.8%	49.2%	86	62	0	148
24 March 1990 election	39.4%	43.5%	17.1%	49.9%	50.1%	78	69	1	148
11 Mar 1993 Newspoll	44%	45%	11%	49.5%	50.5%
13 March 1993 election	44.9%	44.3%	10.7%	51.4%	48.6%	80	65	2	147
28–29 Feb 1996 Newspoll	40.5%	48%	11.5%	46.5%	53.5%
2 March 1996 election	38.7%	47.3%	14.0%	46.4%	53.6%	49	94	5	148
30 Sep – 1 Oct 1998 Newspoll	44%	40%	16%	53%	47%
3 October 1998 election	40.1%	39.5%	20.4%	51.0%	49.0%	67	80	1	148
7–8 Nov 2001 Newspoll	38.5%	46%	15.5%	47%	53%
10 November 2001 election	37.8%	43.0%	19.2%	49.0%	51.0%	65	82	3	150
6–7 Oct 2004 Newspoll	39%	45%	16%	50%	50%
9 October 2004 election	37.6%	46.7%	15.7%	47.3%	52.7%	60	87	3	150
20–22 Nov 2007 Newspoll	44%	43%	13%	52%	48%
24 November 2007 election	43.4%	42.1%	14.5%	52.7%	47.3%	83	65	2	150
17–19 Aug 2010 Newspoll	36%	43.5%	20.5%	50.2%	49.8%
21 August 2010 election	38.0%	43.3%	18.7%	50.1%	49.9%	72	72	6	150
3–5 Sep 2013 Newspoll	33%	46%	21%	46%	54%
7 September 2013 election	33.4%	45.6%	21.0%	46.5%	53.5%	55	90	5	150
28 Jun – 1 Jul 2016 Newspoll	35%	42%	23%	49.5%	50.5%
2 July 2016 election	34.7%	42.0%	23.3%	49.6%	50.4%	69	76	5	150
15–16 May 2019 Newspoll	37%	39%	25%	51.5%	48.5%
18 May 2019 election	33.3%	41.4%	25.2%	48.5%	51.5%	68	77	6	151
13–19 May 2022 Newspoll	36%	35%	29%	53%	47%
21 May 2022 election	32.6%	35.7%	31.7%	52.1%	47.9%	77	58	16	151
28 Apr – 1 May 2025 Newspoll	33%	34%	33%	52.5%	47.5%
3 May 2025 election	34.6%	31.8%	33.6%	55.2%	44.8%	94	43	13	150
Polling conducted by Newspoll and published in The Australian. Around three percent margin of error.

== Non-standard contests ==
In seats not held or won by minor parties, the two-party-preferred contest is almost always between either both major parties (Coalition vs. Labor) or (less commonly) between a major party and an independent, there have been some cases in certain electorates where the contest has been between a major party and a minor party (and the major party wins).

=== Federal examples ===
In many inner-city seats that are safely held by Labor, the Greens finish second place. As of 2022, this occurred in the seats of Cooper and Wills in inner-city Melbourne, Grayndler and Sydney in inner-city Sydney and (since 2022) Canberra, which covers the inner-city and eastern suburbs of Canberra. In 2019, the Greens also finished second for the first time in the Melbourne seat of Kooyong, which was held by the Liberals until 2022, when it was won by teal independent Monique Ryan. In 2016, the Greens also finished second in the seats of Higgins in Melbourne and Warringah in Sydney. The Greens also finished second in the now-abolished Melbourne seat of Batman in the 2010, 2013 and 2016 elections, as well as in the 2018 by-election. Plus, before the Greens won the seat of Melbourne in 2010, the Greens had finished second in that electorate in 2007.

In 2016 and 2019, One Nation finished second in the seat of Maranoa in outback Queensland.

In 2016, the Nick Xenophon Team (NXT) finished second in three South Australian electorates: Barker, Grey and Port Adelaide (the latter of which has since been abolished).

=== State examples ===
In New South Wales, there were only two electorates where minor parties finished second to a major party at the 2023 state election (Labor won both electorates); the Greens finished second in Summer Hill and One Nation finished second in Cessnock. At the previous state election in 2019, the Greens finished second in four seats (Davidson, Manly, Pittwater and Vaucluse), all of which were won by the Liberals and were all located in Sydney.

In Victoria, the Greens finished second to Labor in four Melbourne seats in 2022. These were Footscray, Northcote, Pascoe Vale, Preston.

In Queensland, One Nation often finishes second in many regional electorates. At the 2020 Queensland state election, One Nation finished first in Mirani but finished second in just one seat, Bundamba, where they finished second to Labor. This happened again in Bundamba at a by-election held in the same year. At the previous election in 2017, however, One Nation finished second in 18 seats across Queensland. At this election, the Greens finished second in South Brisbane, a seat they gained in 2020.

In Western Australia, the Greens finished second to Labor in Fremantle at the 2021 state election.

== See also ==
- Mackerras pendulum
- Median voter theorem
- Nonpartisan blanket primary
- Two-round system
