= Michael Gunner =

Australian politician

The Honourable Michael Gunner
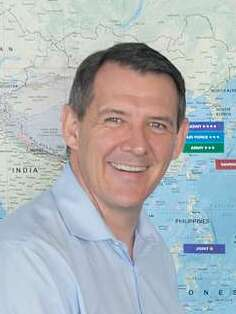
- Gunner in 2017

11th Chief Minister of the Northern Territory
- In office 31 August 2016 – 13 May 2022
- Deputy: Nicole Manison
- Administrator: John Hardy; Vicki O'Halloran
- Preceded by: Adam Giles
- Succeeded by: Natasha Fyles

Treasurer of the Northern Territory
- In office 8 September 2020 – 13 May 2022
- Preceded by: Nicole Manison
- Succeeded by: Natasha Fyles

11th Leader of the Opposition in the Northern Territory
- In office 20 April 2015 – 31 August 2016
- Deputy: Lynne Walker
- Preceded by: Delia Lawrie
- Succeeded by: Gary Higgins

Member of the Northern Territory Legislative Assembly for Fannie Bay
- In office 9 August 2008 – 27 July 2022
- Preceded by: Clare Martin
- Succeeded by: Brent Potter

Personal details
- Born: Michael Patrick Francis Gunner; 6 January 1976 (age 50) Alice Springs, Northern Territory, Australia
- Party: Australian Labor Party
- Spouse: Kristy O'Brien
- Education: Charles Darwin University
- Occupation: Political adviser
- Cabinet: Gunner Ministry

Michael Patrick Francis Gunner (born 6 January 1976) is an Australian former politician who was the 11th Chief Minister of the Northern Territory from 2016 to 2022. He was a Labor member of the Northern Territory Legislative Assembly, holding the seat of Fannie Bay in Darwin from the retirement of then Chief Minister Clare Martin at the 2008 election until his resignation in July 2022.

Gunner was elected Labor leader in the Northern Territory, becoming Leader of the Opposition, in April 2015. He led Labor to a landslide victory in the 2016 Northern Territory election. He was sworn in on 31 August, the first Northern Territory Chief Minister to have been born there. Gunner led Labor to another victory in the 2020 election, albeit with a reduced majority.

On 10 May 2022, Gunner announced his intention to resign the position of Chief Minister. On 27 July 2022, Gunner resigned his position as member for Fannie Bay.

== Early life ==
Gunner was born in Alice Springs in 1976, the eldest of four children, to Mick and Jane Gunner. His great-grandfather settled in Tennant Creek in the 1930s from Tbilisi in Georgia, fleeing the country after the Russian Revolution. He has Indigenous relatives in Utopia north of Alice Springs.

Gunner went to school in Alice Springs, Tennant Creek and Darwin. He began a law degree at Northern Territory University (now Charles Darwin University), switching to a Bachelor of Arts degree which he completed. He supported himself by working at retail chain Big W and as an electorate officer. He has represented the Territory in rugby union. Gunner went on to work as a senior government ministerial and policy adviser between 2001 and 2008 to former Chief Minister Clare Martin.

== Early political career ==
Northern Territory Legislative Assembly
Years	Term	Electoral division	Party
2008–2012	11th	Fannie Bay	Labor
2012–2016	12th	Fannie Bay	Labor
2016–2020	13th	Fannie Bay	Labor
2020–2022	14th	Fannie Bay	Labor

=== Member for Fannie Bay ===
Gunner was elected to the Northern Territory Legislative Assembly for the Electoral division of Fannie Bay in 2008 after the retirement of Chief Minister Clare Martin at the 2008 election. The election saw Gunner retain the seat for the Labor Party by only a slight margin, over Garry Lambert, former alderman and acting Lord Mayor.

=== Opposition Leader ===
After a failed attempt in 2013, on 19 April 2015 Gunner announced he would stand for the leadership of the Northern Territory Labor Party against incumbent Delia Lawrie, who was facing criticism of her conduct during an inquiry into the gifting of heritage property Stella Maris to Unions NT while she was a minister. Four days later, Lawrie resigned and Gunner was elected unopposed as leader. He held the portfolios of Major Projects, Northern Australia Development, Police, Fire and Emergency Services, Open and Transparent Government and Business and was Shadow Treasurer. Originally a member of Labor Right, Gunner became factionally unaligned, resigning from the Right after taking over as Opposition Leader. Gunner moved a Motion of No Confidence against the Adam Giles Government on 1 December 2015 but was unsuccessful.

== Chief Minister ==
=== 2016 election ===
Labor went into the 2016 territory election as unbackable favourites, with Northern Territory opinion polls indicating a massive swing against the CLP. Additionally, at the 2016 federal election held two months earlier, Labor picked up a healthy seven-point swing in the Territory, and took the federal seat of Solomon—which is largely coextensive with the Darwin/Palmerston area—off the CLP in a large swing.

At the 27 August Territory election, Gunner led Territory Labor to one of the most comprehensive election victories on record at the state or territory level in Australia. Labor won 18 seats in the 25-member Legislative Assembly on a swing of over 14 percent, the largest two-party swing on record in the Territory. En route, Labor took all but one seat in Darwin/Palmerston, and even ousted Giles in his own seat—only the second time that a Majority Leader/Chief Minister had been rolled in his own electorate. The CLP was cut down to just two seats − the worst defeat of a sitting government in the Territory's history, and among the worst ever suffered by a state or territory government in Australia. Gunner declared that Territorians had "rejected the chaos of the last four years", in part a reference to the numerous reshuffles that had taken place during the previous government, including multiple leadership spills.

Normal practice in Australia calls for a defeated government to stay in office on a caretaker basis until the final results are in. However, with Labor's victory beyond doubt even though counting continued until early September, Gunner arranged to have Administrator John Hardy swear himself, Natasha Fyles, and Nicole Manison as an interim three-person government until all prospective ministers were confirmed as elected. Accordingly, Gunner was sworn in as Chief Minister on 31 August 2016. Gunner held 38 portfolios in the three-person ministry in contrast to Manison solely as Treasurer and Fyles as just Attorney General and Justice Minister. His full ministry was selected on 11 September and sworn in the next day, with Manison as his Deputy Chief Minister after former deputy leader Lynne Walker was narrowly defeated in her own seat. Notably, a majority of the new cabinet -five of its eight members − were women.

=== First term ===
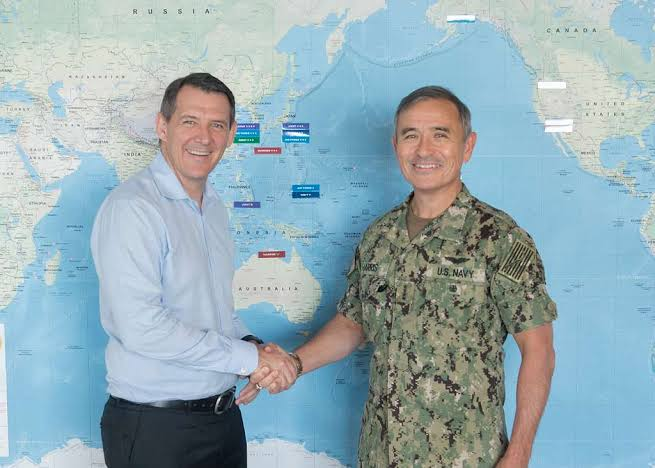
Gunner shaking hands with United States Navy Admiral Harry B. Harris Jr. in 2017.

Gunner entered office in a formidable position. He won the third-largest majority government in Territory history (just percentage points behind Labor's 2005 landslide), and faced only two CLP members as opposition − fewer than the five independents in the chamber. Although Labor was technically the only official party in the legislature, Gunner pledged that the CLP would be properly resourced as an opposition.

Despite Labor's massive majority, Gunner retained CLP-turned-independent Kezia Purick as Speaker of the Northern Territory Legislative Assembly for a second term.

A perennial election issue, Labor removed the CLP's open speed limit and implemented a 130 km/h speed limit along a 300 km stretch of the Stuart Highway between Alice Springs and Tennant Creek.

Gunner ordered a moratorium on fracking, and also undertook a review of all water licences issued under the previous government. The moratorium commenced on 14 September. On 17 April 2018, the moratorium was revoked.

Gunner has expressed support for Chinese government investment in the Northern Territory in the form of the Belt and Road Initiative.

=== 2020 election ===
Gunner led Territory Labor through the 2020 NT election. Labor heavily centered their campaign around Gunner's leadership and government handling of the COVID-19 pandemic, even going as far to say the election was, "literally the difference between life and death," which drew criticism from his opponents. Before the election, opinion polls suggested that Labor would suffer an almost certain swing against them, with the newcomer Territory Alliance party posing a serious threat to the typical two-party system that has dominated NT politics.

Nevertheless, on election night, ABC psephologist Antony Green projected that Labor would win at least a minority government almost three hours after the polls closed. Gunner later declared victory an hour later, saying that he was "very confident" that Labor had won another term, with the Country Liberals refusing to concede defeat on election night.

Ultimately, Gunner led Labor to win 14 of the 25 seats in the Legislative Assembly. Labor suffered a net four seat drop from the 2016 landslide, but retained a bare majority of two seats. Labor grabbed all but two seats in the Darwin/Palmerston area, even managing to oust Territory Alliance leader and former CLP Chief Minister Terry Mills from his own seat of Blain. The CLP, under Lia Finocchiaro, managed to snatch some of its usual heartland seats in Alice Springs and Katherine back from Labor that were swept away amid the massive 2016 landslide, allowing it to quadruple its seat count to eight.

=== Second term ===
Gunner announced his new cabinet on the 7 September 2020. Gunner himself dropped half of his portfolios in favour for Treasurer, a portfolio once held by Manison. Like his previous cabinets, a majority of the members are women - outnumbering men 6 to 3.

==== COVID-19 pandemic ====
Michael Gunner
(@fanniebay)
tweeted:

Replying to @tedcruz

G'day from Down Under @tedcruz. Thanks for your interest in the Territory. I'm the Chief Minister. Below are a few facts about COVID down here.

18 October 2021

Gunner led the Northern Territory's response to the COVID-19 pandemic.

In October 2021, the United States Senator from Texas Ted Cruz posted a tweet that was critical of the Northern Territory's vaccine mandates. Gunner's response to the tweet went viral quickly.

==== Resignation ====
On 10 May 2022, Gunner announced his resignation from his positions as the NT Chief Minister and Treasurer, citing a desire to spend more time with his family. On 27 July 2022, two and a half months after he resigned as Chief Minister, Gunner announced in a speech to the Legislative Assembly his resignation as the member for Fannie Bay. On 29 July, an ICAC report was tabled in Parliament which stated that Gunner had declined to provide cabinet documents to Independent Commissioner Against Corruption, Michael Riches, regarding a "serious allegation" that a cabinet submission had been "edited by a public officer so as to be misleading as to the true state of affairs." The ICAC Act prohibits the commission from compelling the production of cabinet-related material, so Riches had to close the investigation into that matter. The ICAC Act (Independent Commissioner Against Corruption Act 2018) was drafted and legislated by the Northern Territory Labor Government in November 2017.

== After politics ==
In November 2022, Gunner joined Fortescue Future Industries (FFI). He was promoted to lead FFI's Australia West division in April 2023. In February 2024, Gunner announced he had left his job at Fortescue. In 2025, Gunner was made a partner at consulting firm KPMG.

== Political positions ==
Gunner is a republican. He supports a woman's right to have an abortion.

== Personal life ==
On 3 December 2017, Gunner married ABC journalist Kristy O'Brien. It is his second marriage. The couple has two sons, born in 2020 and 2022.

In late January 2020, it was reported that Gunner would undergo heart surgery, after suffering a heart attack earlier in the month which had originally been described as a "minor heart scare".

Northern Territory Legislative Assembly
Preceded by Clare Martin	Member for Fannie Bay; 2008–2022	Succeeded by Brent Potter
Political offices
Preceded by Delia Lawrie	Leader of the Opposition; 2015–2016	Succeeded by Gary Higgins
Preceded by Adam Giles	Minister for Police, Fire and Emergency Services; 2016–2018	Succeeded by Nicole Manison
Preceded by Adam Giles as Minister for Indigenous Affairs	Minister for Aboriginal Affairs; 2016–2018	Succeeded by Ken Vowles
Preceded by Peter Styles as Minister for Business and Minister for Asian Engagement and Trade	Minister for Trade, Business and Innovation; 2016–2018	Succeeded by Himself as Minister for Trade and Major Projects
Preceded by Himself as Minister for Trade, Business and Innovation	Minister for Trade and Major Projects; 2018–2020	Succeeded by Himself as Minister for Major Projects
Preceded by Himself as Minister for Trade, Business and Innovation	Minister for Trade and Major Projects; 2018–2020	Succeeded by Nicole Manison as Minister for Northern Australia and Trade
Preceded by Adam Giles as Minister for Northern and Central Australia	Minister for Northern Australia; 2016–2020	Succeeded by Nicole Manison as Minister for Northern Australia and Trade
Preceded by Adam Giles	Chief Minister of the Northern Territory; 2016–2022	Succeeded by Natasha Fyles
Preceded by Nicole Manison	Treasurer of the Northern Territory; 2020–2022	Succeeded by Natasha Fyles
Party political offices
Preceded by Delia Lawrie	Leader of the Labor Party in the Northern Territory; 2015–2022	Succeeded by Natasha Fyles
