= Electoral division of Fannie Bay =

Coordinates: 12°25′30″S 130°50′11″E

Fannie Bay Northern Territory—Legislative Assembly
- Interactive map of boundaries as of the 2024 election
- Territory: Northern Territory
- Created: 1974
- MP: Laurie Zio
- Party: Country Liberal
- Namesake: Fannie Bay
- Electors: 6,126 (2026)
- Area: 11 km^{2} (4.2 sq mi)
- Demographic: Urban
Electorates around Fannie Bay:
Timor Sea	Timor Sea	Nightcliff
Timor Sea	Fannie Bay	Fong Lim
Timor Sea	Port Darwin	Fong Lim

Fannie Bay is an electoral division of the Legislative Assembly in Australia's Northern Territory. It is located in the inner northern suburbs of Darwin, with its current boundaries including the suburbs of Fannie Bay (from which it derives its name), Parap, East Point, The Narrows, The Gardens and parts of Stuart Park. It was first created in 1974, and is an entirely urban electorate, covering an area of 11 km². There were 6,126 people enrolled in the electorate as of July 2026.

== History ==
Fannie Bay has been an exception in Northern Territory politics, as it has tended to be neither marginal or safe for either party, with incumbent members of both parties having managed to easily hold the electorate for several years. This was illustrated in 1995, when Country Liberal Party incumbent Marshall Perron, the Territory's second longest-tenured head of government, retired from politics, only to be replaced by the Labor Party's Clare Martin. Six years later, Martin herself became Chief Minister while still representing the electorate. Martin resigned as Chief Minister in 2007, and retired at the 2008 election. Michael Gunner narrowly retained the seat for Labor, and went on to become Opposition Leader in 2015. He led Territory Labor to a record victory in 2016, becoming the third person to become Chief Minister while holding Fannie Bay.

On 27 July 2022, Michael Gunner announced his resignation from politics as the Member for Fannie Bay, triggering a by-election in the seat to be held on 20 August 2022. Brent Potter won the by-election. At the 2024 election, Potter was defeated by Country Liberal candidate Laurie Zio, having fallen to third place behind both Zio and Greens candidate Suki Dorras-Walker. However, he won the two-party-preferred count against Zio, meaning that, had 54 Greens voters instead first-preferenced Labor, Dorras-Walker would have placed third, and Potter would have been re-elected. This phenomenon has been nicknamed the Fannie Bay effect.

== Members for Fannie Bay ==
Member	Party	Term
Grant Tambling	Country Liberal	1974–1977
Pam O'Neil	Labor	1977–1983
Marshall Perron	Country Liberal	1983–1995
Clare Martin	Labor	1995–2008
Michael Gunner	Labor	2008–2022
Brent Potter	Labor	2022–2024
Laurie Zio	Country Liberal	2024–present

== Election results ==
2024 Northern Territory general election: Fannie Bay
Party	Candidate	Votes	%	±%
Country Liberal	Laurie Zio	1,858	39.9	+6.8
Greens	Suki Dorras-Walker	1,340	28.7	+17.6
Labor	Brent Potter	1,276	27.4	−21.1
Independent	Leonard May	187	4.0	+4.0
Total formal votes		4,661	97.8	N/A
Informal votes		104	2.2	N/A
Turnout		4,765	77.5	N/A
Two-party-preferred result (Note: Estimated two-party-preferred count by Antony Green.)
Labor	Brent Potter	2,442	52.4	−8.5
Country Liberal	Laurie Zio	2,219	47.6	+8.5
Two-candidate-preferred result
Country Liberal	Laurie Zio	2,349	50.4	+11.3
Greens	Suki Dorras-Walker	2,312	49.6	+49.6
Country Liberal gain from Labor		Swing	N/A	
