= Brian Owler =

Australian neurosurgeon

Brian Kenneth Owler AM is an Australian neurosurgeon who was elected as president of the Australian Medical Association in May 2014. Prior to taking the presidency of the AMA, Owler was president of the AMA (NSW).

== Early life and education ==
Owler grew up in Panania, and attended De La Salle College, Revesby Heights.

Owler was educated at the University of Sydney, studying for a Bachelor of Medicine, Bachelor of Surgery between 1990 and 1996. During this, he obtained a Bachelor of Science (Medicine), graduating with first-class Honours in 1993.

Owler later studied at the University of Sydney again for a Ph.D. in Surgery between 2000 and 2004. He gained his neurosurgery fellowship from the Royal Australian College of Surgeons in 2006.

== Career ==
=== AMA presidency ===
In his campaign to attain the presidency of the AMA, Owler advocated for a co-payment for visits to general practitioners in order to gain the support of general practice for his presidency and to provide "windfall profits" for medical practitioners. Following the strong opposition of the Australian Labor Party to the proposed changes to the remuneration of general practitioners, Owler publicly opposed the measures.

=== Academic career ===
Owler holds the position of Clinical Professor of Neurosurgery, Children's Hospital at Westmead Clinical School (also known as Royal Alexandra Hospital for Children), University of Sydney. He operates on paediatric and adult conditions in several Sydney hospitals, including Sydney Adventist Hospital and Macquarie University Hospital.

Owler is involved in several clinical studies including those on the topic of normal pressure hydrocephalus and deep brain stimulation surgery for the treatment of cerebral palsy. He has co-authored more than 40 academic papers. He has also written several opinion pieces for leading Australian papers and online media.

Owler is a driving force and the face of the NSW 'Don't Rush' anti-speeding campaign, and has appeared on billboards and in television ads warning of the risks and damage associated with road accidents. This advocacy arose from discussions with the relevant state minister while Owler was president of the NSW branch of the Australian Medical Association.

In 2015, The Medical Journal of Australia removed professor Stephen Leeder, formerly the journal's editor-in-chief after he criticised the decision to outsource production of the journal to the global publishing giant Elsevier. All but one of the AMJ's editorial advisory committee resigned following the decision to sack Leeder, and wrote to Owler asking him to review the decision.

In May 2015, Owler criticised a Federal Government plan to assist Curtin University open a medical school for undergraduates, arguing that medical students struggle to find internships or specialist training places.

In 2017, Owler chaired a Ministerial Advisory Panel that provided advice on the Victorian Voluntary Assisted Dying Bill 2017. The Bill was introduced into the Victorian Parliament on 20 September 2017.

=== Political career ===
On 30 October 2018, he became the Australian Labor Party's candidate for the Sydney seat of Bennelong for the 2019 Australian federal election. Owler was defeated in his attempt to win a seat in Federal Parliament.

== See also ==
- Sydney Medical School
