= Pam O'Neil =

Australian politician (born 1945)

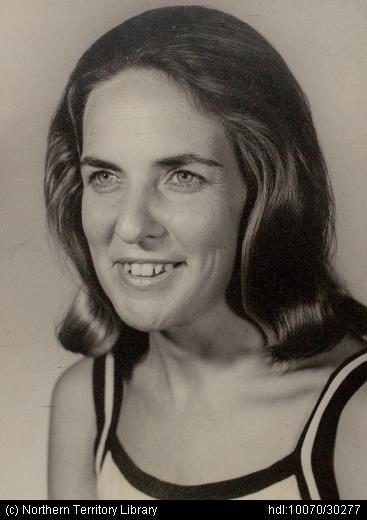
- O'Neil in 1977

Member of the Northern Territory Legislative Assembly for Fannie Bay
- In office 13 August 1977 – 2 December 1983
- Preceded by: Grant Tambling
- Succeeded by: Marshall Perron

Personal details
- Born: 20 September 1945 (age 80) Brisbane, Queensland, Australia
- Party: Labor Party
- Profession: Biochemist

Northern Territory Legislative Assembly
Years	Term	Electoral division	Party
1977–1980	2nd	Fannie Bay	Labor
1980–1983	3rd	Fannie Bay	Labor

Pamela Frances O'Neil (born 20 September 1945) is a former Australian politician. She was the Labor member for Fannie Bay in the Northern Territory Legislative Assembly from 1977 to 1983. In 1984, she was appointed Australia's first Sex Discrimination Commissioner by the Hawke Government, holding the position until 1988 when she was succeeded by Quentin Bryce.

Northern Territory Legislative Assembly
Preceded by Grant Tambling	Member for Fannie Bay; 1977–1983	Succeeded by Marshall Perron
Government offices
New title	Sex Discrimination Commissioner; 1984–1988	Succeeded by Quentin Bryce
