= Division of Bennelong =

Australian federal electoral division

Coordinates: 33.793°S 151.099°E

Bennelong Australian House of Representatives Division
- Interactive map of electorate boundaries from the 2025 federal election
- Created: 1949
- MP: Jerome Laxale
- Party: Labor
- Namesake: Woollarawarre Bennelong
- Electors: 125,986 (2025)
- Area: 60 km^{2} (23.2 sq mi)
- Demographic: Inner metropolitan
Electorates around Bennelong:
Berowra	Bradfield	Bradfield
Parramatta	Bennelong	Warringah
Reid	Reid	Sydney

Footnotes

The Division of Bennelong is an Australian electoral division in the state of New South Wales. The division was created in 1949 and is named after Woollarawarre Bennelong, an Aboriginal man befriended by the first Governor of New South Wales, Arthur Phillip. The seat has been represented by Jerome Laxale of the Labor Party since the 2022 federal election.

Bennelong covers 60 km^{2} of the Northern Sydney region, including all of the local government areas of Ryde, Lane Cove and Hunter's Hill, and parts of Willoughby and Parramatta.

It was represented from 1974 until 2007 by John Howard, who served as the Prime Minister of Australia from 1996 until 2007. As well as his government then being defeated, Howard also became the second sitting Australian Prime Minister to lose his own seat. Though historically a fairly safe Liberal seat, modern-day electoral boundaries and demographic changes have seen Bennelong become an increasingly marginal seat. The 2007 outcome in Bennelong resulted in Labor candidate Maxine McKew winning the seat on a thin 1.4-point margin after a close contest, making her the first Labor MP for Bennelong. After a single term McKew was defeated by Liberal candidate John Alexander in 2010, who retained it (not including a short vacancy in 2017) until the 2022 general election.

The seat was vacant from 11 November 2017 when Alexander resigned amid the 2017–18 Australian parliamentary eligibility crisis after confirming he was a dual citizen and therefore ineligible to sit in parliament. Despite a significant swing against him, Alexander was re-elected at the 2017 Bennelong by-election on 16 December. Alexander retired before the 2022 election, which was won by Laxale.

== Geography ==
Bennelong covers 60 km^{2} of the Northern Sydney region, including all of the local government areas of Ryde, Lane Cove and Hunter's Hill, and parts of Willoughby and Parramatta. It includes the suburbs of Denistone, Denistone East, Denistone West, East Ryde, Eastwood, Gladesville, Greenwich, Hunters Hill, Lane Cove, Lane Cove North, Lane Cove West, Linley Point, Longueville, Macquarie Park, Marsfield, Meadowbank, Melrose Park, North Ryde, Putney, Riverview, Ryde, Tennyson Point, West Ryde and Woolwich; as well as parts of Chatswood and Chatswood West.

Since 1984, federal electoral division boundaries in Australia have been determined at redistributions by a redistribution committee appointed by the Australian Electoral Commission. Redistributions occur for the boundaries of divisions in a particular state, and they occur every seven years, or sooner if a state's representation entitlement changes or when divisions of a state are malapportioned.

== Electoral history ==
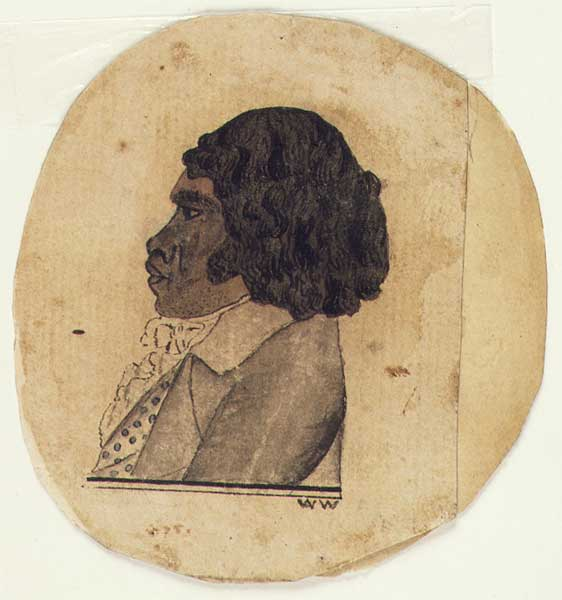
Woollarawarre Bennelong, the division's namesake

When the Division of Bennelong was created in 1949, it covered mainly the suburbs of Ryde, Hunters Hill and Lane Cove, all of which were (and still are) relatively affluent areas. It was originally created as a notionally marginal Liberal seat. However, the Liberal margin blew out in the Coalition's landslide victory that year, and for most of the next half-century it was a fairly safe to safe Liberal seat.

The seat's first member was Sir John Cramer, a minister in the Menzies government. In 1974, he handed the seat to John Howard, a minister in the Fraser government, and Leader of the Opposition from 1985 to 1989 and 1995 to 1996 before becoming Prime Minister of Australia from 1996 to 2007.

From 1949 to 1996, the Liberal hold on the seat was only seriously threatened four times; those were the only times that the seat was marginal against Labor. From 1998 onward, Bennelong became increasingly marginal, and this has been attributed to two factors. Firstly, the electoral boundary of Bennelong has been redrawn ("redistributed") numerous times, pushing it further westward into Labor-friendly territory near Parramatta. Successive redistributions eliminated Lane Cove and Hunters Hill in the east and incorporated Eastwood, Epping, Carlingford and middle-class Ermington in the north and west. Secondly, the demographic has changed as well: since the early 1990s, Eastwood and surrounding suburbs have seen an influx of migrants from China, Hong Kong, South Korea and India, who are relatively affluent and conservative, but are sensitive towards political policies on immigration and multiculturalism. The 2024 redistribution moved the electorate to the east so it now includes much of its original territory in Lane Cove.

=== 1998 election ===
In 1998, Prime Minister John Howard finished just short of a majority on the first count in the seat, and was only assured of re-election on the ninth count. He ultimately won a fairly comfortable 56 percent of the two-party-preferred vote.

=== 2004 election ===
In 2004, for the second time since becoming prime minister, Howard came up short of a majority in the first count for the seat. He was assured of re-election on the third count, ultimately winning 53.3 percent of the two-party-preferred vote. The two-party-preferred vote for the Liberals declined 3.4% in the 2004 election, contrary to a strong national trend to the Coalition (and a particularly strong one to the Coalition in outer-suburban metropolitan seats), making Bennelong a marginal seat at that time, with a margin of just 4.3 points. The Greens increased their vote at this election by 12.34% to 16.37% at this election, owing to the pre-selection of the high-profile Andrew Wilkie as candidate. There was also a campaign, led by John Valder, former President of the Liberal Party, and supported by Wilkie, to oppose the re-election of Howard as member for Bennelong in the 2004 Australian federal election, which, if it were successful, would have made him ineligible to be prime minister.

=== 2007 election ===
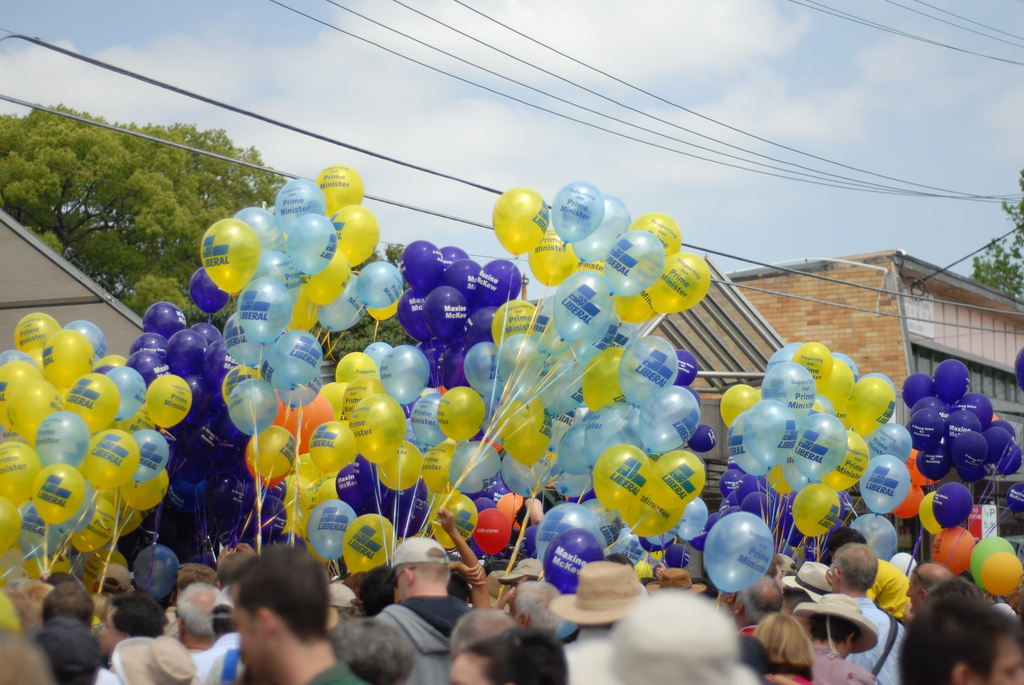
Balloons demonstrating the extent of the electioneering that occurred in Bennelong at the 2007 federal election

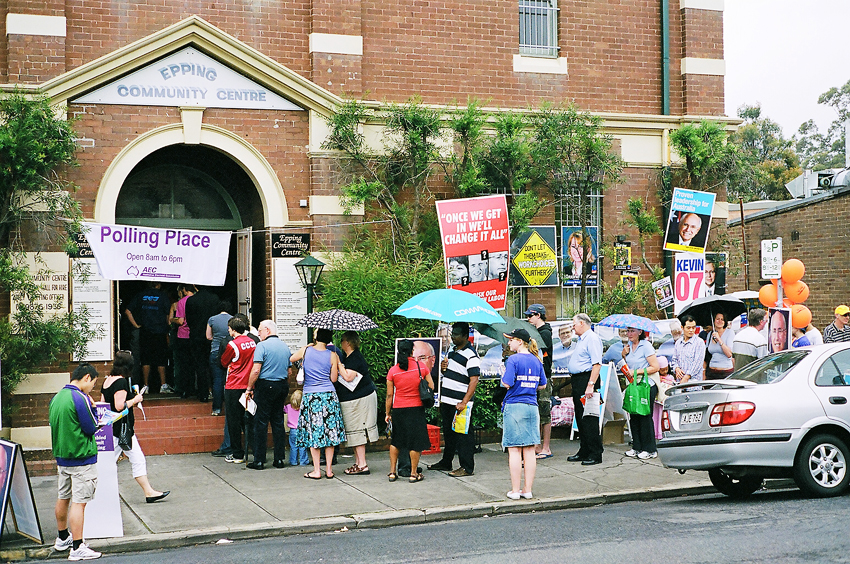
An Epping polling booth within Bennelong

In the 2007 election, the incumbent Member for Bennelong, then-Prime Minister John Howard, lost the seat to Labor candidate Maxine McKew, after holding it for 33 years. This was only the second time in Australian history that an incumbent prime minister had been defeated in his own electorate, the first being Stanley Bruce in 1929. The election marked the first time a Labor candidate won, and also the first time a woman won the seat.

After the 2004 election, Howard sat on a margin of four points, placing Bennelong just barely on the edge of seats that would fall to Labor in the event of a uniform swing that delivered it government. Though, the 2006 redistribution pushed this margin slightly further into Labor territory, due to the inclusion of the predominantly working-class and public-housing suburb of Ermington in Bennelong's boundaries.

As expected, the contest was very tight, and many media outlets listed Bennelong as a Labor gain on election night. In his nationwide speech conceding the election, Howard admitted it was "very likely" he had lost his own seat. Following initial reluctance to officially call the outcome (despite confidence of success), McKew declared victory officially on 1 December. At that time, the Australian Electoral Commission showed McKew ahead on a two-candidate-preferred basis, by 43,272 votes to 41,159; however, pre-poll, postal and absent votes were still being counted and could possibly have affected the outcome.

Howard formally conceded defeat in Bennelong on 12 December. The Electoral Commission declared the seat, with 44,685 votes for McKew to 42,251 for Howard. McKew led for most of the night, and ultimately won on the 14th count after over three-quarters of Green preferences flowed to her. Voter turnout in Bennelong was 95%.

=== 2010–17 ===
For the 2010 federal election, the Liberal Party pre-selected former tennis professional and tennis commentator John Alexander to contest the marginal seat. McKew recontested the seat for Labor. After a long and high-profile campaign, Alexander won the seat back from Labor; he increased both the Liberals' two-party-preferred and primary vote for the first time since 2001, and gained the largest swing towards the Liberals since 1996. Alexander defeated McKew with a two-party-preferred swing of 4.52 points (cf. the 2.58-point national swing in the 2010 federal election), contributing to the Gillard government's loss of its parliamentary majority.

McKew said Labor had failed to repeat the professional and targeted campaign of 2007. She also conceded that the removal of Kevin Rudd as Prime Minister had been a factor in the party's poor showing, along with the Government's dumping of the emissions trading scheme and a lacklustre national campaign.

Alexander picked up a four-percent swing in the 2013 federal election as the Coalition returned to government, returning Bennelong to its traditional status as a safe Liberal seat. He was reelected in 2016 with a small swing in his favour, even as the Coalition barely won a second term. On 11 November 2017, Alexander resigned his seat over questions of his eligibility to stand under section 44 of the Constitution, necessitating a by-election.

=== 2017 by-election ===
Amid the 2017–18 Australian parliamentary eligibility crisis, the trigger for the by-election was the resignation of Liberal incumbent John Alexander effective 11 November 2017. A few weeks following the increased clarity which came from the judgment of the High Court of Australia sitting as the Court of Disputed Returns on 27 October 2017 further determining dual citizenship ineligibility under Section 44 of the Constitution, Alexander resigned due to a belief that he may have held British citizenship at the time of his nomination and election, meaning he would be ineligible under Section 44 of the Constitution to sit in the Parliament of Australia. Alexander renounced any British citizenship he may have held, or otherwise been eligible for, in order to nominate for election again.

Alexander won the 2017 Bennelong by-election despite an approximate five percent two-party swing away to Labor candidate Kristina Keneally which made the seat marginal.

=== 2019 election ===
Alexander was not challenged for preselection for the 2019 federal election. With a margin of 9.7% from the 2016 election, Alexander competed against high profile neurosurgeon Brian Owler, who formerly chaired the Australian Medical Association and has worked closely with the NSW Government to be the face of a successful anti-speeding campaign for road safety. Owler's eminent persona was aided by several inflammatory remarks from Alexander, ultimately leading to a 2.8-point swing to Labor, which reduced the Liberal Party's hold on the seat to a margin of 6.9 points. Alexander, who was standing for the 5th time as candidate for Bennelong, is widely regarded to have built a strong personal vote in the seat. This has led to Bennelong having a relatively stable two-party-preferred result from the last three federal elections, in the Coalition's favour. Alexander declared victory shortly after counting had passed 50%.

=== 2022 election ===
On 12 November 2021 Alexander revealed that he would not contest the seat at the forthcoming federal election. ABC election analyst Antony Green pointed to the loss of Alexander's high personal vote as a vulnerability for the Coalition, giving the Labor Party a strong chance to reclaim the seat after McKew was unseated by Alexander in 2010. Former Ryde mayor and Labor candidate Jerome Laxale took the seat from the Liberals with a 7.9% swing in his favour, making him the second Labor member ever to win it. The loss of the seat has been attributed to the notably large swings against the Liberal Party among Chinese Australian voters which has cost the Liberal Party many key seats.

=== 2025 election ===
Prior to the 2025 federal election, a redistribution shifted Bennelong eastward away from Carlingford and Epping. In their place, Bennelong absorbed territory previously in the abolished seat of North Sydney, gaining Liberal-friendly suburbs such as Lane Cove, Riverview, Greenwich and Hunters Hill. Some of this area had been part of Bennelong until the 1990s. This made the seat notionally Liberal with a margin of 0.04 points. However, amid the Liberals' collapse in metropolitan Australia, Laxale was re-elected with a 9.3-point two-party swing towards him. This was easily the strongest result for Labor in the seat's history, and was just a few thousand votes short of making Bennelong a safe Labor seat, making Laxale the first Labor member to win a second term in Bennelong.

== Members ==
Image	Member	Party	Term	Notes
	Sir John Cramer (1896–1994)	Liberal	10 December 1949 – 11 April 1974	Served as minister under Menzies. Retired. Last person born before Federation to serve in the House of Representatives
	John Howard (1939–)	Liberal	18 May 1974 – 24 November 2007	Served as minister under Fraser. Served as Opposition Leader from 1985 to 1989, and from 1995 to 1996. Served as Prime Minister from 1996 to 2007. Lost seat
	Maxine McKew (1953–)	Labor	24 November 2007 – 21 August 2010	Lost seat
	John Alexander (1951–)	Liberal	21 August 2010 – 11 November 2017	Resigned due to dual citizenship. Subsequently re-elected. Retired
	John Alexander (1951–)	Liberal	16 December 2017 – 11 April 2022	Resigned due to dual citizenship. Subsequently re-elected. Retired
	Jerome Laxale (1983–)	Labor	21 May 2022 – present	Incumbent

== Election results ==
2025 Australian federal election: Bennelong
Party	Candidate	Votes	%	±%
Labor	Jerome Laxale	49,801	45.35	+13.26
Liberal	Scott Yung	38,510	35.07	−5.61
Greens	Adam Hart	12,931	11.78	+1.44
One Nation	Craig Bennett	2,534	2.31	+0.77
Family First	Eric Chan	1,934	1.76	+1.76
Fusion	John August	1,675	1.53	+0.12
Trumpet of Patriots	Robert Nalbandian	1,621	1.48	+1.48
HEART	Barry Devine	806	0.73	+0.56
Total formal votes		109,812	93.85	−0.51
Informal votes		7,196	6.15	+0.51
Turnout		117,008	92.90	+2.25
Two-party-preferred result
Labor	Jerome Laxale	65,076	59.26	+9.30
Liberal	Scott Yung	44,736	40.74	−9.30
Labor notional gain from Liberal		Swing	+9.30	

== Demographics ==
As of the 2021 Census significant statistics included a population of 191,219 with a median age of 37 years old with a median weekly household income of $2,124.

Further information can be found from recent Censuses, most recently the Australian Bureau of Statistics 2021 Census profile.

=== Cultural diversity ===
2021 Australian census
Ancestry
Response	Bennelong	NSW	Australia
Chinese	28.8%	7.2%	5.5%
English	16.2%	29.8%	33.0%
Australian	15.5%	28.6%	29.9%
Korean	6.1%	0.9%	0.5%
Irish	5.6%	9.1%	9.5%
Country of birth
Response	Bennelong	NSW	Australia
Australia	46.1%	65.4%	66.9%
China	13.7%	3.1%	2.2%
India	4.7%	2.6%	2.6%
South Korea	4.6%	0.7%	0.4%
Hong Kong	3.3%	0.6%	0.4%
Philippines	1.9%	1.3%	1.2%
Religious affiliation
Response	Bennelong	NSW	Australia
No religion	37.1%	32.8%	38.4%
Catholicism	20.8%	22.4%	20.0%
Anglican	6.8%	11.9%	9.8%
Hinduism	5.1%	3.4%	2.7%
Language spoken at home
English	43.6%	67.6%	72.0%
Mandarin	15.3%	3.4%	2.7%
Cantonese	8.4%	1.8%	1.2%
Korean	5.7%	0.8%	0.5%
Hindi	1.9%	1.0%	0.8%
Arabic	1.6%	2.8%	1.4%
