= Brent Potter =

Australian politician

Member of the Northern Territory Legislative Assembly for Fannie Bay
- In office 20 August 2022 – 24 August 2024
- Preceded by: Michael Gunner
- Succeeded by: Laurie Zio

Personal details
- Born: Brent Potter
- Party: Labor
- Children: Four
- Education: University of New South Wales

Military service
- Allegiance: Australia
- Branch/service: Australian Army
- Unit: NORFORCE

Brent Potter is an Australian politician who represented the Fannie Bay in the Northern Territory Legislative Assembly from a 2022 by-election on 20 August 2022 until his defeat at the 2024 election.

== Career ==
Before his political career, Potter worked in the Australian Army, during which he was deployed to Afghanistan. He also worked in aged care, defence manufacturing, business development, and as a policy advisor to Natasha Fyles, the Northern Territory's Chief Minister from 13 May 2022 until her resignation in 2023. Potter has lived in Darwin since 2009. He has a Master's of Business from the University of New South Wales.

== Political career ==
Former Chief Minister of the Northern Territory Michael Gunner resigned from his seat of Fannie Bay in the Legislative Assembly on 27 July 2022, triggering the 2022 Fannie Bay by-election. The Labor Party revealed Potter as its candidate on 30 July. Potter's now deactivated LinkedIn page showed he had previously worked for an aerospace company which he had helped secure $10 million in public funds from the government.

At the by-election on 20 August, he was elected, withstanding a swing against him.

Potter enacted the 2024 Alice Springs curfews and supported the subsequent curfew legislation.

== Controversies ==
=== Offensive social media posts on Facebook ===
In March 2024, it was reported in the media that Potter had made racist and antisemitic social media posts and jokes on Facebook over the past 11 years, which he apologised for and has since deleted. Potter has since called out racism in the Northern Territory Police Force.

In the posts, Potter reportedly shared offensive memes, quoted Nazis, praised Vladimir Putin and casually used the word "nigger". Potter apologised for the posts and said they were satirical and did not represent his views.

== Personal life ==
Potter has four children.

Northern Territory Legislative Assembly
Preceded by Michael Gunner	Member for Fannie Bay; 2022–2024	Succeeded by Laurie Zio
