= Australian Affordable Housing Party =

- Leader: Andrew Potts
- President: Anthony Ziebell
- Founded: 2016; 10 years ago
- Headquarters: Ashfield
- Ideology: Affordable housing

Website
- www.affordable-housing-party.org

The Australian Affordable Housing Party is an Australian political party registered with the Australian Electoral Commission for federal elections in Australia. Its first election contest was in the 2017 Bennelong by-election.

The party's registration was announced to the public as an exclusive by news.com.au journalist Benedict Brook on 24 August 2017.

The party's leader and lead Senate candidate for NSW is Andrew Potts, a former newspaper editor and opinion columnist and the executive and associate producer of two Australian feature films, The Dream Children (2015) and Mongolian Bling (2012).

The party's president and second announced Senate candidate for NSW is Anthony Ziebell, a tenants rights activist and owner of the website DontRentMe.com - a service which allows renters to review bad landlords and property managers. Ziebell has appeared on several episodes of Channel 9's A Current Affair program and has been interviewed by a large range of other media.

After the High Court ruled that the Nationals MP and Deputy Prime Minister Barnaby Joyce was ineligible to have been elected to the Australian Parliament, the New England byelection was called. The party announced that Potts would stand for the seat. He secured the number three spot on the ballot paper for the election in which seventeen candidates were running, outpolling six other candidates and finishing just 23 votes behind the Sustainable Australia candidate.

The party announced on 16 November that Ziebell would contest the Bennelong byelection after sitting member John Alexander resigned his seat, fearing that the High Court might also find him ineligible. Twelve candidates contested the election and Ziebell outpolled four of those candidates.

== Registration ==
It was registered with effect from 24 January 2017. The party had been refused registration by a delegate of the Electoral Commission, but this was overturned by the full Commission on 9 August 2017. The issue of concern had been whether the party had been able to satisfy the Electoral Commission that it had at least 500 electors in its membership. This was achieved following random sampling of the membership list submitted during March and April 2017.

== Policies ==
The party's policies include:

- Phasing out negative gearing and capital gains discount on investment property sales
- Stopping overseas buyers from buying Australian properties
- Taxing properties left empty by investors
- Reducing Australia's population growth to where it was under the Hawke and Keating Labor governments
- Banning full-time Airbnb properties
- Ending "no fault" evictions for rental properties

== See also ==
- List of political parties in Australia
