= Laurie Zio =

Australian politician

Laurie Zio MLA

Member of the Northern Territory Legislative Assembly for Fannie Bay
- Incumbent
- Assumed office 24 August 2024
- Preceded by: Brent Potter

Personal details
- Party: Country Liberal Party

Laurie Zio is an Australian politician from the Country Liberal Party.

She moved to the Northern Territory at the age of 14. She has worked in the education sector since 2008.

In the 2024 Northern Territory general election, she was elected to the Northern Territory Legislative Assembly for Fannie Bay.

Northern Territory Legislative Assembly
Preceded by Brent Potter	Member for Fannie Bay; 2024–present	Incumbent
