= Non-Custodial Parents Party (Equal Parenting) =

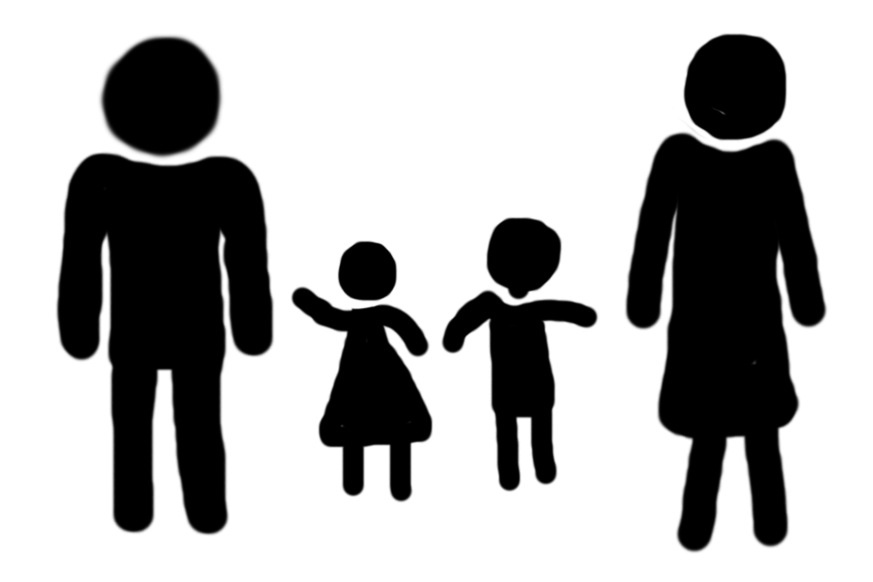
- Leader: Andrew Thompson
- Founded: 1998; 28 years ago
- Dissolved: 27 May 2020; 5 years ago
- Headquarters: New South Wales
- Ideology: Fathers' rights
- Political position: Centre-right

Website
- www.equalparenting.org.au

The Non-Custodial Parents Party (Equal Parenting) (originally known as the Non-Custodial Parents Party) was a minor political party in Australia registered between 1999 and 2020. It supported less government control of many aspects of daily family life, focusing on reform of family law and child support.

The party's core policies centred on the issue of family law reform, emphasising legislative changes in order to ensure children maintain a relationship with both parents. The policies focused on assisting non-custodial parents, grandparents and spouses of non-custodial parents, particularly those not granted contact with their children.

== History ==
The Non-Custodial Parents Party was formed in Australia in 1998 by Andrew Thompson and other concerned citizens. The NCPP ran 20 candidates for the New South Wales Legislative Assembly and two candidates for the New South Wales Legislative Council in the 1999 state election.

The NCPP contested six seats and the Senate in New South Wales for the 2001 Australian federal election. A NCPP candidate, John Flanagan, contested the 2002 Cunningham by-election and received 556 votes, representing 0.83% of the total vote.

In the 2004 federal election, the NCPP fielded candidates in states other than in New South Wales for the first time. The party ran for the Senate in New South Wales, Victoria, Queensland and Western Australia, and nationally received a total of 12,207 votes, representing 0.10% of the national vote. The party also contested two seats in the House of Representatives, Cunningham and Parramatta, receiving 1,132 votes total.

The party was automatically de-registered in 2006, along with all non-parliamentary political parties, as a result of the Electoral and Referendum Amendment (Electoral Integrity and Other Measures) Act 2006. The NCPP successfully re-applied for registration under the name Non-Custodial Parents Party (Equal Parenting).

In the 2007 federal election, the NCPP again contested four states in the Senate, and ran in Cunningham and Macarthur in the House. The Senate candidates received 6,385 first preference votes, or 0.05% of the total vote, while the House of Representatives candidates received 795 first preferences votes representing 0.01% of the national vote

At the 2010 Federal Election, the NCPP contested the Senate only in New South Wales, winning 0.09% of the total New South Wales votes. and 0.03% of the national vote. The party also ran candidates in Cunningham and Throsby, receiving 2,835 votes.

The NCPP ran for the Senate in New South Wales at the 2013 federal election, and also ran in three House of Representatives seats: Cunningham, Throsby, and Flinders in Victoria. The party ran again in Cunningham and Whitlam (formerly Throsby), and for the Senate in New South Wales, in 2016.

The party nominated Anthony Fels, a former member of the WA Legislative Council, for the 2017 Bennelong by-election. Fels came last of 12 candidates with a primary vote of less than 0.2 percent.

At the 2019 federal election, the party ran only in Cunningham, receiving 1,213 votes.

The NCPP voluntarily de-registered in May 2020.

== See also ==
- Child custody
- Equal Parenting Alliance: political party
- Fathers 4 Justice
- Families Need Fathers
- Family law
- Fathers' rights
- Shared parenting
