= Stella Maris, Darwin =

Heritage site in Darwin, Australia

Coordinates: 12°27′55″S 130°50′50″E

Stella Maris is a heritage site on McMinn Street in Darwin, Northern Territory, Australia.

== History ==
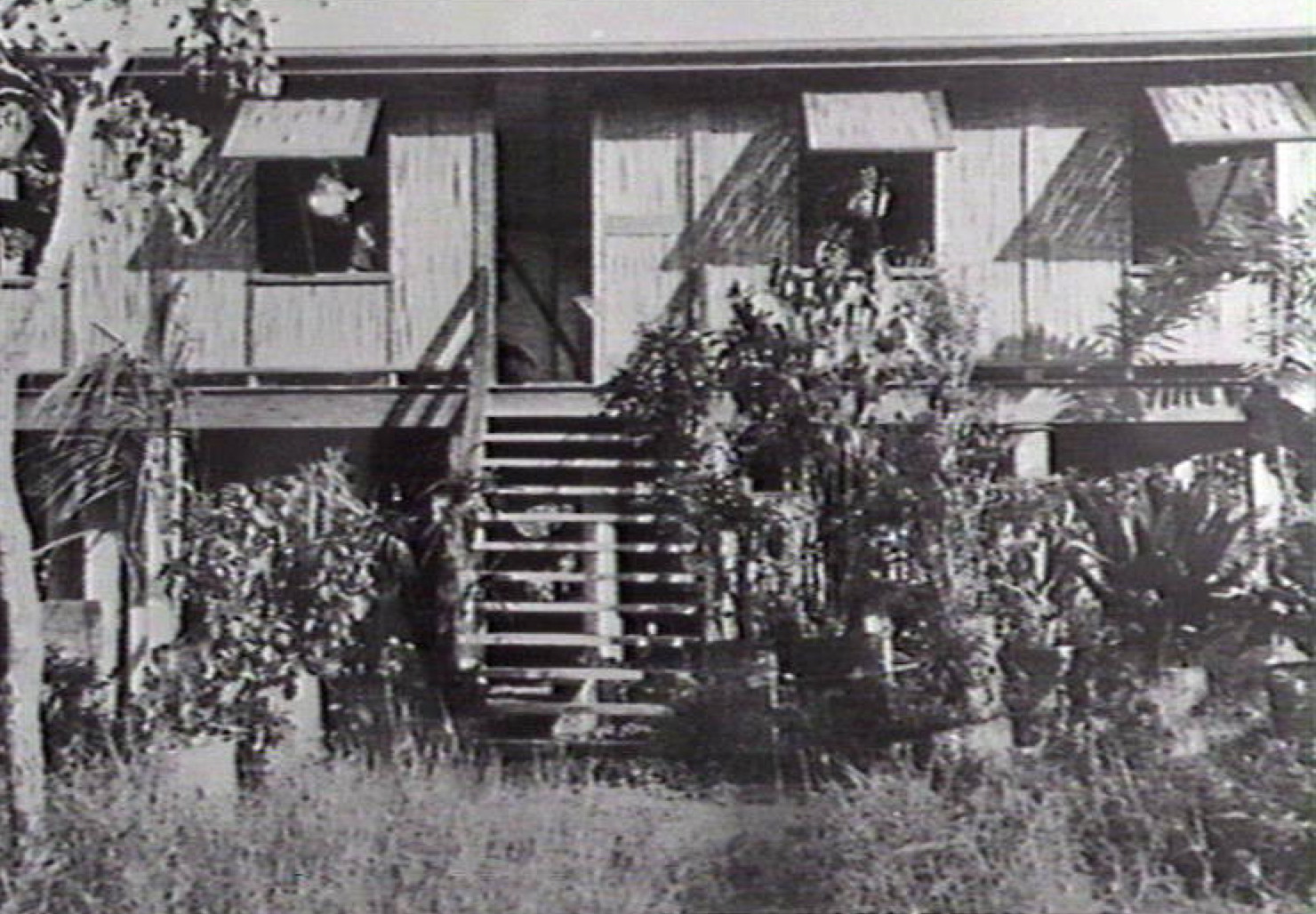
"An old railway house on the way to the wharf", 1936

The Stella Maris site is located on McMinn Street in Darwin and consists of three main buildings.

The oldest building was constructed 1930s by the Commonwealth Railways. While the exact date of its construction is not known, a 1936 map of central Darwin shows two adjacent buildings marked as 'Commonwealth Railways'. The remaining building on site was one of these. The other is thought to have been demolished in the early 1940s. The building may be featured in a photograph dated 1936, entitled “an old railway house on the way to the wharf” although it has not been verified that it is the same building. The fact that the building was described as ‘old’ in 1936 suggests the possibility that it may have been built much earlier.

Upon the closure of the North Australia Railway in 1976, many of its buildings were sold or demolished. The site was handed to the City of Darwin Council by the Australian National Railways Commission. It was then leased to Roman Catholic Stella Maris organisation in 1979 to be operated as a licensed club.

In 1995, the council recommended that the Stella Maris Hostel be registered as a heritage site. The bid was unsuccessful. The site was re-nominated for heritage listing in 2003. It was accepted on 10 June 2004.

At the rear of the site are two other buildings constructed in the 1990s. Neither is considered historically significant.

== Controversy ==
The site, which is valued at about $3 million, was leased rent-free to Unions NT by the Northern Territory Government on 2 August 2012. This was one day prior to the day the former Labor government entered caretaker mode prior to the 2012 election. In December 2013, the former Northern Territory Lands Minister Gerry McCarthy claimed there was "no reasonable prospect of finding any other organisation which was prepared to devote the time and resources to get Stella Maris back to life. Unions NT was the only organisation to take any real interest in the heritage values of the site." It was later revealed that several other organisations had expressed interest in the site, including the National Trust of Australia.

An inquiry into the leasing of Stella Maris was opened on 5 December 2013. John Lawler AM APM, the former chief executive officer of the Australian Crime Commission, was appointed as the commissioner of the inquiry. During the 18-day inquiry, McCarthy claimed to have attended a cabinet meeting when the deal was discussed in 2012. Phone records later proved he was in fact in Elliott at the time of the meeting and could not have been present.

The final report was tabled in the Northern Territory Legislative Assembly on 19 June 2014. The report found the process followed by the then Labor Government was not transparent. It requested Unions NT immediately relinquish any interest in the site and that a formal expression of interest process reopened. It also found the conduct of the then Northern Territory Treasurer Delia Lawrie and McCarthy in relation to the lease was "not accountable or responsible".

Lawrie claimed she had been denied procedural fairness, and took the case to the Northern Territory Supreme Court. Justice Stephen Southwood dismissed her case on 1 April 2015. Attorney-general John Elferink then referred Lawrie to the Northern Territory Police for investigation of "possible breaches of the criminal law". Lawrie then launched a second appeal, this time into Justice Southwood's decision. In June 2016, Justices John Doyle and Kevin Duggan from South Australia, and Justice Eric Heenan from Western Australia upheld the decision by Justice Southwood that Mr Lawler had conducted the inquiry in a manner that was fair to Lawrie.

== Current use ==
On 4 March 2016, the Northern Territory Government announced that it had granted a ten-year lease to the National Trust of Australia (Northern Territory) for use of the site as a museum and cafe. As of April 2025, the site still sits vacant and unused.
