= Electoral results for the district of Ryde =

Election results for Ryde, New South Wales, Australia

Ryde, an electoral district of the Legislative Assembly in the Australian state of New South Wales, has had four incarnations since it was first established in 1894. It has returned one member for most of its existence, except for the period 1920 to 1927 when it returned five members.

== Members ==
First incarnation (1894–1907)
Election	Member	Party								
1894	Frank Farnell	Free Trade								
1895	Frank Farnell	Free Trade								
1898	Edward Terry	Ind. Protectionist								
1901	Frank Farnell	Independent Liberal								
1904 by	Edward Terry	Independent Liberal								
Second incarnation (1913–1968)
Election	Member	Party								
1913	William Thompson	Liberal Reform								
1917	William Thompson	Nationalist	Member	Party	Member	Party	Member	Party	Member	Party
1920	Edward Loxton	Ind. Nationalist	David Anderson	Nationalist	Thomas Bavin	Progressive	Sir Thomas Henley	Nationalist	Robert Greig	Labor
1922	Edward Loxton	Nationalist	David Anderson	Nationalist	Thomas Bavin	Nationalist	Sir Thomas Henley	Nationalist	Robert Greig	Labor
1925	Edward Sanders	Nationalist	David Anderson	Nationalist	Thomas Bavin	Nationalist	Sir Thomas Henley	Nationalist	Robert Greig	Labor
1927	Henry McDicken	Labor								
1930	Evan Davies	Labor								
1932	Eric Spooner	United Australia								
1935	Eric Spooner	United Australia								
1938	Eric Spooner	United Australia								
1940 by	Arthur Williams	Labor								
1941	James Shand	Ind. United Australia								
1944	James Shand	Ind. United Australia								
1945 by	Eric Hearnshaw	Liberal								
1947	Eric Hearnshaw	Liberal								
1950	Ken Anderson	Liberal								
1953	Frank Downing	Labor								
1956	Frank Downing	Labor								
1959	Frank Downing	Labor								
1962	Frank Downing	Labor								
1965	Frank Downing	Labor								
Third incarnation (1981–1991)
Election	Member	Party								
1981	Garry McIlwaine	Labor								
1984	Garry McIlwaine	Labor								
1988	Michael Photios	Liberal								
Fourth incarnation (1999–present)
Election	Member	Party								
1999	John Watkins	Labor								
2003	John Watkins	Labor								
2007	John Watkins	Labor								
2008	Victor Dominello	Liberal								
2011	Victor Dominello	Liberal								
2018	Victor Dominello	Liberal								
2019	Victor Dominello	Liberal								
2023	Jordan Lane	Liberal								

== Election results ==
=== Elections in the 2020s ===
==== 2023 ====
2023 New South Wales state election: Ryde
Party	Candidate	Votes	%	±%
Liberal	Jordan Lane	24,383	45.3	−4.4
Labor	Lyndal Howison	21,004	39.0	+8.6
Greens	Sophie Edington	5,772	10.7	+2.0
Sustainable Australia	Bradley Jelfs	1,357	2.5	+0.9
Informed Medical Options	Barry Devine	1,324	2.5	+2.5
Total formal votes		53,840	97.4	+0.1
Informal votes		1,441	2.6	−0.1
Turnout		55,281	89.4	+0.8
Two-party-preferred result
Liberal	Jordan Lane	25,431	50.1	−8.9
Labor	Lyndal Howison	25,377	49.9	+8.9
Liberal hold		Swing	−8.9	

=== Elections in the 2010s ===
==== 2019 ====
2019 New South Wales state election: Ryde
Party	Candidate	Votes	%	±%
Liberal	Victor Dominello	24,045	49.59	−4.15
Labor	Jerome Laxale	14,750	30.42	+1.52
Greens	Lindsay Peters	4,206	8.67	−2.81
Christian Democrats	Julie Worsley	2,058	4.24	+0.03
Keep Sydney Open	Sophie Khatchigian	1,336	2.76	+2.76
Conservatives	Steve Busch	850	1.75	+1.75
Sustainable Australia	Mark Larsen	835	1.72	+1.72
Liberal Democrats	Christopher De Bruyne	412	0.85	+0.85
Total formal votes		48,492	97.29	+0.33
Informal votes		1,351	2.71	−0.33
Turnout		49,843	90.82	−0.51
Two-party-preferred result
Liberal	Victor Dominello	26,032	58.96	−2.55
Labor	Jerome Laxale	18,123	41.04	+2.55
Liberal hold		Swing	−2.55	

==== 2015 ====
2015 New South Wales state election: Ryde
Party	Candidate	Votes	%	±%
Liberal	Victor Dominello	25,950	53.7	−8.5
Labor	Jerome Laxale	13,958	28.9	+11.7
Greens	Justin Alick	5,548	11.5	+1.9
Christian Democrats	Julie Worsley	2,034	4.2	+0.1
No Land Tax	Joe Cacciotti	806	1.7	+1.7
Total formal votes		48,296	97.0	+0.1
Informal votes		1,512	3.0	−0.1
Turnout		49,808	91.3	+2.8
Two-party-preferred result
Liberal	Victor Dominello	27,516	61.5	−13.7
Labor	Jerome Laxale	17,215	38.5	+13.7
Liberal hold		Swing	−13.7	

==== 2011 ====
2011 New South Wales state election: Ryde
Party	Candidate	Votes	%	±%
Liberal	Victor Dominello	27,247	62.8	+34.2
Labor	Jerome Laxale	7,374	17.0	−27.8
Greens	Jimmy Shaw	3,969	9.1	+1.3
Independent	Vic Tagg	3,043	7.0	+7.0
Christian Democrats	Julie Worsley	1,774	4.1	+0.4
Total formal votes		43,407	97.2	−0.2
Informal votes		1,236	2.8	+0.2
Turnout		44,643	92.7	
Two-party-preferred result
Liberal	Victor Dominello	29,578	75.7	+35.8
Labor	Jerome Laxale	9,498	24.3	−35.8
Liberal hold		Swing	+12.7	

=== Elections in the 2000s ===
==== 2008 by-election ====
2008 Ryde by-election
Party	Candidate	Votes	%	±%
Liberal	Victor Dominello	21,370	54.34	+25.74
Labor	Nicole Campbell	11,725	29.81	−15.03
Greens	Lindsay Peters	4,407	11.21	+3.34
Independent	Victor Taffa	1,171	2.98	+2.98
Democrats	Peter Goldfinch	656	1.67	+0.27
Total formal votes		39,329	97.96	+0.53
Informal votes		820	2.04	−0.53
Turnout		40,149	83.64	−9.33
Two-party-preferred result
Liberal	Victor Dominello	22,556	63.01	+23.10
Labor	Nicole Campbell	13,243	36.99	−23.10
Liberal gain from Labor		Swing	+23.10	

==== 2007 ====
2007 New South Wales state election: Ryde
Party	Candidate	Votes	%	±%
Labor	John Watkins	18,780	44.8	−8.9
Liberal	Vic Tagg	11,979	28.6	−2.1
Independent	Ivan Petch	3,539	8.4	+8.4
Greens	Peter Bell	3,297	7.9	+0.6
Christian Democrats	Robyn Peebles	1,532	3.7	+0.9
Unity	Kevin Chin	1,510	3.6	+0.0
AAFI	Furgen Gruener	660	1.6	+1.5
Democrats	Peter Goldfinch	588	1.4	−0.4
Total formal votes		41,885	97.4	−0.3
Informal votes		1,103	2.6	+0.3
Turnout		42,988	93.0	
Two-party-preferred result
Labor	John Watkins	22,060	60.1	−4.7
Liberal	Vic Tagg	14,654	39.9	+4.7
Labor hold		Swing	−4.7	

==== 2003 ====
2003 New South Wales state election: Ryde
Party	Candidate	Votes	%	±%
Labor	John Watkins	22,499	54.8	+10.7
Liberal	Paul Nicolaou	12,500	30.4	−3.2
Greens	Jimmy Shaw	2,934	7.1	+4.4
Unity	Lawrence Chan	1,400	3.4	+0.3
Christian Democrats	David Collins	1,030	2.5	+2.5
Democrats	Chris Owens	731	1.8	−2.0
Total formal votes		41,094	97.7	+0.5
Informal votes		946	2.3	−0.5
Turnout		42,040	92.4	
Two-party-preferred result
Labor	John Watkins	25,278	65.5	+8.9
Liberal	Paul Nicolaou	13,289	34.5	−8.9
Labor hold		Swing	+8.9	

=== Elections in the 1990s ===
==== 1999 ====
1999 New South Wales state election: Ryde
Party	Candidate	Votes	%	±%
Labor	John Watkins	18,169	44.1	+7.4
Liberal	Michael Photios	13,853	33.6	−13.2
Independent	Ivan Petch	3,494	8.5	+8.5
Democrats	Noel Plumb	1,551	3.8	−2.1
Unity	Ning Gao	1,260	3.1	+3.1
Greens	Jimmy Shaw	1,098	2.7	+1.2
One Nation	Gordon King	1,023	2.5	+2.5
AAFI	Fiona Paton	276	0.7	−1.6
Outdoor Recreation	Jennifer Mathews	232	0.6	+0.6
Independent	Iris Knight	184	0.4	−1.1
People First	Rod Salmon	80	0.2	+0.2
Total formal votes		41,220	97.3	+2.0
Informal votes		1,151	2.7	−2.0
Turnout		42,371	93.4	
Two-party-preferred result
Labor	John Watkins	20,813	56.6	+10.8
Liberal	Michael Photios	15,961	43.4	−10.8
Labor notional gain from Liberal		Swing	+10.8	

District recreated

==== 1991–1999 ====
District abolished

=== Elections in the 1980s ===
==== 1988 ====
1988 New South Wales state election: Ryde
Party	Candidate	Votes	%	±%
Labor	Garry McIlwaine	13,253	46.1	−5.3
Liberal	Michael Photios	13,183	45.9	+5.5
Democrats	Robert Springett	2,311	8.0	+0.7
Total formal votes		28,747	97.0	−0.1
Informal votes		876	3.0	+0.1
Turnout		29,623	93.3	
Two-party-preferred result
Liberal	Michael Photios	14,189	50.2	+5.3
Labor	Garry McIlwaine	14,092	49.8	−5.3
Liberal gain from Labor		Swing	+5.3	

==== 1984 ====
1984 New South Wales state election: Ryde
Party	Candidate	Votes	%	±%
Labor	Garry McIlwaine	14,059	51.5	−5.5
Liberal	Ian Kortlang	11,163	40.9	+3.7
Democrats	Peter Chambers	2,093	7.7	+1.9
Total formal votes		27,315	97.1	+0.7
Informal votes		816	2.9	−0.7
Turnout		28,131	92.8	+2.2
Two-party-preferred result
Labor	Garry McIlwaine		54.9	−5.4
Liberal	Ian Kortlang		45.1	+5.4
Labor hold		Swing	−5.4	

==== 1981 ====
1981 New South Wales state election: Ryde
Party	Candidate	Votes	%	±%
Labor	Garry McIlwaine	15,570	57.0	
Liberal	Donald Wilkinson	10,160	37.2	
Democrats	Christopher Dunkerley	1,588	5.8	
Total formal votes		27,318	96.4	
Informal votes		1,032	3.6	
Turnout		28,350	90.6	
Two-party-preferred result
Labor	Garry McIlwaine	15,870	60.3	−3.4
Liberal	Donald Wilkinson	10,460	39.7	+3.4
Labor notional hold		Swing	−3.4	

District recreated

==== 1968–1981 ====
District abolished

=== Elections in the 1960s ===
==== 1965 ====
1965 New South Wales state election: Ryde
Party	Candidate	Votes	%	±%
Labor	Frank Downing	14,386	52.1	−7.9
Liberal	Henry Mitchell	12,297	44.5	+4.5
Democratic Labor	Thomas Kennedy	948	3.4	+3.4
Total formal votes		27,631	98.3	−0.5
Informal votes		465	1.7	+0.5
Turnout		28,096	95.3	0.0
Two-party-preferred result
Labor	Frank Downing	14,576	52.8	−7.2
Liberal	Henry Mitchell	13,055	47.2	+7.2
Labor hold		Swing	−7.2	

==== 1962 ====
1962 New South Wales state election: Ryde
Party	Candidate	Votes	%	±%
Labor	Frank Downing	15,827	60.0	+8.5
Liberal	Edward Hall	10,555	40.0	−5.0
Total formal votes		26,382	98.8	
Informal votes		318	1.2	
Turnout		26,700	95.3	
Labor hold		Swing	+7.8	

=== Elections in the 1950s ===
==== 1959 ====
1959 New South Wales state election: Ryde
Party	Candidate	Votes	%	±%
Labor	Frank Downing	13,454	51.5	
Liberal	Ian Millar	11,768	45.0	
Democratic Labor	Francis Bull	925	3.5	
Total formal votes		26,147	98.7	
Informal votes		352	1.3	
Turnout		26,499	95.7	
Two-party-preferred result
Labor	Frank Downing	13,639	52.2	
Liberal	Ian Millar	12,508	47.8	
Labor hold		Swing		

==== 1956 ====
1956 New South Wales state election: Ryde
Party	Candidate	Votes	%	±%
Labor	Frank Downing	12,001	50.1	−4.4
Liberal	Francis Collings	11,959	49.9	+4.4
Total formal votes		23,960	98.2	+0.1
Informal votes		436	1.8	−0.1
Turnout		24,396	94.6	−0.6
Labor hold		Swing	−4.4	

==== 1953 ====
1953 New South Wales state election: Ryde
Party	Candidate	Votes	%	±%
Labor	Frank Downing	12,121	54.5	
Liberal	Ken Anderson	10,114	45.5	
Total formal votes		22,235	98.1	
Informal votes		428	1.9	
Turnout		22,663	95.2	
Labor gain from Liberal		Swing		

==== 1950 ====
1950 New South Wales state election: Ryde
Party	Candidate	Votes	%	±%
Liberal	Ken Anderson	11,077	51.1	
Labor	Frank Downing	10,598	48.9	
Total formal votes		21,675	98.2	
Informal votes		400	1.8	
Turnout		22,075	94.1	
Liberal hold		Swing		

=== Elections in the 1940s ===
==== 1947 ====
1947 New South Wales state election: Ryde
Party	Candidate	Votes	%	±%
Liberal	Eric Hearnshaw	15,670	62.9	+43.9
Independent	Robert O'Neile	9,238	37.1	+37.1
Total formal votes		24,908	98.1	+2.0
Informal votes		494	1.9	−2.0
Turnout		25,402	94.3	+1.9
Liberal hold		Swing	N/A	

==== 1945 by-election ====
1945 Ryde by-election Saturday 3 February
Party	Candidate	Votes	%	±%
Liberal	Eric Hearnshaw	7,630	38.6	+19.6
Labor	William Browne	5,591	28.3	+2.2
Independent	George Vaughan	2,690	13.6	
Independent	William Irvine	1,853	9.4	
Independent	Leonard McKay	998	5.1	
Independent	Henry Brierly	512	2.6	
Social Credit	Howard Miscamble	382	1.9	+0.5
Fair Deal	John Price	102	0.5	
Total formal votes		19,758	94.6	−1.5
Informal votes		1,127	5.4	+1.5
Turnout		20,885	83.9	−8.5
Two-party-preferred result
Liberal	Eric Hearnshaw	11,339	57.4	
Labor	William Browne	8,419	42.6	
Liberal gain from Independent		Swing	N/A	

James Shand (Independent Democrat) died.

==== 1944 ====
1944 New South Wales state election: Ryde
Party	Candidate	Votes	%	±%
Independent Democrat	James Shand	6,151	28.4	−18.1
Labor	Joseph Griffiths	5,645	26.1	+26.1
Democratic	Leslie Billington	4,103	19.0	−7.5
Liberal Democratic	Ernest Mead	3,039	14.0	+14.0
Lang Labor	Frederick Burke	2,409	11.1	+11.1
Independent	Howard Miscamble	292	1.4	+0.1
Total formal votes		21,639	96.1	−1.8
Informal votes		880	3.9	+1.8
Turnout		22,519	92.4	−0.9
Two-candidate-preferred result
Independent Democrat	James Shand	12,873	59.5	−9.5
Labor	Joseph Griffiths	8,766	40.5	+40.5
Independent Democrat hold		Swing	N/A	

==== 1941 ====
1941 New South Wales state election: Ryde
Party	Candidate	Votes	%	±%
Ind. United Australia	James Shand	9,825	46.5	
United Australia	Eric Solomon	5,588	26.5	
Independent	William Elliott	5,434	25.7	
Independent	Howard Miscamble	266	1.3	
Total formal votes		21,113	97.9	
Informal votes		444	2.1	
Turnout		21,557	93.3	
Two-candidate-preferred result
Ind. United Australia	James Shand	14,564	69.0	
United Australia	Eric Solomon	6,549	31.0	
Ind. United Australia gain from United Australia		Swing		

Arthur Williams (Labor) won the seat at the 1940 by-election, but after the re-distribution, chose to contest Georges River instead and Labor did not field a candidate. Eric Solomon was the United Australia member for the abolished seat of Petersham. James Shand was the United Australia member for the abolished seat of Hornsby and had been denied pre-selection.

==== 1940 by-election ====
1940 Ryde by-election Saturday 14 September
Party	Candidate	Votes	%	±%
Labor	Arthur Williams	7,680	35.6	+9.3
United Australia	Herbert Mitchell	7,742	35.9	−17.4
Independent	William Harrison	3,048	14.1	−6.3
State Labor	James Stewart	1,685	7.8	
Independent	Bert Cowell	1,431	6.6	
Total formal votes		21,586	96.6	−2.1
Informal votes		755	3.4	+2.1
Turnout		22,341	89.7	−7.3
Two-party-preferred result
Labor	Arthur Williams	10,908	50.5	
United Australia	Herbert Mitchell	10,678	49.5	
Labor gain from United Australia		Swing	N/A	

Eric Spooner (United Australia) resigned to successfully contest the 1940 election for Robertson.

=== Elections in the 1930s ===
==== 1938 ====
1938 New South Wales state election: Ryde
Party	Candidate	Votes	%	±%
United Australia	Eric Spooner	11,669	53.3	−6.0
Labor	James Walsh	5,746	26.3	−14.4
Independent	William Harrison	4,478	20.4	+20.4
Total formal votes		21,893	98.7	+0.6
Informal votes		294	1.3	−0.6
Turnout		22,187	97.0	−0.5
United Australia hold		Swing	N/A	

- Preferences were not distributed.

==== 1935 ====
1935 New South Wales state election: Ryde
Party	Candidate	Votes	%	±%
United Australia	Eric Spooner	11,983	59.3	+2.3
Labor (NSW)	Evan Davies	8,208	40.7	+3.5
Total formal votes		20,191	98.1	−0.4
Informal votes		395	1.9	+0.4
Turnout		20,586	97.5	+0.1
United Australia hold		Swing	N/A	

==== 1932 ====
1932 New South Wales state election: Ryde
Party	Candidate	Votes	%	±%
United Australia	Eric Spooner	11,072	57.0	+22.0
Labor (NSW)	Evan Davies	7,236	37.2	−12.8
Federal Labor	May Matthews	905	4.7	+4.7
Communist	Richard Barron	218	1.1	+0.6
Total formal votes		19,431	98.5	+1.2
Informal votes		296	1.5	−1.2
Turnout		19,727	97.4	+1.2
United Australia gain from Labor (NSW)		Swing	N/A	

- Preferences were not distributed.

==== 1930 ====
1930 New South Wales state election: Ryde
Party	Candidate	Votes	%	±%
Labor	Evan Davies	9,162	50.0	
Nationalist	David Anderson (defeated)	6,410	35.0	
Australian	William Macduff	2,604	14.2	
Communist	Basil Williams	96	0.5	
Independent	William Featherstone	50	0.3	
Total formal votes		18,322	97.3	
Informal votes		513	2.7	
Turnout		18,835	96.2	
Labor gain from Nationalist		Swing		

=== Elections in the 1920s ===
==== 1927 ====
1927 New South Wales state election: Ryde
Party	Candidate	Votes	%	±%
Labor	Henry McDicken	7,363	51.4	
Nationalist	Arthur Bridges	6,507	45.4	
Independent	Francis Pacey	463	3.2	
Total formal votes		14,333	98.5	
Informal votes		211	1.5	
Turnout		14,544	87.1	
Labor win		(new seat)		

==== 1925 ====
1925 New South Wales state election: Ryde
Party	Candidate	Votes	%	±%
Quota		10,908		
Nationalist	Thomas Henley (elected 1)	16,512	25.2	−3.0
Nationalist	Thomas Bavin (elected 2)	11,844	18.1	+9.4
Nationalist	David Anderson (elected 3)	8,312	12.7	−0.9
Nationalist	Edward Sanders (elected 5)	2,206	3.4	+3.4
Nationalist	Herbert Small	1,955	3.0	−0.6
Labor	Robert Greig (elected 4)	8,894	13.6	−0.9
Labor	Stan Taylor	6,154	9.4	+9.4
Labor	James Concannon	2,867	4.4	+4.4
Labor	William McCristal	903	1.4	+1.4
Labor	Edward Lamont	620	1.0	+1.0
Protestant Labour	James Chamberlain	1,189	1.8	+1.8
Protestant Labour	William Featherstone	882	1.4	+1.4
Ind. Nationalist	Cecil Brierley	1,679	2.6	+2.6
Progressive	Crawford Vaughan	805	1.2	+1.2
Progressive	Ernest Thompson	461	0.7	−0.9
Independent	John Pattison	163	0.3	+0.3
Total formal votes		65,446	97.2	+0.1
Informal votes		1,869	2.8	−0.1
Turnout		67,315	70.4	−3.9
Party total votes
Nationalist		40,829	62.4	−9.7
Labor		19,438	29.7	+4.1
Protestant Labour		2,071	3.2	+3.2
Ind. Nationalist	Cecil Brierley	1,679	2.6	+2.6
Progressive		1,266	1.9	+0.3
Independent	John Pattison	163	0.3	+0.3

==== 1922 ====
1922 New South Wales state election: Ryde
Party	Candidate	Votes	%	±%
Quota		9,454		
Nationalist	Thomas Henley (elected 1)	16,007	28.2	+5.9
Nationalist	David Anderson (elected 2)	7,732	13.6	+5.2
Nationalist	Edward Loxton (elected 3)	6,866	12.1	−4.5
Nationalist	Thomas Bavin (elected 5)	4,946	8.7	+8.7
Nationalist	Norman McIntosh	3,260	5.7	+5.7
Nationalist	Herbert Small	2,066	3.6	+3.6
Labor	Robert Greig (elected 4)	8,238	14.5	+5.9
Labor	William Hutchison	4,969	8.8	−0.5
Labor	John English	574	1.0	+1.0
Labor	Thomas Maher	401	0.7	+0.7
Labor	Alexander Mackie	323	0.6	+0.6
Progressive	Ernest Thompson	923	1.6	+1.6
Independent	John Pattison	415	0.7	+0.7
Total formal votes		56,720	97.1	+8.1
Informal votes		1,664	2.9	−8.1
Turnout		58,384	74.3	+17.1
Party total votes
Nationalist		40,877	72.1	+32.6
Labor		14,505	25.6	−2.8
Progressive	Ernest Thompson	923	1.6	−10.2
Independent	John Pattison	415	0.7	+0.7

==== 1920 ====
1920 New South Wales state election: Ryde
Party	Candidate	Votes	%	±%
Quota		5,344		
Nationalist	Thomas Henley (elected 1)	7,150	22.3	
Nationalist	David Anderson (elected 3)	2,697	8.4	
Nationalist	Sydney Herring	1,915	6.0	
Nationalist	Herbert Small	898	2.8	
Labor	William Hutchison	2,987	9.3	
Labor	Robert Greig (elected 5)	2,866	8.9	
Labor	Henry Douglass	1,648	5.1	
Labor	Vernon Jarvis	1,013	3.2	
Labor	Ernest Sheiles	597	1.9	
Ind. Nationalist	Edward Loxton (elected 2)	5,319	16.6	
Progressive	Thomas Bavin (elected 4)	2,525	7.9	
Progressive	Benjamin Gelling	1,246	3.9	
Soldiers & Citizens	Maurice Dearn	354	1.1	
Soldiers & Citizens	Charles Laseron	241	0.8	
Soldiers & Citizens	David Morgan	198	0.6	
Soldiers & Citizens	John Pattison	149	0.5	
Soldiers & Citizens	Francis Russell	143	0.5	
Independent	Henry Bernard	93	0.3	
Independent	Robin Levick	22	0.1	
Total formal votes		32,061	89.0	
Informal votes		3,976	11.0	
Turnout		36,037	57.2	
Party total votes
Nationalist		12,660	39.5	
Labor		9,111	28.4	
Ind. Nationalist	Edward Loxton	5,319	16.6	
Progressive		3,771	11.8	
Soldiers & Citizens		1,085	3.4	
Independent	Henry Bernard	93	0.3	
Independent	Robin Levick	22	0.1	

=== Elections in the 1910s ===
==== 1917 ====
1917 New South Wales state election: Ryde
Party	Candidate	Votes	%	±%
Nationalist	William Thompson	6,834	65.0	+0.4
Labor	William Hutchison	2,610	24.8	−6.5
Independent	Norman McIntosh	1,067	10.2	+10.2
Total formal votes		10,511	99.3	+1.6
Informal votes		73	0.7	−1.6
Turnout		10,584	60.0	−10.6
Nationalist hold		Swing	+0.4	

==== 1913 ====
1913 New South Wales state election: Ryde
Party	Candidate	Votes	%	±%
Liberal Reform	William Thompson	6,055	64.6	
Labor	Murdock MacLeod	2,938	31.3	
National Progressive	Charles Summerhayes	385	4.1	
Total formal votes		9,378	97.7	
Informal votes		219	2.3	
Turnout		9,597	70.6	
Liberal Reform win		(new seat)		

District recreated

==== 1904–1913 ====
District abolished

=== Elections in the 1900s ===
==== 1904 by-election ====
1904 Ryde by-election Saturday 24 May
Party	Candidate	Votes	%	±%
Independent Liberal	Edward Terry (elected)	1,136	51.2	
Liberal Reform	Thomas Henley	1,082	48.8	+19.5
Total formal votes		2,218	99.0	−0.2
Informal votes		22	1.0	+0.2
Turnout		2,240	75.1 (Note: Estimate based on a roll of 3,107 at the 1901 election.)	−0.5
Independent Liberal hold				

Frank Farnell (Independent Liberal) resigned.

==== 1901 ====
1901 New South Wales state election: Ryde
Party	Candidate	Votes	%	±%
Independent Liberal	Frank Farnell	1,039	44.6	+1.5
Liberal Reform	Thomas Henley	684	29.3	
Independent	Edward Terry	604	25.9	−24.4
Ind. Progressive	Henry Tucker	4	0.2	
Total formal votes		1,167	99.2	−0.3
Informal votes		10	0.9	+0.3
Turnout		1,177	53.0	−16.1
Independent Liberal gain from Ind. Progressive				

=== Elections in the 1890s ===
==== 1898 ====
1898 New South Wales colonial election: Ryde
Party	Candidate	Votes	%	±%
Independent Federalist	Edward Terry	919	50.3	
Free Trade	Frank Farnell	787	43.1	
Ind. Free Trade	Edward Foxall	121	6.6	
Total formal votes		1,827	99.5	
Informal votes		10	0.5	
Turnout		1,837	69.1	
Independent Federalist gain from Free Trade				

==== 1895 ====
1895 New South Wales colonial election: Ryde
Party	Candidate	Votes	%	±%
Free Trade	Frank Farnell	801	58.0	
Ind. Free Trade	Edward Terry	580	42.0	
Total formal votes		1,381	99.6	
Informal votes		5	0.4	
Turnout		1,386	64.7	
Free Trade hold				

==== 1894 ====
1894 New South Wales colonial election: Ryde
Party	Candidate	Votes	%	±%
Free Trade	Frank Farnell	927	54.8	
Ind. Free Trade	Edward Terry	370	21.9	
Independent Labour	John Lennon	216	12.8	
Ind. Free Trade	John Forsythe	137	8.1	
Independent Labour	John Rees	43	2.5	
Total formal votes		1,693	99.0	
Informal votes		17	1.0	
Turnout		1,710	78.4	
Free Trade win		(new seat)		
