= Electoral results for the district of Georges River =

Election results for Georges River, New South Wales, Australia

Georges River, an electoral district of the Legislative Assembly in the Australian state of New South Wales was created in 1930 and abolished in 2007.

Election	Member	Party
1930	Ted Kinsella	Labor
1932	Cecil Monro	United Australia
1935	Cecil Monro	United Australia
1938	Cecil Monro	United Australia
1941	Arthur Williams	Labor
1944	Arthur Williams	Labor
1947	Arthur Williams	Labor
1950	Arthur Williams	Labor
1953	Frank O'Neill	Labor
1956	Douglas Cross	Liberal
1959	Douglas Cross	Liberal
1962	Douglas Cross	Liberal
1965	Douglas Cross	Liberal
1968	Douglas Cross	Liberal
1970 by	Frank Walker	Labor
1973	Frank Walker	Labor
1976	Frank Walker	Labor
1978	Frank Walker	Labor
1981	Frank Walker	Labor
1984	Frank Walker	Labor
1988	Terry Griffiths	Liberal
1991	Terry Griffiths	Liberal / Independent
1995	Marie Ficarra	Liberal
1999	Kevin Greene	Labor
2003	Kevin Greene	Labor

== Election results ==
=== Elections in the 2000s ===
==== 2003 ====
2003 New South Wales state election: Georges River
Party	Candidate	Votes	%	±%
Labor	Kevin Greene	21,840	52.4	+5.3
Liberal	Joanne McCafferty	13,148	31.5	−5.4
Greens	Christine Welsh	2,504	6.0	+3.0
Unity	John Lau	1,872	4.5	+2.5
Independent	Michele Adair	1,246	3.0	+3.0
Against Further Immigration	Francis Bush	577	1.4	−0.6
One Nation	Mary Kennedy	529	1.3	−4.0
Total formal votes		24,628	97.7	−0.1
Informal votes		1,002	2.3	+0.1
Turnout		42,718	92.7	
Two-party-preferred result
Labor	Kevin Greene	24,628	63.7	+7.4
Liberal	Joanne McCafferty	14,054	36.3	−7.4
Labor hold		Swing	+7.4	

=== Elections in the 1990s ===
==== 1999 ====
1999 New South Wales state election: Georges River
Party	Candidate	Votes	%	±%
Labor	Kevin Greene	19,548	47.1	+6.5
Liberal	Marie Ficarra	15,285	36.9	−8.9
One Nation	Andy Konnecke	2,193	5.3	+5.3
Greens	John Kaye	1,237	3.0	+3.0
Against Further Immigration	Brian McFarlane	850	2.0	−2.8
Unity	Paul Celik	847	2.0	+2.0
Independent	Deirdrei Bedwell	838	2.0	+2.0
Independent	Annie Tang	678	1.6	+1.6
Total formal votes		41,476	97.7	+2.7
Informal votes		972	2.3	−2.7
Turnout		42,448	93.7	
Two-party-preferred result
Labor	Kevin Greene	21,559	56.3	+8.3
Liberal	Marie Ficarra	16,763	43.7	−8.3
Labor gain from Liberal		Swing	+8.3	

==== 1995 ====
1995 New South Wales state election: Georges River
Party	Candidate	Votes	%	±%
Liberal	Marie Ficarra	16,527	49.6	−2.9
Labor	Philip Sansom	11,070	33.2	+1.9
Independent	Milo Dunphy	2,370	7.1	+7.1
Against Further Immigration	John Justice	2,249	6.8	+6.8
Call to Australia	Chris McLean	1,096	3.3	+3.3
Total formal votes		33,312	95.7	+2.4
Informal votes		1,500	4.3	−2.4
Turnout		34,812	94.7	
Two-party-preferred result
Liberal	Marie Ficarra	18,175	58.0	−3.4
Labor	Philip Sansom	13,156	42.0	+3.4
Liberal hold		Swing	−3.4	

==== 1991 ====
1991 New South Wales state election: Georges River
Party	Candidate	Votes	%	±%
Liberal	Terry Griffiths	16,966	52.5	+0.8
Labor	Philip Sansom	10,117	31.3	−3.0
Independent	Bill Pickering	1,716	5.3	−2.7
Independent	Ross Green	1,318	4.1	+4.1
Democrats	Paul Kekel	1,038	3.2	+3.2
Independent	Fred Cavanagh	1,010	3.1	+3.1
Independent	Brian Meyer	121	0.4	−0.2
Total formal votes		32,286	93.3	−4.5
Informal votes		2,304	6.7	+4.5
Turnout		34,590	94.4	
Two-party-preferred result
Liberal	Terry Griffiths	18,226	61.4	+1.3
Labor	Philip Sansom	11,468	38.6	−1.3
Liberal hold		Swing	+1.3	

=== Elections in the 1980s ===
==== 1988 ====
1988 New South Wales state election: Georges River
Party	Candidate	Votes	%	±%
Labor	Frank Walker	12,615	41.9	−14.1
Liberal	Terry Griffiths	12,018	39.9	−4.2
Independent	William Pickering	4,162	13.8	+13.8
Independent	Beverley Giergerl	1,051	3.5	+3.5
Independent	Brian Meyer	287	1.0	+1.0
Total formal votes		30,133	97.4	−0.1
Informal votes		820	2.6	+0.1
Turnout		30,953	96.5	
Two-party-preferred result
Liberal	Terry Griffiths	15,087	52.1	+8.0
Labor	Frank Walker	13,883	47.9	−8.0
Liberal gain from Labor		Swing	+8.0	

==== 1984 ====
1984 New South Wales state election: Georges River
Party	Candidate	Votes	%	±%
Labor	Frank Walker	15,792	55.0	−5.9
Liberal	Warren Griffin	12,920	45.0	+18.0
Total formal votes		28,712	97.7	+0.3
Informal votes		686	2.3	−0.3
Turnout		29,398	94.9	+1.4
Labor hold		Swing	−14.0	

==== 1981 ====
1981 New South Wales state election: Georges River
Party	Candidate	Votes	%	±%
Labor	Frank Walker	17,368	60.9	−4.3
Liberal	Terence Morgan	7,692	27.0	−4.1
Independent	Phillip Gerlach	2,162	7.6	+7.6
Independent	Bruce Galloway	775	2.7	+2.7
Democrats	Wallace Burak	418	1.5	−2.2
Independent	Eric Stavely-Alexander	106	0.4	+0.4
Total formal votes		28,521	97.4	
Informal votes		752	2.6	
Turnout		29,273	93.5	
Two-party-preferred result
Labor	Frank Walker	17,568	69.0	+2.0
Liberal	Terence Morgan	7,892	31.0	−2.0
Labor hold		Swing	+2.0	

=== Elections in the 1970s ===
==== 1978 ====
1978 New South Wales state election: Georges River
Party	Candidate	Votes	%	±%
Labor	Frank Walker	20,626	65.2	+12.4
Liberal	John Lyon	9,847	31.1	−16.1
Democrats	Montague Greene	1,156	3.7	+3.7
Total formal votes		31,629	98.4	−0.2
Informal votes		514	1.6	+0.2
Turnout		32,143	94.4	−1.1
Two-party-preferred result
Labor	Frank Walker	21,204	67.0	+14.2
Liberal	John Lyon	10,425	33.0	−14.2
Labor hold		Swing	+14.2	

==== 1976 ====
1976 New South Wales state election: Georges River
Party	Candidate	Votes	%	±%
Labor	Frank Walker	16,929	52.8	+7.4
Liberal	Maxwell Gibson	15,111	47.2	+2.8
Total formal votes		32,040	98.6	+0.7
Informal votes		448	1.4	−0.7
Turnout		32,488	95.5	+0.2
Labor hold		Swing	+2.1	

==== 1973 ====
1973 New South Wales state election: Georges River
Party	Candidate	Votes	%	±%
Labor	Frank Walker	13,533	45.4	−6.0
Liberal	Roderick MacKenzie	13,241	44.4	−4.2
Australia	Peter Eden	1,614	5.4	+5.4
Democratic Labor	Charles Kane	845	2.8	+2.8
Independent	Kenneth Cavanough	555	1.9	+1.9
Total formal votes		29,7888	97.9	
Informal votes		631	2.1	
Turnout		30,419	95.3	
Two-party-preferred result
Labor	Frank Walker	15,103	50.7	−0.7
Liberal	Roderick MacKenzie	14,685	49.3	+0.7
Labor hold		Swing	−0.7	

==== 1971 ====
1971 New South Wales state election: Georges River
Party	Candidate	Votes	%	±%
Labor	Frank Walker	13,319	51.4	+7.6
Liberal	Vince Bruce	12,573	48.6	−7.6
Total formal votes		25,892	98.5	
Informal votes		382	1.5	
Turnout		26,274	95.7	
Labor gain from Liberal		Swing	+7.6	

==== 1970 by-election ====
1970 Georges River by-election Saturday 19 September
Party	Candidate	Votes	%	±%
Labor	Frank Walker	12,104	47.8	+6.5
Liberal	John Tonkin	10,208	40.3	−18.4
Defence of Government Schools	Robin Alleway	1,847	7.3	
Democratic Labor	B Payne	1,040	4.1	
Independent	William Leo Hutchinson	118	0.5	
Total formal votes		25,317	98.0	+0.8
Informal votes		514	2.0	−0.5
Turnout		25,831	86.0	−9.3
Two-party-preferred result
Labor	Frank Walker	13,256	52.4	+11.1
Liberal	John Tonkin	12,061	47.6	−11.1
Labor gain from Liberal		Swing	11.1	

Douglas Cross (Liberal) died.

=== Elections in the 1960s ===
==== 1968 ====
1968 New South Wales state election: Georges River
Party	Candidate	Votes	%	±%
Liberal	Douglas Cross	16,036	58.7	+2.3
Labor	Ernest Curlisa	11,285	41.3	−2.3
Total formal votes		27,321	97.5	
Informal votes		687	2.5	
Turnout		28,008	95.3	
Liberal hold		Swing	+2.3	

==== 1965 ====
1965 New South Wales state election: Georges River
Party	Candidate	Votes	%	±%
Liberal	Douglas Cross	16,497	58.3	+5.7
Labor	William Robinson	11,802	41.7	−4.3
Total formal votes		28,299	98.3	−0.5
Informal votes		476	1.7	+0.5
Turnout		28,775	95.4	−0.2
Liberal hold		Swing	+5.0	

==== 1962 ====
1962 New South Wales state election: Georges River
Party	Candidate	Votes	%	±%
Liberal	Douglas Cross	14,063	52.6	+0.3
Labor	Albert Kealman	12,297	46.0	+1.5
Independent	Fitzgerald Mulholland	395	1.5	+0.1
Total formal votes		26,755	98.8	
Informal votes		323	1.2	
Turnout		27,078	95.6	
Two-party-preferred result
Liberal	Douglas Cross	14,261	53.3	−1.2
Labor	Albert Kealman	12,494	46.7	+1.2
Liberal hold		Swing	−1.2	

=== Elections in the 1950s ===
==== 1959 ====
1959 New South Wales state election: Georges River
Party	Candidate	Votes	%	±%
Liberal	Douglas Cross	12,919	52.3	
Labor	Albert Kealman	10,989	44.5	
Democratic Labor	Kevin Davis	470	1.9	
Independent	Fitzgerald Mulholland	336	1.4	
Total formal votes		24,714	98.5	
Informal votes		382	1.5	
Turnout		25,096	95.4	
Two-party-preferred result
Liberal	Douglas Cross	13,463	54.5	
Labor	Albert Kealman	11,251	45.5	
Liberal hold		Swing		

==== 1956 ====
1956 New South Wales state election: Georges River
Party	Candidate	Votes	%	±%
Liberal	Douglas Cross	12,852	52.4	+11.0
Labor	Frank O'Neill	10,765	43.9	−14.7
Communist	Paul Mortier	907	3.7	+3.7
Total formal votes		24,524	98.5	+0.5
Informal votes		365	1.5	−0.5
Turnout		24,889	94.7	+0.1
Two-party-preferred result
Liberal	Douglas Cross	12,943	52.8	+11.4
Labor	Frank O'Neill	11,581	47.2	−11.4
Liberal gain from Labor		Swing	+11.4	

==== 1953 ====
1953 New South Wales state election: Georges River
Party	Candidate	Votes	%	±%
Labor	Frank O'Neill	12,310	58.6	
Liberal	Samuel Warren	8,711	41.4	
Total formal votes		21,021	98.0	
Informal votes		428	2.0	
Turnout		21,449	94.6	
Labor hold		Swing		

==== 1950 ====
1950 New South Wales state election: Georges River
Party	Candidate	Votes	%	±%
Labor	Arthur Williams	12,225	54.7	
Liberal	Charles Little	10,146	45.3	
Total formal votes		22,371	98.5	
Informal votes		349	1.5	
Turnout		22,720	94.5	
Labor hold		Swing		

=== Elections in the 1940s ===
==== 1947 ====
1947 New South Wales state election: Georges River
Party	Candidate	Votes	%	±%
Labor	Arthur Williams	15,645	52.4	−9.6
Liberal	Ray Watson	14,236	47.6	+9.6
Total formal votes		29,881	98.6	+2.1
Informal votes		438	1.4	−2.1
Turnout		30,319	95.2	+3.0
Labor hold		Swing	−9.6	

==== 1944 ====
1944 New South Wales state election: Georges River
Party	Candidate	Votes	%	±%
Labor	Arthur Williams	14,582	62.0	+4.5
Democratic	Hedley Mallard	8,953	38.0	−4.5
Total formal votes		23,535	96.5	−1.7
Informal votes		843	3.5	+1.7
Turnout		24,378	92.2	−1.9
Labor hold		Swing	+4.5	

==== 1941 ====
1941 New South Wales state election: Georges River
Party	Candidate	Votes	%	±%
Labor	Arthur Williams	12,417	57.5	
United Australia	Cecil Monro	9,190	42.5	
Total formal votes		21,607	98.2	
Informal votes		383	1.8	
Turnout		22,000	94.1	
Labor gain from United Australia		Swing		

=== Elections in the 1930s ===
==== 1938 ====
1938 New South Wales state election: Georges River
Party	Candidate	Votes	%	±%
United Australia	Cecil Monro	13,222	57.4	+5.7
Labor	Albert Kealman	9,811	42.6	−2.1
Total formal votes		23,033	97.3	−0.2
Informal votes		633	2.7	+0.2
Turnout		23,666	96.3	−0.3
United Australia hold		Swing	N/A	

==== 1935 ====
1935 New South Wales state election: Georges River
Party	Candidate	Votes	%	±%
United Australia	Cecil Monro	10,770	51.7	−4.0
Labor (NSW)	Ted Kinsella	9,315	44.7	+6.1
Centre	James Fowler	762	3.7	+3.7
Total formal votes		20,847	97.5	−1.0
Informal votes		527	2.5	+1.0
Turnout		21,374	96.6	−0.4
United Australia hold		Swing	N/A	

- Preferences were not distributed.

==== 1932 ====
1932 New South Wales state election: Georges River
Party	Candidate	Votes	%	±%
United Australia	Cecil Monro	10,906	55.7	+18.3
Labor (NSW)	Ted Kinsella	7,546	38.6	−14.5
Federal Labor	John Keegan	902	4.6	+4.6
Communist	Patrick Drew	214	1.1	+0.3
Total formal votes		19,568	98.5	+0.3
Informal votes		294	1.5	−0.3
Turnout		19,862	97.0	+1.2
United Australia gain from Labor (NSW)		Swing	N/A	

- Preferences were not distributed.

==== 1930 ====
1930 New South Wales state election: Georges River
Party	Candidate	Votes	%	±%
Labor	Ted Kinsella	9,668	53.1	
Nationalist	Cecil Monro	6,814	37.4	
Australian	Hedley Mallard	1,569	8.6	
Communist	Patrick Drew	147	0.8	
Total formal votes		18,198	98.2	
Informal votes		333	1.8	
Turnout		18,531	95.8	
Labor win		(new seat)		
