= 1930 New South Wales state election =

State election for New South Wales, Australia in October 1930

- 25 October 1930

All 90 seats in the New South Wales Legislative Assembly 46 Assembly seats were needed for a majority
- Registered: 1,440,785
- Turnout: 1,325,945 (94.94%) (▲12.4 pp)
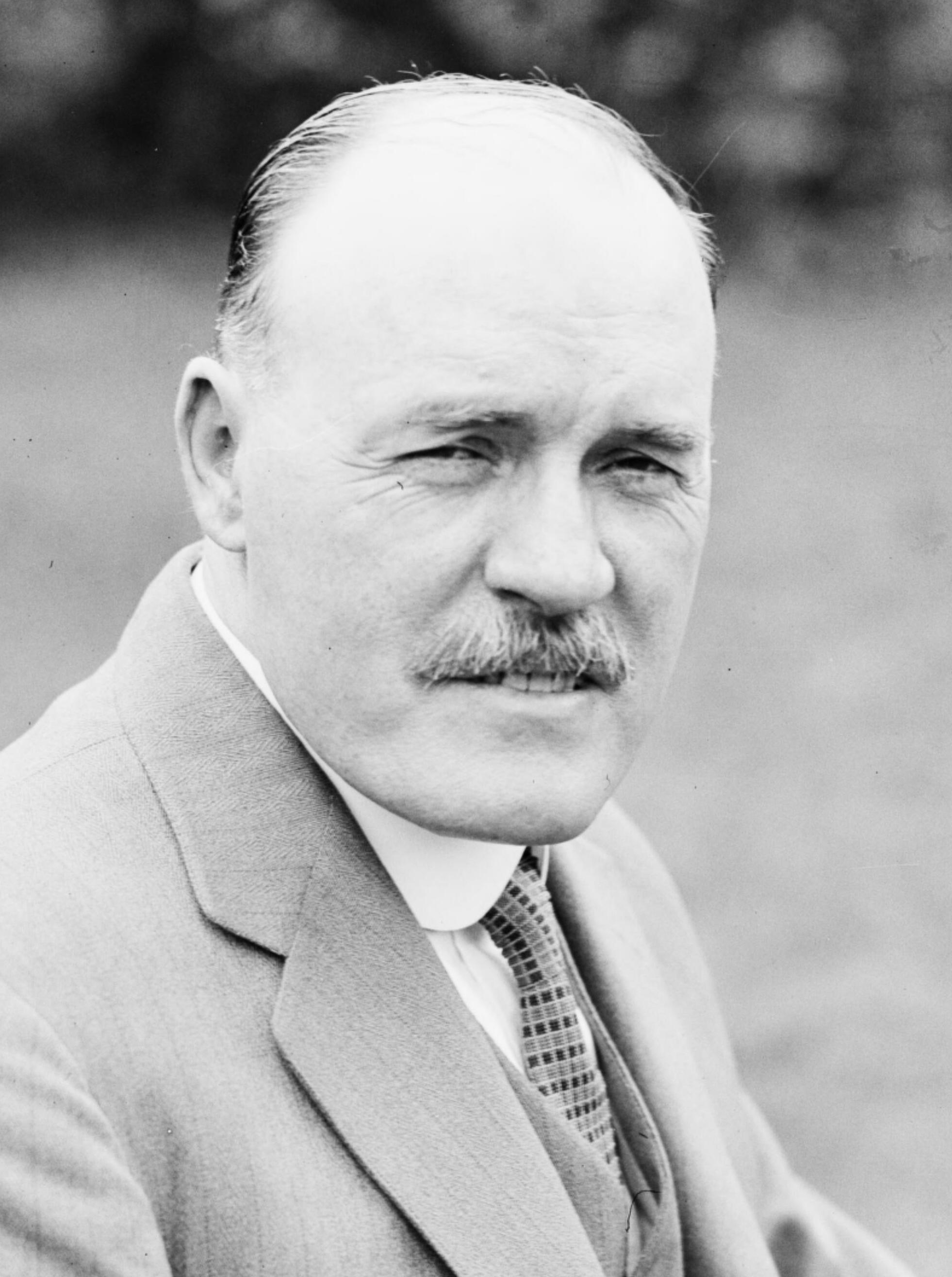

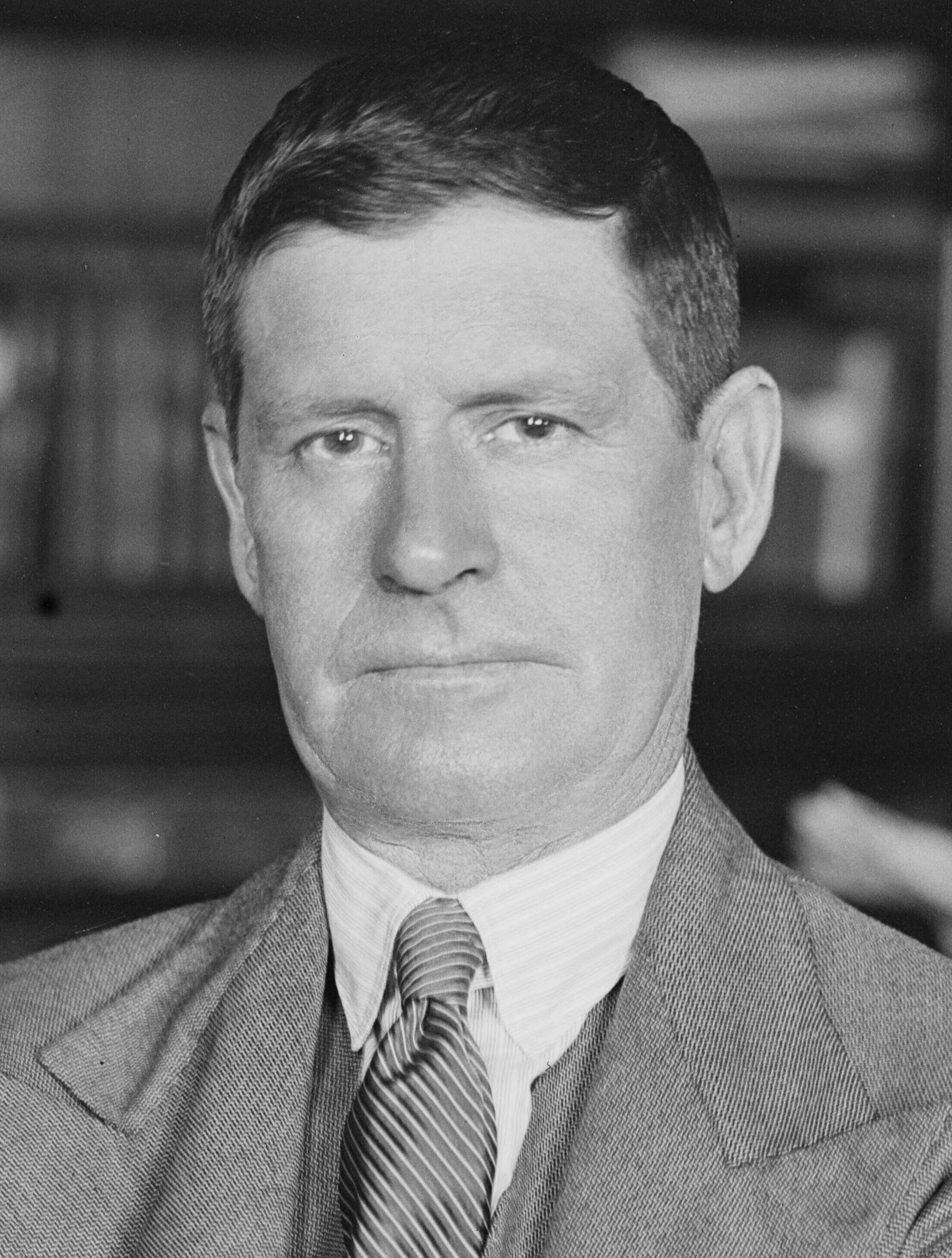

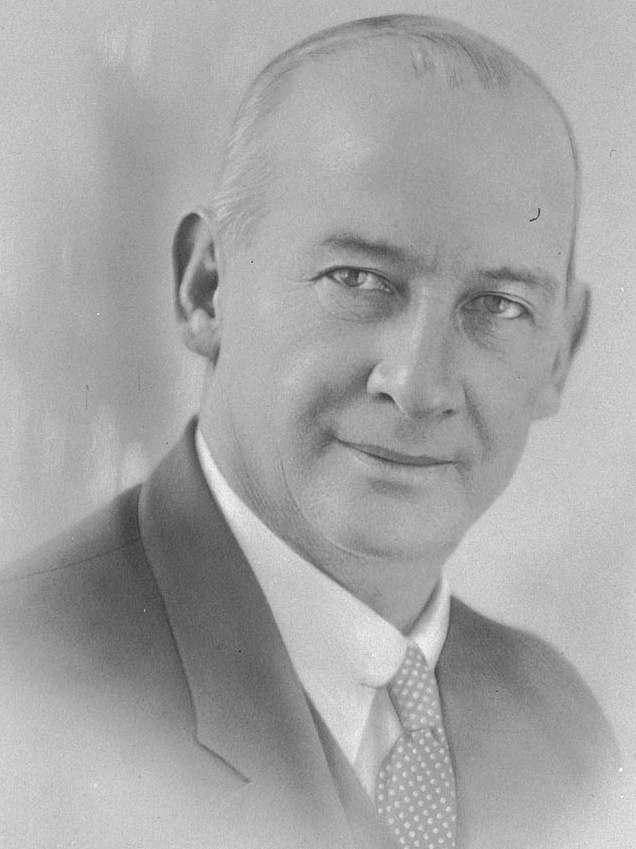
	First party	Second party	Third party
Leader	Jack Lang	Thomas Bavin	Ernest Buttenshaw
Party	Labor	Nationalist	Country
Leader since	31 July 1923	24 September 1925	1925
Leader's seat	Auburn	Gordon	Lachlan
Last election	40 seats, 43.00%	33 seats, 38.48%	13 seats, 8.89%
Seats won	55	23	12
Seat change	▲15	▼10	▼1
Popular vote	729,914	404,405	126,779
Percentage	55.05%	30.50%	9.56%
Swing	▲12.05%	▼7.98%	▲0.67%
- Results by division for the Legislative Assembly, shaded by winning party's margin of victory.

- Composition of New South Wales Legislative Assembly following the election.
Premier before election
Thomas Bavin
Nationalist (Nationalist–Country Coalition)
Elected Premier
Jack Lang
Labor

The 1930 New South Wales state election was held on 25 October 1930. The election was conducted in single member constituencies with compulsory preferential voting. The election occurred at the height of the Great Depression and was a landslide victory for the expansionary monetary policies of Jack Lang.

As a result of the election, the Nationalist/Country Party coalition government of Thomas Bavin and Ernest Buttenshaw was defeated and the Labor party, led by Jack Lang, formed government with a parliamentary majority of 20. The Parliament first met on 25 November 1930, and had a maximum term of 3 years. However it was dissolved after only 18 months on 18 May 1932 when the Governor, Sir Philip Game dismissed the Premier Jack Lang and commissioned Bertram Stevens to form a caretaker government. Thomas Bavin was the Leader of the Opposition until 5 April 1932 when he was replaced by Bertram Stevens. Michael Bruxner replaced Buttenshaw as leader of the Country Party in early 1932.

== Key dates ==
Date	Event
18 September 1930	The Legislative Assembly was dissolved, and writs were issued by the Governor to proceed with an election.
2 October 1930	Nominations for candidates for the election closed.
25 October 1930	Polling day.
4 November 1930	Third Lang ministry sworn in.
21 November 1930	Writs returned.
23 June 1932	Opening of 29th Parliament.

== Results ==
New South Wales state election, 25 October 1930 Legislative Assembly << 1927–1932 >>
Enrolled voters	1,428,648 (Note: There were 1,440,785 enrolled voters, but 12,137 were enrolled in the Country-held seat of Byron, which was uncontested.)				
Votes cast	1,325,945		Turnout	94.94	+12.4
Informal votes	30,478		Informal	2.25	+0.94
Summary of votes by party
Party	Primary votes	%	Swing	Seats	Change
Labor	729,914	55.05	+12.05	55	+15
Nationalist	404,405	30.50	–7.98	23	–10
Country	126,779	9.56	+0.67	12	–1
Australian	27,493	2.07	+2.07	0	±0
Communist	10,445	0.79	+0.79	0	±0
Independent Labor	7,186	0.54	–2.30	0	–2
Independent Country	3,298	0.25	–0.13	0	±0
Ind. Nationalist	977	0.07	–2.58	0	–2
Independents	15,448	1.17	–1.95	0	±0
Total	1,325,945			90	

Popular vote
Labor	55.05%
Nationalist	30.50%
Country	9.56%
Australian	2.07%
Others	2.82%
Parliamentary seats
Labor	55
Nationalist	23
Country	12

== Changing seats ==
Seats changing hands
Seat	1927			1930	
Seat	Party	Member	Note	Member	Party
Albury	Nationalist	John Ross	Defeated as Independent.	Joseph Fitzgerald	United Australia
Alexandria	Labor	Bill Ratcliffe	District abolished, won Barwon.		
Arncliffe			New district	Joseph Cahill	Labor
Ashburnham	Nationalist	Edmund Best	Defeated	William Keast	Labor
Balmain	Independent Labor	H. V. Evatt	Appointed to the High Court.	John Quirk	Labor
Barwon	Nationalist	Walter Wearne	Retired	Bill Ratcliffe	Labor
Bondi	Ind. Nationalist	Harold Jaques	Defeated as Nationalist.	Abe Landa	Labor
Botany	Independent Labor	Thomas Mutch	Defeated	Bob Heffron	Labor
Bulli			New district	Andrew Lysaght	Labor
Casino			New district	John Reid	Country
Castlereagh	Country	Harold Thorby	Defeated for Dubbo	Joseph Clark	Labor
Cobar			New district	Mat Davidson	Labor
Concord			New district	Henry McDicken	Labor
Drummoyne	Nationalist	John Lee	Defeated	David McLelland	Labor
Dubbo			New district	Alfred McClelland	Labor
Dulwich Hill	Nationalist	John Ness	Defeated	Frank Connors	Labor
Eastwood	Nationalist	David Anderson	District abolished, defeated for Ryde.		
Enmore	Labor	Joe Lamaro	District abolished, won Petersham.		
Georges River			New district	Ted Kinsella	Labor
Kahibah	Labor	Hugh Connell	District abolished, won Hamilton.		
Kogarah			New district	Mark Gosling	Labor
North Sydney	Nationalist	Ernest Marks	Defeated	Ben Howe	Labor
Parramatta	Nationalist	Herbert Lloyd	Defeated	Joseph Byrne	Labor
Oatley	Labor	Mark Gosling	District abolished, won Kogarah.		
Petersham			New district	Joe Lamaro	Labor
Randwick	Nationalist	Ernest Tresidder	Defeated	Jack Flanagan	Labor
Rockdale	Nationalist	Guy Arkins	District abolished, defeated for Waverley.		
Rozelle	Labor	John Quirk	District abolished, won Balmain.		
Ryde	Nationalist	David Anderson	Defeated	Evan Davies	Labor
St George	Labor	Joseph Cahill	District abolished, won Arncliffe.		
Surry Hills	Labor	Tom Shannon	District abolished, won Phillip.		
Wallsend	Labor	Robert Cameron	District abolished, partly replaced by Waratah.		
Waratah			New district	Robert Cameron	Labor
Waverley	Nationalist	Carl Glasgow	Retired	William Clementson	Labor
Willoughby	Ind. Nationalist	Edward Sanders	Joined Nationalist	Edward Sanders	Nationalist
Wollongong	Labor	Billy Davies	District abolished, won Illawarra.		
Yass			New district	George Ardill	Nationalist
Young	Country	Albert Reid	Defeated	Clarrie Martin	Labor

== See also ==
- Candidates of the 1930 New South Wales state election
- Members of the New South Wales Legislative Assembly, 1930–1932
