= 1904 Ryde state by-election =

Election result for Ryde, New South Wales, Australia

A by-election was held for the New South Wales Legislative Assembly electorate of Ryde on 23 January 1904 because of the resignation of Frank Farnell (Independent Liberal) who had been appointed Chairman of the Fisheries Board.

== Dates ==
| Date | Event |
|---|---|
| 27 February 1903 | Frank Farnell appointed Chairman of the Fisheries Board. |
| 31 December 1903 | Frank Farnell resigned from Parliament. |
| 4 January 1904 | Writ of election issued by the Speaker of the Legislative Assembly. |
| 15 January 1904 | Nominations |
| 23 January 1904 | Polling day |
| 30 January 1904 | Return of writ |

== Result ==
1904 Ryde by-election Saturday 24 May
| Party | Candidate | Votes | % | ±% |
|---|---|---|---|---|
| Independent Liberal | Edward Terry (elected) | 1,136 | 51.2 | |
| Liberal Reform | Thomas Henley | 1,082 | 48.8 | +19.5 |
| Total formal votes | | 2,218 | 99.0 | −0.2 |
| Informal votes | | 22 | 1.0 | +0.2 |
| Turnout | | 2,240 | 75.1 (Note: Estimate based on a roll of 3,107 at the 1901 election.) | −0.5 |
| Independent Liberal hold | | | | |

== See also ==
- Electoral results for the district of Ryde
- List of New South Wales state by-elections
