= 1940 Ryde state by-election =

Election result for Ryde, New South Wales, Australia

A by-election was held for the New South Wales Legislative Assembly electorate of Ryde on 14 September 1940 following the resignation of Eric Spooner (United Australia), to contest the federal seat of Robertson at the 1940 election, at which he was elected.

== Dates ==
Date	Event
23 August 1940	Eric Spooner resigned.
30 August 1940	Writ of election issued by the Speaker of the Legislative Assembly.
5 September 1940	Nominations
14 September 1940	Polling day
21 September 1940	Federal election
28 September 1940	Return of writ

== Candidates ==
- Bert Cowell (Independent) was a grocer from Gladesville.
- William Harrison (Independent) was an estate agent from West Ryde and the Mayor of Ryde, the youngest to hold that office.
- Herbert Mitchell (United Australia) was a secretary and superintendent of the Central District Ambulance.
- James Stewart (State Labor) was a tyre moulder, representing the far-left Hughes-Evans group, which had been removed as the Labor executive in July 1940.
- Arthur Williams (Labor) was an accountant specialising in the auditing of trade unions.

== Result ==
1940 Ryde by-election Saturday 14 September
Party	Candidate	Votes	%	±%
Labor	Arthur Williams	7,680	35.6	+9.3
United Australia	Herbert Mitchell	7,742	35.9	−17.4
Independent	William Harrison	3,048	14.1	−6.3
State Labor	James Stewart	1,685	7.8	
Independent	Bert Cowell	1,431	6.6	
Total formal votes		21,586	96.6	−2.1
Informal votes		755	3.4	+2.1
Turnout		22,341	89.7	−7.3
Two-party-preferred result
Labor	Arthur Williams	10,908	50.5	
United Australia	Herbert Mitchell	10,678	49.5	
Labor gain from United Australia		Swing	N/A	

== See also ==
- Electoral results for the district of Ryde
- List of New South Wales state by-elections
