= 1945 Ryde state by-election =

Election result for Ryde, New South Wales, Australia

A by-election was held in the state electoral district of Ryde on 3 February 1945. The by-election was triggered by the death of James Shand (Independent Democrat).

The by-election was won by Liberal candidate Eric Hearnshaw. This was the first election contested and first election won by the Liberal Party in New South Wales since the founding of its New South Wales division a month earlier in January 1945. Hearnshaw also became the first Liberal Party member in the New South Wales parliament, as at the time, parliamentary members of the Democratic Party had yet to join the Liberal Party.

== Dates ==
Date	Event
21 December 1944	James Shand died.
10 January 1945	Writ of election issued by the Speaker of the Legislative Assembly.
19 January 1945	Nominations
3 February 1945	Polling day
16 February 1945	Return of writ

== Results ==
1945 Ryde by-election Saturday 3 February
Party	Candidate	Votes	%	±%
Liberal	Eric Hearnshaw	7,630	38.6	+19.6
Labor	William Browne	5,591	28.3	+2.2
Independent	George Vaughan	2,690	13.6	
Independent	William Irvine	1,853	9.4	
Independent	Leonard McKay	998	5.1	
Independent	Henry Brierly	512	2.6	
Social Credit	Howard Miscamble	382	1.9	+0.5
Fair Deal	John Price	102	0.5	
Total formal votes		19,758	94.6	−1.5
Informal votes		1,127	5.4	+1.5
Turnout		20,885	83.9	−8.5
Two-party-preferred result
Liberal	Eric Hearnshaw	11,339	57.4	
Labor	William Browne	8,419	42.6	
Liberal gain from Independent		Swing	N/A	

== See also ==
- Electoral results for the district of Ryde
- List of New South Wales state by-elections
