= 1970 Georges River state by-election =

Election result for Georges River, New South Wales, Australia

The 1970 Georges River state by-election was held on 19 September 1970 for the New South Wales Legislative Assembly seat of Georges River. It was triggered by the death of Douglas Cross (Liberal).

== Dates ==
Date	Event
19 July 1970	Douglas Cross died.
21 August 1970	Writ of election issued by the Speaker of the Legislative Assembly and close of electoral rolls.
28 August 1970	Day of nomination
19 September 1970	Polling day
9 October 1970	Return of writ

== Result ==
1970 Georges River by-election Saturday 19 September
Party	Candidate	Votes	%	±%
Labor	Frank Walker	12,104	47.8	+6.5
Liberal	John Tonkin	10,208	40.3	−18.4
Defence of Government Schools	Robin Alleway	1,847	7.3	
Democratic Labor	B Payne	1,040	4.1	
Independent	William Leo Hutchinson	118	0.5	
Total formal votes		25,317	98.0	+0.8
Informal votes		514	2.0	−0.5
Turnout		25,831	86.0	−9.3
Two-party-preferred result
Labor	Frank Walker	13,256	52.4	+11.1
Liberal	John Tonkin	12,061	47.6	−11.1
Labor gain from Liberal		Swing	11.1	

== See also ==
- Electoral results for the district of Georges River
- List of New South Wales state by-elections
