= A Start in Life =

A Start in Life may refer to:

- A Start in Life (charity), an Australian educational organisation
- A Start in Life (Путёвка в жизнь), a 1931 sound film directed by Nikolai Ekk
- A Start in Life (Brookner novel), a 1981 debut novel by Anita Brookner
- A Start in Life (Sillitoe novel), a 1970 novel by Alan Sillitoe
