= Thomas Bavin =

Australian politician

The Honourable Sir Thomas Bavin KCMG, KC
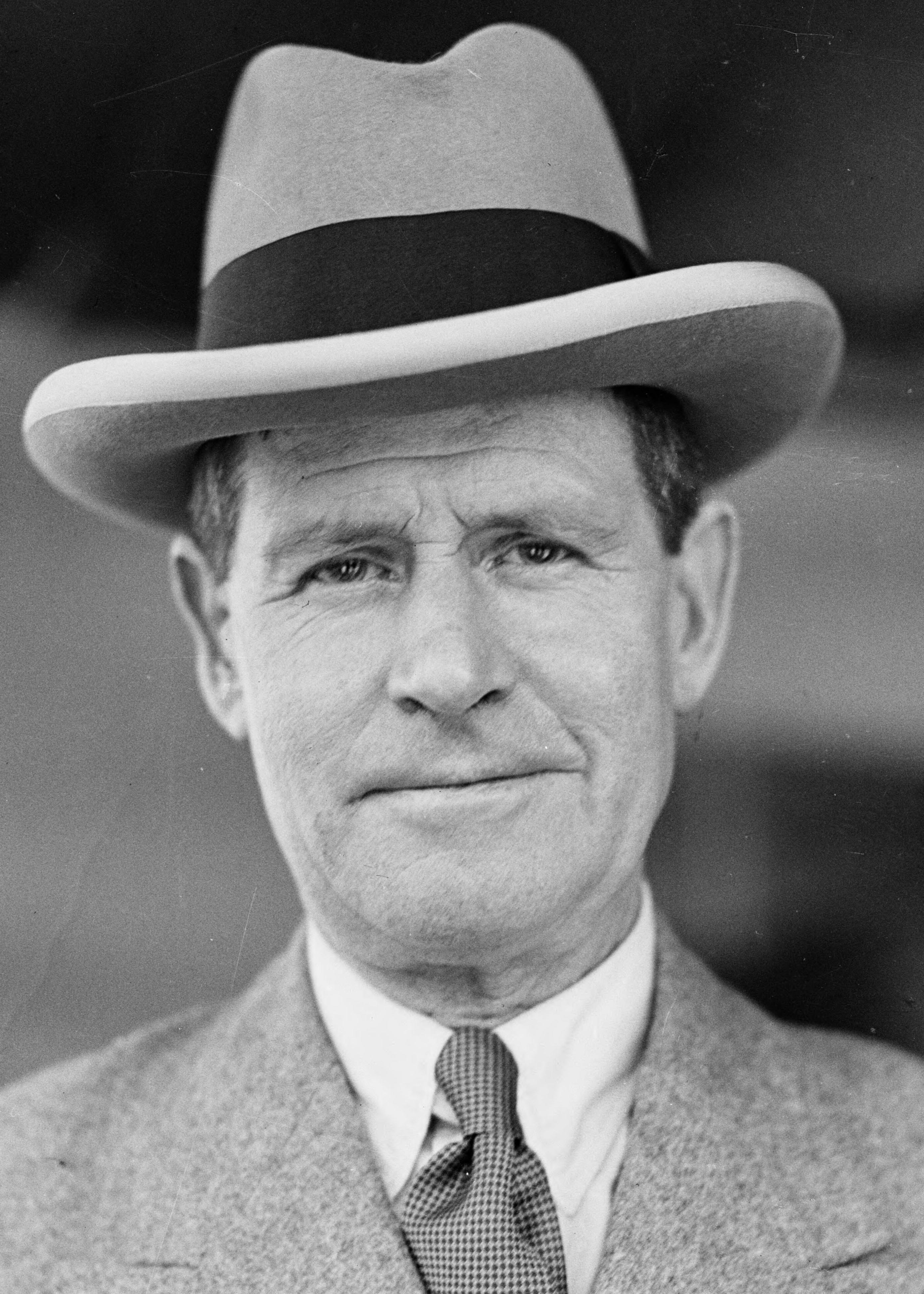

24th Premier of New South Wales
- In office 18 October 1927 – 4 November 1930
- Preceded by: Jack Lang
- Succeeded by: Jack Lang
- Constituency: Gordon (1917–20); Ryde (1920–27); Gordon (1927–35)

Personal details
- Born: Thomas Rainsford Bavin; 5 May 1874 Kaiapoi, Canterbury, New Zealand
- Died: 31 August 1941 (aged 67) Bellevue Hill, New South Wales, Australia
- Party: Nationalist
- Spouse: Edyth Winchcombe
- Education: Newington College; University of Sydney

Sir Thomas Rainsford Bavin, KCMG, KC (5 May 1874 – 31 August 1941) was an Australian lawyer and politician who served as Premier of New South Wales from 1927 to 1930. He was born in New Zealand and arrived in Australia at the age of 15, where he studied law and became a barrister. He served as personal secretary to Australia's first two prime ministers, Edmund Barton and Alfred Deakin. Bavin was elected to the New South Wales Legislative Assembly in 1917. He served two terms as Attorney General of New South Wales (1921, 1922–1925) before leading the Nationalist Party to victory at the 1927 state election, in a coalition with the Country Party. His predecessor Jack Lang and the Australian Labor Party (ALP) defeated his government after a single term at the 1930 state election.

== Early years ==
Born in Kaiapoi, New Zealand to a Methodist minister and his wife, Bavin was educated at Auckland Grammar School until 1889 when his family moved to Sydney and Bavin enrolled at Newington College (1889–1890). His siblings were: Edna (Mrs Charles Lack); Jessie (Mrs Ambrose Fletcher); Gertrude (Mrs William Parker); Major Cyril Bavin OBE; Horace Bavin; Florence Bavin (Mrs Ernest Warren); Lancelot Bavin; and Dora Bavin (Mrs Leslie Allen). At the University of Sydney he came into conflict with his parents by renouncing Methodism (he later converted to Anglicanism), and graduated with a BA in 1894 and LL.B. in 1897, winning the University Medal in the process.

== Legal career and early political involvement ==
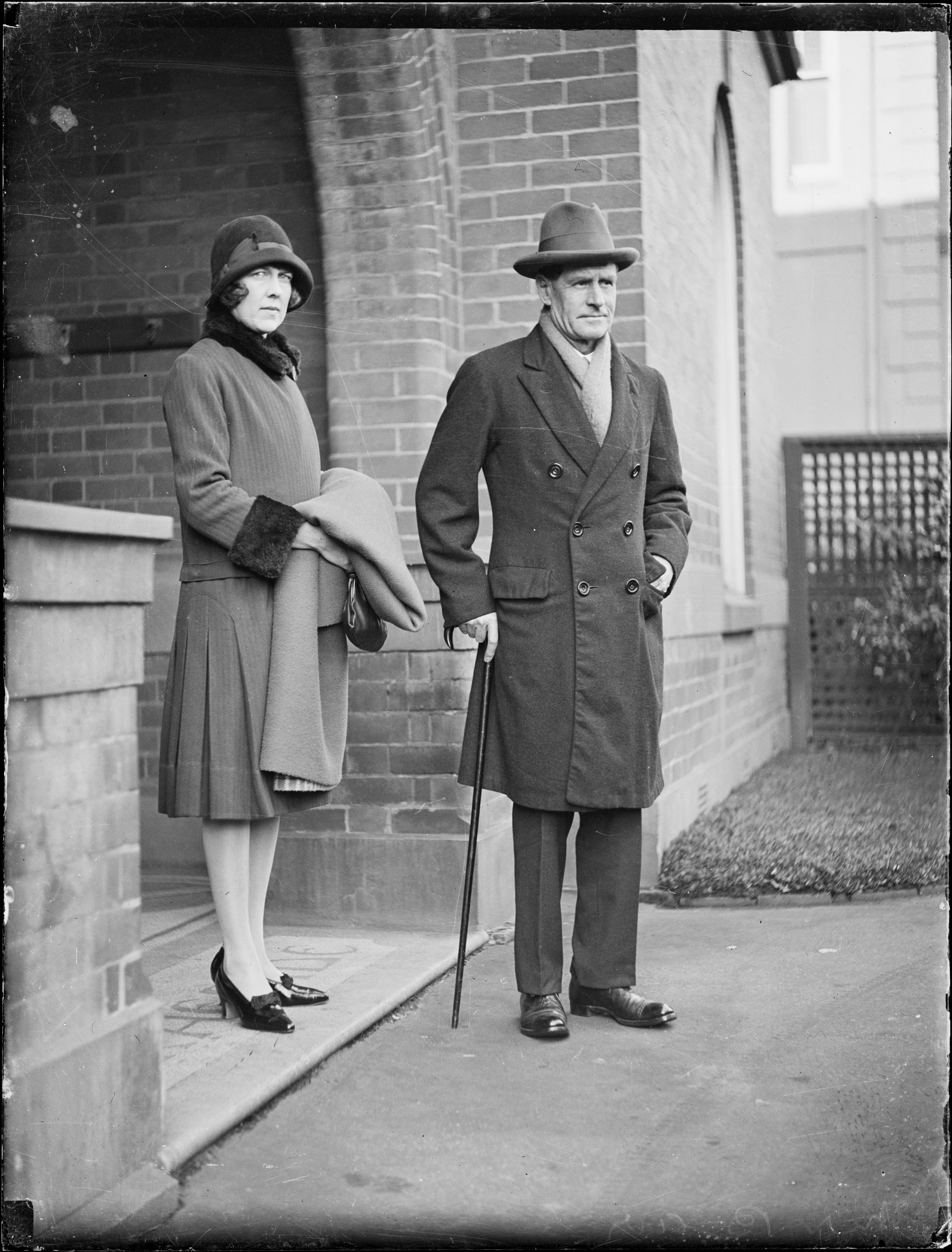
Bavin and his wife Edyth

Called to the New South Wales Bar in 1897, Bavin became involved in the cause of Australian Federation, unsuccessfully standing for the Legislative Assembly seat of Canterbury on a pro-Federation platform in 1898. After lecturing in law at the University of Tasmania in 1900 where he was acting professor of law, Bavin returned to Sydney to marry Edyth Winchcombe, the daughter of Frederick Winchcombe, a member of the New South Wales Legislative Assembly and Council, on 6 February 1901.

Bavin first met Edmund Barton during their shared involvement in the federation movement. In 1901, after a chance encounter at an Albury railway station, Barton appointed him as his private secretary in place of Atlee Hunt, who had received a promotion. Bavin found Barton easily distracted and unable or willing to deal with routine administrative matters, later recalling that "having done his greatest work Barton was no longer very interested in the result". When Barton resigned to become a judge on the High Court, Bavin became his associate but also continued on as private secretary to Barton's successor Alfred Deakin.

Bavin returned to the Bar in 1904 but found briefs scarce and so began writing op-ed pieces for Sydney newspapers, and, along with Deakin, serve as the Australian correspondent for the London Morning Post from 1907 to 1911. In 1913, he inquired into food supplies and prices and went to sea on the trawlers to investigate pricing of fish in detail. He recommended an anti-monopoly bureau that could investigate prices and recommend prosecutions. Bavin was elected as an alderman to Willoughby Municipal Council in 1910. When World War I broke out he became a naval intelligence officer.

== State politics ==
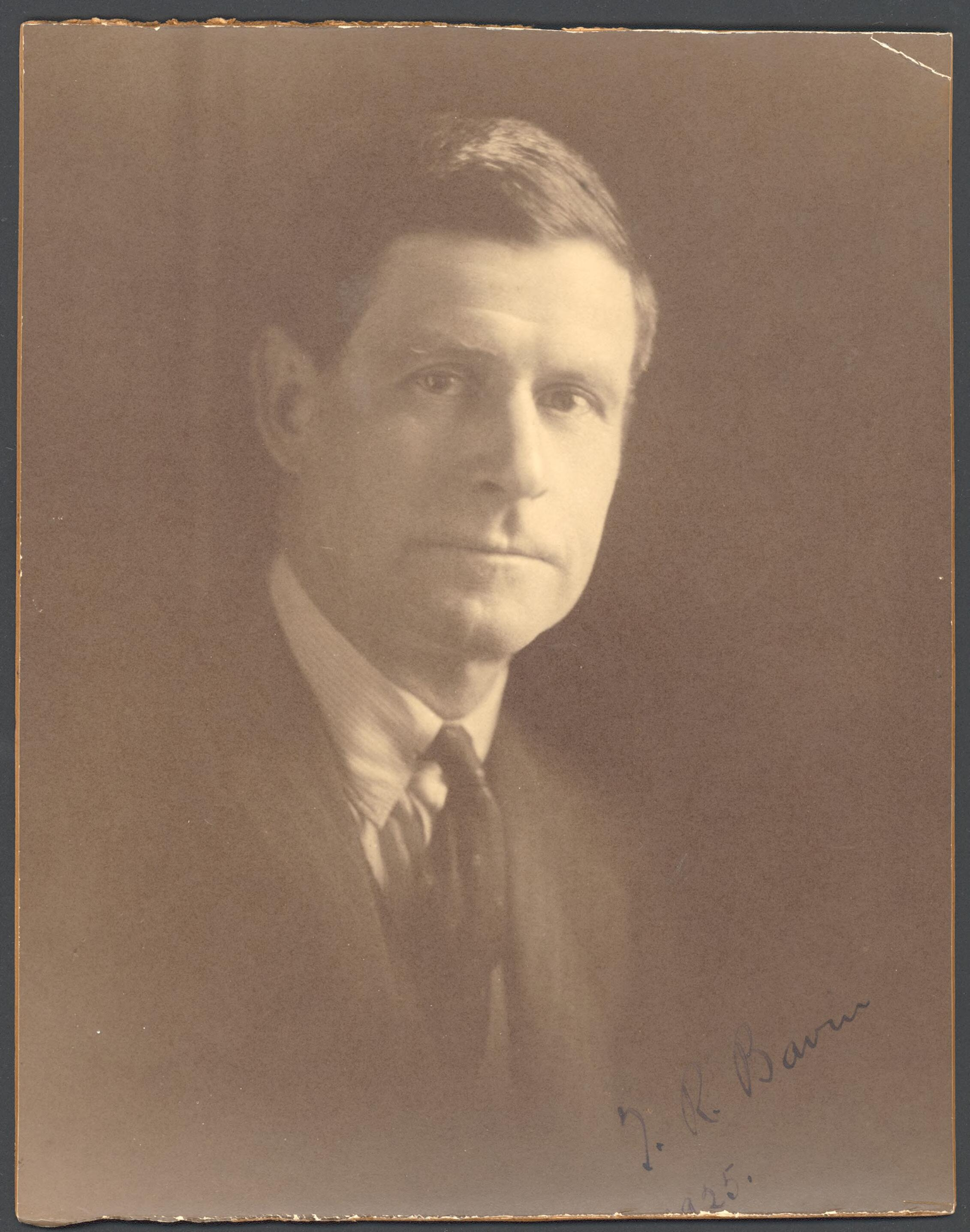
Bavin in 1925

Bavin's attempts to enter federal parliament were thwarted, thrice losing Commonwealth Liberal Party pre-selection, due partly to his support for greater social welfare expenditure. He gained pre-selection for the Legislative Assembly seat of Albury in 1916 but the election was deferred until 1917, when he was elected as the Nationalist Party member for Gordon, a seat which he held until 1935, except during the period of proportional representation (1920–1927) when he was a member for Ryde.

Following his election, Bavin rapidly rose through the parliamentary ranks, becoming deputy leader of the Nationalists in October 1920 and serving as Attorney-General and Minister for Justice in 1921 and Attorney-General of New South Wales from 1922 to 1925. After the Nationalist loss at the 1925 election, Bavin was elected party leader, and therefore Leader of the Opposition.

== Premier of New South Wales ==
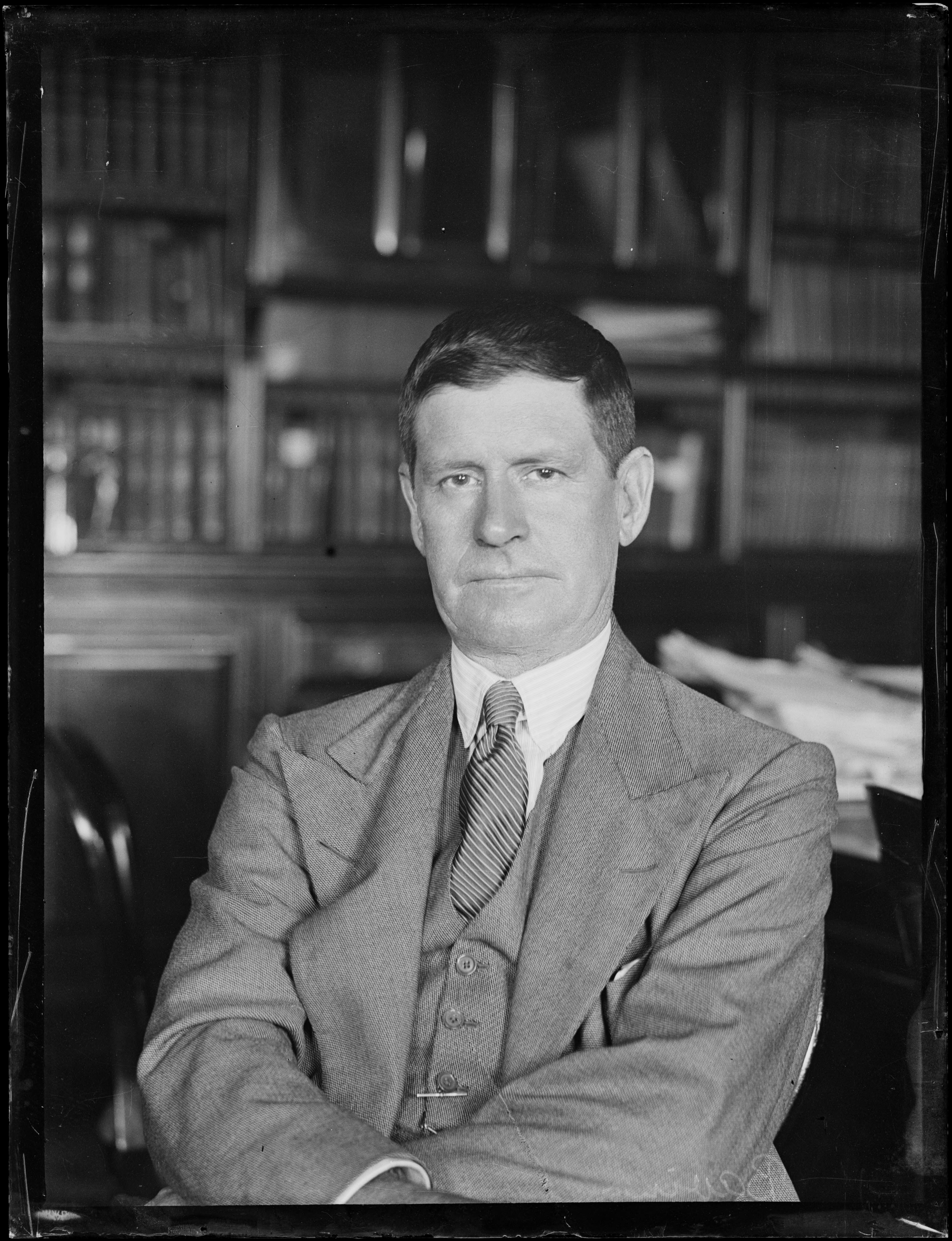
Bavin in his office, c. 1930

Following an agreement by the Nationalist and Country parties not to stand candidates against each other, the coalition won the 1927 election and Bavin became Premier and Treasurer on 18 October 1927.

During his term as Premier, Bavin introduced the Income Tax (Management) Act (1928), under which the incomes of husband and wife were combined, and a progressive tax system was introduced, angering many of his conservative supporters. In reaction to Labor Party calls to abolish the Legislative Council, Bavin pushed through legislation requiring a referendum to do so.

Bavin was plagued by ill-health throughout his Premiership, meaning that he was absent him from Cabinet during crucial times, especially in the wake of the Great Depression after 1929. Faced with a growing number of strikes, Bavin turned to non-unionised labour, which led to violent confrontations between striking workers and police, notably the Rothbury riot in December 1929.

== Later life ==
Following the Nationalists' loss in the 1930 election, Bavin continued to lead the party until 1932, when he joined the newly created United Australia Party. Appointed KCMG in 1933, Bavin retired from politics in 1935 to serve as a Justice of the New South Wales Supreme Court. Bavin also returned to writing, authoring a number of books, including Thomas Rainsford Bavin: Extracts from his Speeches from 1923 until 1932 (1933), and Sir Henry Parkes: His Life and Work (1941).

Bavin died of cancer in the Sydney suburb of Bellevue Hill, survived by his wife, son and three daughters. His well-attended funeral was held at St. Andrew's Cathedral, Sydney on 2 September 1941. He was later cremated at Northern Suburbs Crematorium.

== Honours ==
Bavin was appointed KCMG in 1933.

=== Namesakes ===
In 2021 Bavin house at Newington College was named after him.

New South Wales Legislative Assembly
Preceded by Charles Wade	Member for Gordon; 1917–1920	District abolished
Preceded by William Thompson	Member for Ryde; 1920–1927; With: Anderson, Greig, Henley, Loxton/Sanders	Succeeded by Henry McDicken
New district	Member for Gordon; 1927–1935	Succeeded by Philip Goldfinch
Political offices
Preceded by Edward McTiernan	Attorney General of New South Wales; 1921	Succeeded by Edward McTiernan
Preceded by William McKell	Minister for Justice; 1921	Succeeded by William McKell
Preceded by Edward McTiernan	Attorney General of New South Wales; 1922–1925	Succeeded by Edward McTiernan
Preceded by Sir George Fuller	Leader of the Opposition of New South Wales; 1925–1927	Succeeded by Jack Lang
Preceded by Jack Lang	Premier of New South Wales; 1927–1930	Succeeded by Jack Lang
Preceded by Jack Lang	Colonial Treasurer of New South Wales; 1927–1929	Succeeded by Sir Bertram Stevens
Preceded by Albert Bruntnell	Colonial Secretary of New South Wales; 1929	Succeeded by Frank Chaffey
Preceded by Jack Lang	Leader of the Opposition of New South Wales; 1930–1932	Succeeded by Sir Bertram Stevens
Party political offices
Preceded by Sir George Fuller	Leader of the Nationalist Party; 1925–1931	Merged into UAP
New political party	Leader of the United Australia Party; 1931–1932	Succeeded by Sir Bertram Stevens
