= Robert Greig (politician) =

Australian politician

Robert John Greig (1887 – 27 April 1955) was an Australian politician for the Labor Party. He represented the Electoral district of Drummoyne 1941–1947. He served alongside Thomas Bavin in the Electoral district of Ryde 1920–27.

New South Wales Legislative Assembly
| Preceded by William Thompson | Member for Ryde; 1920–1927; Served alongside: Anderson, Bavin, Henley, Loxton/Sanders | Succeeded by Henry McDicken |
| Preceded by John Lee | Member for Drummoyne; 1941–1947 | Succeeded by Robert Dewley |
