= Thomas Henley (Australian politician) =

Australian politician

Thomas Henley

Sir Thomas Henley KBE (4 February 1860 – 14 May 1935) was an Australian politician, elected as a member of the New South Wales Legislative Assembly.

== Early years ==
Henley was born in Wootton Bassett, Wiltshire, England and after basic education worked in the building industry for about ten years until he migrated to Sydney in about 1884. He married Charlotte Smith in 1886. He became a property developer and continued to build up his business during the depression of the 1890s, including acquiring Sydney Harbour ferry companies. He was an alderman for Drummoyne Council from 1898 to 1934, including four periods as Mayor.

== Political career ==
Henley was elected to the Legislative Assembly in 1904 representing Burwood as a member of the Liberal Reform Party, Nationalist Party and United Australia Party until 1935, except for the period of proportional representation (1920–1927), when he was a member for Ryde. He had a forthright parliamentary style, boasting of his own success and the merits of hard work. Opponents called him the "great 'I am".

He was a member of the Metropolitan Water Sewerage and Drainage Board, commonly known as the Water Board, for much of the time between 1903 and 1933.

He was very briefly appointed as Minister for Public Works and Minister for Railways and Housing, on two occasions, in 1921 and 1922.

Henley fell from a Manly ferry and drowned on 14 May 1935 amid rumours of suicide. He was buried in Field of Mars Cemetery at Ryde. He was survived by his wife, two daughters and a son Herbert, who was a member of the Legislative Council from 1937 to 1964.

New South Wales Legislative Assembly
Preceded by William Archer	Member for Burwood; 1904–1920	Succeeded by Abolished
Preceded by William Thompson	Member for Ryde; 1920–1927; Served alongside: Anderson, Bavin, Greig, Loxton/Sanders	Succeeded by Henry McDicken
Preceded by New seat	Member for Burwood; 1927–1935	Succeeded by Gordon Jackett
