= A Start in Life (charity) =

Australian charity for students

A Start in Life is an Australian registered charity founded in Sydney in 1923 that provides financial assistance and educational support to young Australians experiencing financial disadvantage. The charity supports students aged 4 to 24 in New South Wales and the Australian Capital Territory, from their first year of school through to the completion of university or TAFE study. Since its founding, A Start in Life has supported more than 7,000 students.

The charity holds Deductible Gift Recipient (DGR1) status, meaning donations of two dollars or more are tax deductible for Australian taxpayers. A Start in Life is funded primarily through philanthropic support, including individual donors, corporate partners, philanthropic foundations, trusts, workplace giving programs, and gifts in wills.

A Start in Life is registered with the Australian Charities and Not-for-profits Commission (ACNC) under ABN 21 871 881 074 and is exempt from Income Tax and Fringe Benefits Tax.

== History ==
A Start in Life was founded in 1923 by William Thompson (New South Wales politician), a New South Wales politician and Grand Master of the United Grand Lodge of New South Wales. Following the death of his son on the Western Front during the First World War, Thompson was moved by the number of children left orphaned by the conflict. In 1922 he established the William Thompson Masonic School at Baulkham Hills, providing care and education for children who had lost parents to the war. The following year, in 1923, he founded the charity under its original name, The NSW Masonic Schools Welfare Fund, to extend that support more broadly to the children of affected Masonic families.

As government welfare expanded and social needs evolved over the following decades, the charity broadened its scope. In 1972, the constitution was formally amended to extend educational support to any young Australian experiencing financial hardship, regardless of race, religion, Masonic affiliation, or any other background. The charity adopted its current name, A Start in Life, at this time.

Over more than 100 years of continuous operation, A Start in Life has remained an independent charity funded predominantly through philanthropic contributions.

== Mission ==
A Start in Life's mission is to assist students without life's necessities to seek a brighter future through education. The charity operates on the belief that financial hardship should not determine a young person's educational outcomes, and that targeted, personalised support at the right moment can break intergenerational cycles of disadvantage.

Students supported by A Start in Life are living below the poverty line, typically with limited or no family assets. Financial hardship is often compounded by additional indicators of social disadvantage, including poor health, housing instability, family breakdown, geographic remoteness, and social isolation. Without support, these pressures place students at significant risk of underperformance, disengagement, and early departure from education.

As a small charity, A Start in Life maintains a direct, ongoing relationship with every student it supports. Support is individually tailored, regularly reviewed, and extends beyond financial assistance to encompass engagement, self-esteem, resilience, social connection, and long-term vocational ambition.

== Eligibility and referrals ==
To be eligible for assistance, students must meet the following criteria:

- Aged at least 4 years and under 25 years of age
- Enrolled in full-time, face-to-face study at a primary school, high school, university, or TAFE in New South Wales or the Australian Capital Territory
- Experiencing financial disadvantage, with household income assessed as below the poverty line
- Willing to actively engage with the charity's program and Student Assistance Team

Students and families are most commonly referred to A Start in Life by their school or educational institution. Referrals are also received from welfare agencies, including the Department of Communities and Justice (New South Wales), psychologists, healthcare providers, and other community organisations. Self-referrals from students and families are welcomed and encouraged. Professionals including teachers, school counsellors, social workers, and psychologists may refer students directly through the charity's website.

All applications are assessed against the charity's eligibility criteria and reviewed regularly to ensure ongoing need.

== Program ==
Support may include assistance with educational expenses such as school fees, uniforms, textbooks, technology, and other learning materials. Students who continue to university or TAFE study may remain eligible for support. A Start in Life delivers support through a unified education support program known as Learning Essentials, which assists students in New South Wales and the Australian Capital Territory from Kindergarten through tertiary study, including university and TAFE education. The program consolidated several previously separate initiatives focused on primary school, secondary school, career development, and tertiary education support.

The program provides financial assistance and developmental support intended to reduce barriers to educational participation for students experiencing financial disadvantage. Assistance may include support for school fees, uniforms, textbooks, digital technology, excursions, extracurricular activities, and other educational expenses.

For secondary school students, the program also incorporates career development and skills-building activities, including mentoring, workplace exposure, career coaching, and workshops focused on communication, leadership, collaboration, and other employability skills.

For university or TAFE students, this may include financial assistance for study-related expenses, technology, excursions, career sampling, work placements, and ongoing mentoring and wellbeing check-ins throughout their studies.

== Corporate and community support ==
A Start in Life engages with businesses, professional organisations, and community groups through several structured channels. Corporate and community support is a significant component of the charity's funding model.

=== Corporate partnerships ===
Businesses and organisations may partner with A Start in Life through sponsorships, joint programs, or shared campaigns. Partnerships are tailored to the objectives of the partner organisation and may include support for specific student cohorts, educational resources, or program delivery. Organisations that have partnered with A Start in Life include Australian Catholic University, the University of Sydney Business School, Western Sydney University, Torrens University Australia, and the Australian Institute of Professional Intelligence Officers.

=== Foundation sponsorship ===
Supporters wishing to make a transformative contribution may become Foundation Sponsors. A commitment of $20,000 or more per year enables the funding of specific programs and initiatives, including scholarships, mentoring, learning resources, and tailored student support services.

=== Workplace giving ===
A Start in Life participates in workplace giving programs, which allow employees to make regular donations directly from their pre-tax salary. Donations made through workplace giving are tax-effective for employees and can be established, changed, or cancelled at any time. Employers wishing to set up workplace giving for their staff may contact the charity directly.

=== Professional volunteering ===
Industry professionals and organisations may contribute expertise through one-on-one mentoring, industry excursions, and career sampling activities for students. Professional volunteers work alongside the charity's Student Assistance Team to help students explore career pathways, build confidence, and develop practical skills relevant to contemporary workplaces.

== Governance ==
A Start in Life is governed by an independent board of directors. The charity's operations and student support programs are funded by philanthropic contributions, including individual giving, major donations, corporate partnerships, foundation sponsorships, workplace giving, community fundraising, and gifts in wills.

Status	Detail
DGR1 — tax-deductible giving	Donations of $2 or more are tax deductible for Australian taxpayers
ACNC Registration	ABN 21 871 881 074
Income Tax	Exempt
Fringe Benefits Tax	Exempt
Government funding	Predominantly philanthropic funding
Founded	1923, Sydney, New South Wales, Australia
Geographic service area	New South Wales and the Australian Capital Territory
Students supported	More than 7,000 since 1923
Foundation Sponsorship	$20,000 or more per year

== See also ==
- Poverty in Australia
- Child poverty in Australia
- Australian Charities and Not-for-profits Commission
- Corporate social responsibility
- Payroll giving
- Charitable organization
