= William Thompson (New South Wales politician) =

Australian politician (1862–1937)

William Thompson (22 January 1862 – 6 October 1937) was an Australian politician.

He was born in Queanbeyan to surveyor James Banford Thompson and Margaret Carroll. From 1878 to 1885 he was a clerk in the Colonial Architect's office, before becoming a quantity surveyor and moving to Ryde in 1898. On 4 March 1885 he had married Florence Single, with whom he had three children. He owned a horse farm on the Hawkesbury River and was a founder of the William Thompson Masonic School at Baulkham Hills, New South Wales, which operated from 1922 to 1972, and the New South Wales Masonic Schools Welfare Fund which, as A Start in Life, continues to assist indigent youth. He was a Freemason and Grand Master of the Grand Lodge of New South Wales from 1914 until 1924. In 1913 he was elected to the New South Wales Legislative Assembly as the Liberal member for Ryde, serving until his retirement in 1920. In 1923 he established the Masonic Youth Welfare Fund. Thompson died at Ashfield in 1937.

New South Wales Legislative Assembly
New seat	Member for Ryde; 1913–1920	Succeeded by David Anderson; Thomas Bavin; Robert Greig; Sir Thomas Henley; Edward Loxton
