= Ken Anderson (politician) =

Australian politician (1909–1985)

The Honourable Sir Kenneth Anderson KBE
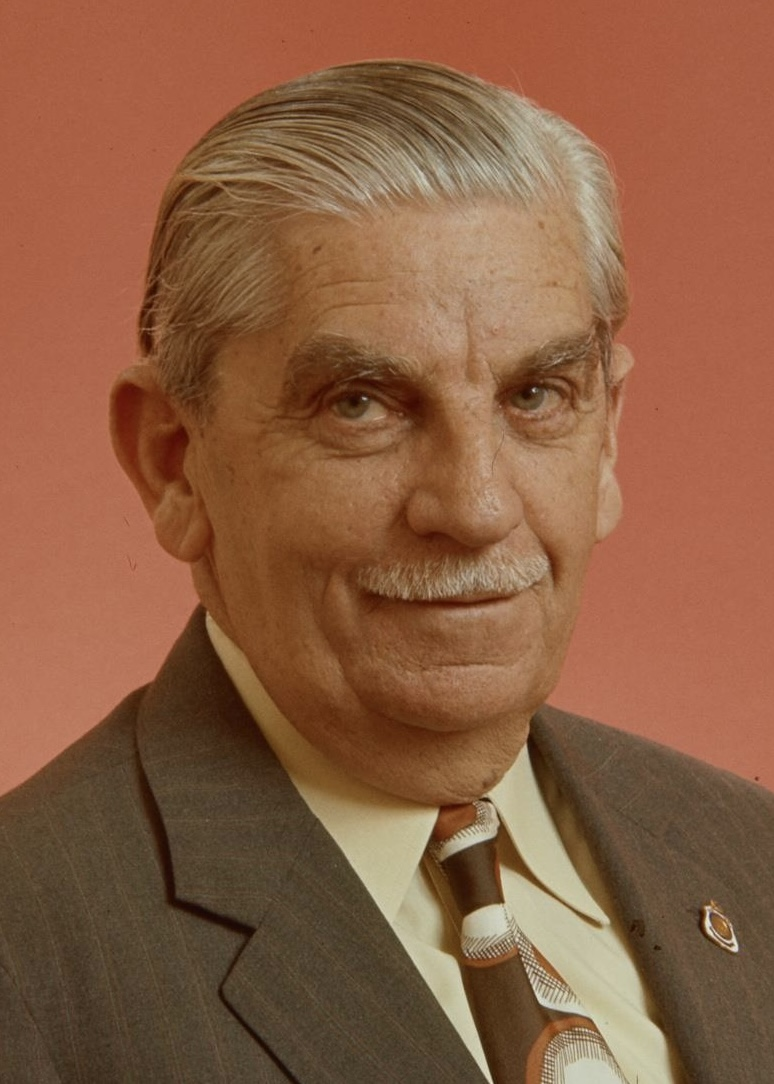
- Anderson in 1974

Leader of the Government in the Senate
- In office 28 February 1968 – 2 December 1972
- Prime Minister: John Gorton; William McMahon
- Deputy: Annabelle Rankin; Reg Wright
- Preceded by: John Gorton
- Succeeded by: Lionel Murphy

Minister for Health
- In office 2 August 1971 – 5 December 1972
- Prime Minister: William McMahon
- Preceded by: Ivor Greenwood
- Succeeded by: Doug Everingham

Minister for Supply
- In office 28 February 1968 – 2 August 1971
- Prime Minister: John Gorton; William McMahon
- Preceded by: Denham Henty
- Succeeded by: Victor Garland

Minister for Customs & Excise
- In office 10 June 1964 – 28 February 1968
- Prime Minister: Robert Menzies; Harold Holt; John McEwen; John Gorton
- Preceded by: Denham Henty
- Succeeded by: Malcolm Scott

Senator for New South Wales
- In office 1 July 1953 – 11 November 1975
- Preceded by: John Tate
- Succeeded by: Misha Lajovic

Personal details
- Born: 11 October 1909 at sea near Adelaide, South Australia
- Died: 29 March 1985 (aged 75) Lane Cove, New South Wales, Australia
- Party: Liberal
- Spouse: Madge Merrion (m. 1936)
- Occupation: Auctioneer, valuer

Sir Kenneth McColl Anderson KBE (11 October 1909 – 29 March 1985) was an Australian politician, soldier and businessman. He was a member of the Liberal Party and served as a Senator for New South Wales from 1953 to 1975. He held senior ministerial office in the Coalition governments of the late 1960s and early 1970s, including as Leader of the Government in the Senate from 1968 to 1972.

== Early life and career ==
Anderson was born at sea off of the coast of South Australia on 11 October 1909. He was the fifth of six children born to Florence May (née McWhirter) and David More Anderson. His father, a Scottish-born auctioneer and building contractor, was elected to the New South Wales Legislative Assembly in 1920.

Anderson was educated at Ryde Public School and Petersham Intermediate Schools in Sydney. He worked as an insurance clerk, auctioneer, estate agent and property valuer in the Sydney suburb of Eastwood. He married Madge Merrion in June 1936. He served in the Second Australian Imperial Force during World War II as a lieutenant in the 8th Signals Division in Malaya and was held by the Japanese as a prisoner of war in for three years at Changi Prison and on the Burma Railway. He was Mayor of Ryde Municipal Council from 1949 to 1950.

== Political career ==
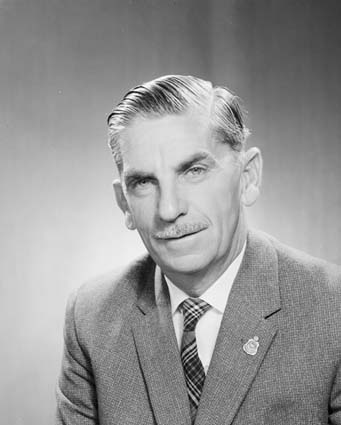
Anderson in 1962.

Anderson was elected as the member for Ryde in 1950, representing the Liberal Party, but was defeated at the 1953 election.

Anderson was a Senator for New South Wales, representing the Liberal Party from the 1953 half-senate elections until the dissolution of parliament before the 1975 election. He was Minister for Customs & Excise from June 1964 until February 1968 and Minister for Supply from February 1968 until August 1971 and Minister for Health from August 1971 until the defeat of the McMahon government at the December 1972 election.

Anderson was made a Knight Bachelor in 1970 and made a Knight Commander of the Order of the British Empire in 1972.

== Personal life ==
In 1936, Anderson married Madge Merrion, with whom he had one daughter. His wife ran his business while he was on military duties.

Anderson retired to his home at Eastwood and also had a vacation property at Bilgola Beach. He suffered from Alzheimer's disease in his final years and died at a nursing home in Lane Cove on 29 March 1985, aged 75.

== Notes ==
Civic offices
Preceded by E. L. S. Hall	Mayor of Ryde; 1948–1950	Succeeded by H. A. D. Mitchell
New South Wales Legislative Assembly
Preceded by Eric Hearnshaw	Member for Ryde; 1950–1953	Succeeded by Frank Downing
Political offices
Preceded by Denham Henty	Minister for Customs & Excise; 1964–1968	Succeeded by Malcolm Scott
Preceded by Denham Henty	Minister for Supply; 1968–1971	Succeeded by Victor Garland
Preceded by Ivor Greenwood	Minister for Health; 1971–1972	Succeeded by Doug Everingham
Party political offices
Preceded by John Gorton	Leader of the Liberal Party in the Senate; 1968–1972	Succeeded by Reg Withers
