= Edward Sanders (politician) =

Australian politician

Edward Lloyd Sanders (2 December 1888 – 10 July 1943) was an Australian politician.

He was born at Burwood in Sydney to master carrier Edward Ernest Sanders and Jessie Agnes, née Lloyd. He attended Burwood Public School and Sydney Grammar School before working in his father's business and eventually becoming a customs and shipping agent. On 14 October 1911 he married Ethel May Hindmarsh at Gerringong, with whom he had three children. He was elected to the New South Wales Legislative Assembly in 1925 as a Nationalist member for Ryde; when single-member electorates were re-introduced in 1927 he was unable to gain preselection for a seat, but won Willoughby anyway as an independent. Rejoining the Nationalist Party in 1930, he served until his death at North Sydney on 10 July 1943.

New South Wales Legislative Assembly
Preceded by Edward Loxton	Member for Ryde; 1925–1927; Served alongside: Anderson, Bavin, Greig, Henley	Succeeded by Henry McDicken
Preceded by New seat	Member for Willoughby; 1927–1943	Succeeded by George Brain
