= Frank Downing =

Australian politician

Personal details
- Born: 7 March 1907 Tumut, New South Wales
- Died: 22 December 1978 (aged 71) Gladesville, New South Wales
- Party: Labor Party

Francis George (Frank) Downing (7 March 1907 – 22 December 1978) was an Australian politician and an ALP member of the New South Wales Legislative Assembly from 1953 until 1968.

Downing was born in Tumut, New South Wales and was the son of a council worker. He was the brother of Reg Downing, whose three-decade-long career in the NSW legislature included service as Attorney-General; Thomas O'Mara, another parliamentarian, was a cousin.

Educated at St Joseph's College, Hunters Hill, Frank initially worked as a timber-worker before becoming an official in the Australian Timber Workers Union. His first attempt to enter parliament (in 1950) was unsuccessful; but he became the ALP member for Ryde at the 1953 state election, defeating the incumbent Liberal representative, Ken Anderson.

In the elections of 1956, 1959, 1962, and 1965, Downing retained the seat, which was abolished in 1968. During that year, he tried to gain the newly created electorate of Fuller. This time he lost to the Liberal candidate, future party leader Peter Coleman. Thereafter Downing retired from public life. He was the chairman of caucus in 1959 but did not hold any ministerial office.

New South Wales Legislative Assembly
Preceded by Ken Anderson	Member for Ryde; 1953 – 1968	Succeeded by seat abolished
