= David Anderson (Australian politician) =

Australian politician

Member of the New South Wales Parliament for Ryde
- In office 20 March 1920 – 7 September 1927 Serving with Bavin, Greig, Henley, Loxton/Sanders
- Preceded by: William Thompson
- Succeeded by: Henry McDicken

Member of the New South Wales Parliament for Eastwood
- In office 8 October 1927 – 18 September 1930
- Preceded by: New creation
- Succeeded by: Seat abolished

Personal details
- Born: David More Anderson; 2 February 1865 Glasgow, Scotland
- Died: 11 February 1936 (aged 71) Ryde, New South Wales, Australia
- Resting place: Field of Mars Cemetery
- Party: Nationalist Party of Australia
- Children: Ken Anderson

David More Anderson (2 February 1865 – 11 February 1936) was an Australian politician.

He was born at Glasgow, Scotland, to master painter Archibald Anderson and Elizabeth Buchanan, née More. He arrived in Australia in 1884, finding work as a grocer, agent and auctioneer in the Leichhardt area of Sydney. Around 1891 he married Emily Amelia Ely Linderman, with whom he had two children; he would later marry Florence May McWhirter and have a further six children. In 1896 he moved to Gladesville and in 1905 to Ryde, serving as an alderman on Ryde Municipal Council from 1896 to 1919 (mayor 1904, 1908, 1913). He continued to work in the real estate and auctioneering business, and also established a brickworks in 1910. In 1920 he was elected to the New South Wales Legislative Assembly as a Nationalist member for Ryde. With the reintroduction of single-member districts in 1927 he was elected as the member for Eastwood, but he was defeated in 1930. Anderson died at Ryde in 1936.

Civic offices
Preceded by Edward Betts	Mayor of Ryde; 1904–1905	Succeeded by William Thompson
Preceded by Sidney Benson	Mayor of Ryde; 1908–1909	Succeeded by John Redshaw
Preceded by Charles Robert Summerhayes	Mayor of Ryde; 1913–1914	Succeeded by Rowland Sutton
New South Wales Legislative Assembly
Preceded by William Thompson	Member for Ryde; 1920–1927; Served alongside: Bavin, Greig, Henley, Loxton/Sanders	Succeeded by Henry McDicken
New district	Member for Eastwood; 1927–1930	District abolished
