= Cecil Monro =

Australian politician

Member of the New South Wales Legislative Assembly for Sutherland
- In office 17 June 1950 – 14 January 1953
- Preceded by: New seat
- Succeeded by: Tom Dalton

Member of the New South Wales Legislative Assembly for Georges River
- In office 11 June 1932 – 18 April 1941
- Preceded by: Ted Kinsella
- Succeeded by: Arthur Williams

Personal details
- Born: 8 April 1883 North Sydney, New South Wales
- Died: 1 May 1966 (aged 83) Cronulla, New South Wales
- Party: Nationalist (until 1931); United Australia Party (1931—1945); Liberal Party (from 1945)
- Occupation: Estate agent, publican

Cecil Owen James Monro (8 April 1883 – 1 May 1966) was an Australian politician and a member of the New South Wales Legislative Assembly between 1932 and 1941 and 1950–53. He was a member of the Nationalist, the United Australia Party and the Liberal Party.

== Early life ==
Monro was born in North Sydney, New South Wales. He was the son of a timber merchant, and was educated at Kogarah Public School and The Scots College. He initially worked as a clerk but later owned a real estate agency, hotels and an auctioneering business. He was involved in community groups in the Cronulla region including Rotary and the Cronulla Surf Life Saving Club.

He was the licensee of Hotel Cecil, Cronulla from 1928 until 1934 and was an executive officer in a number of local organisations including Cronulla Surf Club, Legacy, Parents and Citizens' Association and Scouts. He also served as trustee of National Park in 1939 and president of Georges River Bridge and Railway League.

== Political career ==
Monro was elected to Sutherland Shire Council in 1914 and served as Shire President from 1917 to 1918 and again from 1922. In 1925, he was a Nationalist candidate for St George at the state election that year but was not elected. His tenure as Shire President concluded in 1928 but he continued to serve on Council, with the exception of a one-month gap in service in 1929. In 1930, he was the Nationalist candidate for Georges River at the state election that year but was not elected.

After two unsuccessful attempts, Monro was elected to the New South Wales Parliament as the United Australia Party member for Georges River in 1932. He defeated the sitting Labor member Ted Kinsella at the landslide that swept away the government of Jack Lang. In 1939, he was elected to serve a further year as Shire President.

Monro retained the seat until the 1941 election, when his defeat by Labor's Arthur Williams contributed to the fall of the conservative coalition government of Bertram Stevens. Later that year, his tenure on Sutherland Shire Council came to an end.

Monro was elected to Sutherland Shire Council again in 1948. In 1949, he regained the position of Shire President, a role he would retain for three years. He re-entered parliament as the Liberal member for the new seat of Sutherland at the 1950 state election. In a result which had a major influence on the course of Australian history, he defeated the Labor candidate Gough Whitlam. Whitlam subsequently turned his attention to Federal politics and became the Prime Minister of Australia between 1972 and 1975. Monro was defeated at the next election in 1953 and his second tenure on Sutherland Shire Council ended later the same year and he retired from public life. He did not hold a ministerial, party or parliamentary position.

New South Wales Legislative Assembly
Preceded by Ted Kinsella	Member for Georges River; 1932 – 1941	Succeeded by Arthur Williams
Preceded by New seat	Member for Sutherland; 1950 – 1953	Succeeded by Tom Dalton
