= Edward Loxton =

Australian politician

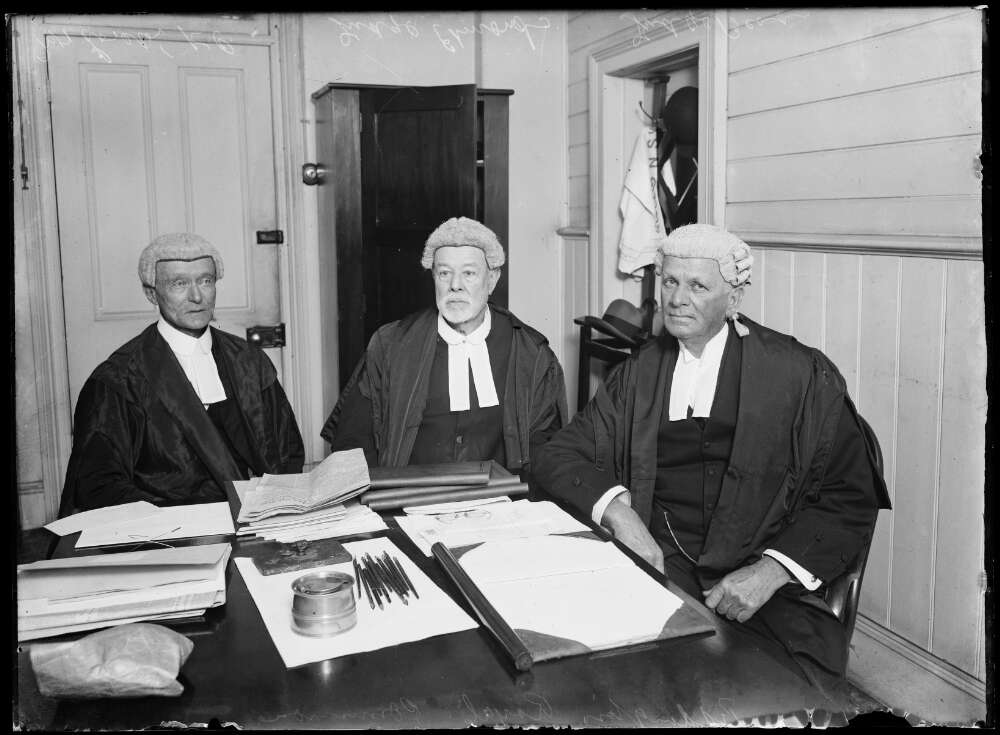
Edward Loxton KC (centre) during the Royal Commission into AB Piddington Sydney 1927

Edward James Loxton KC (11 October 1864 – 17 February 1935) was an Australian politician.

He was born at Neutral Bay to Thomas Loxton and Lucinda Jane, née Forster. After attending Sydney Grammar School and the University of Sydney (BA 1886, MA 1888), he was articled to the solicitors' firm Allen & Allen, qualifying but not seeking admission as a solicitor. In 1891, he married Jane Rosa Marshall, with whom he had five children.

Loxton was called to the Bar in 1892 and practised in the Equity Court. In the late 1910s, he became active in political campaigns, strongly supporting conscription and six o'clock closing of public bars. He was elected in 1920 to the New South Wales Legislative Assembly as an independent Nationalist member for Ryde, but joined the Nationalist Party in 1922, serving in parliament until 1925. He died in Sydney in 1935.

New South Wales Legislative Assembly
Preceded by William Thompson	Member for Ryde; 1920–1925; Served alongside: Anderson, Bavin, Greig, Henley	Succeeded by Edward Sanders
