= Eric Hearnshaw =

Australian politician

Eric Hearnshaw MM

Personal details
- Born: 21 May 1893 Sheffield, England
- Died: 20 July 1967 (aged 74) Beecroft, New South Wales
- Party: Liberal Party

Eric Hearnshaw (21 May 1893 – 20 July 1967) was an Australian politician and a member of the New South Wales Legislative Assembly from 1945 until 1965. He was a member of the Liberal Party.

Hearnshaw was born in Sheffield, England, the son of a tool manufacturer, and was educated to elementary level. He came to Australia as an assisted migrant in 1914 and was initially trained to be a farmer. Hearnshaw served in the First Australian Imperial Force in the Middle East between 1915 and 1919 and was awarded the Military Medal. After repatriation, he studied accountancy and public administration and was employed in public and private practice as an administrator. He was involved in community groups in the Ryde region including Legacy, Rotary and the Freemasons.

Hearnshaw was elected to the New South Wales Parliament as the Liberal Party member for Ryde at the 1945 by-election in February, which was caused by the death of the sitting, independent conservative member James Shand. As parliamentary members of the Democratic Party had yet to join the Liberal Party, Hearnshaw was the first Liberal Party member in the New South Wales parliament. Hearnshaw retained the seat at the 1947 election and transferred to the new seat of Eastwood at the 1950 state election. He retained this seat for the Liberal party at the next 4 elections but lost pre-selection prior to the 1965 election. During this time, he was the opposition whip from 1959 till 1965. His wife, Marion Hearnshaw, unsuccessfully contested the seat at that election.

Eric Hearnshaw's son was the acclaimed Australian film maker Philip Hearnshaw.

New South Wales Legislative Assembly
| Preceded by James Shand | Member for Ryde; 1945 – 1950 | Succeeded by Ken Anderson |
| Preceded by Recreated seat | Member for Eastwood; 1950 – 1965 | Succeeded by Jim Clough |
