= Evan Davies (New South Wales politician) =

Australian politician

Evan Alexander Davies (25 June 1889 – 11 February 1948) was an Australian politician. He was a Labor Party member of the New South Wales Legislative Assembly from 1930 until 1932, representing the electorate of Ryde.

Davies was born in Abertillery in Wales, and migrated to Australia in 1920. He worked as a miner on the Southern coalfields, and served as councillor and vice-president of the Southern Districts Miners' Federation. He subsequently moved to Ryde, where he was active in Labor politics as a member of the party's Gladesville branch and Ryde electorate council.

Davies entered state politics at the 1930 election, when he won the Nationalist-held seat of Ryde amidst Labor's major election victory under Jack Lang. His career was to be short-lived, however; Davies lost his seat to the United Australia Party's Eric Spooner in 1932, one of many Labor MLAs to lose their seats that year amidst a devastating Labor loss, following Lang's dismissal as Premier by the state Governor. He again contested Ryde in 1935, but lost to Spooner a second time.

Later in life Davies was the licensee of the Albion Hotel at Armidale. He died at Armidale in 1948.

New South Wales Legislative Assembly
Preceded by Henry McDicken	Member for Ryde; 1930–1932	Succeeded by Eric Spooner
