= Electoral district of Eastwood =

Former state electoral district of New South Wales, Australia

Eastwood was an electoral district of the Legislative Assembly in the Australian state of New South Wales from 1927 to 1930 and from 1950 to 1999. It included Eastwood. In its second incarnation, it was a comfortably safe seat for the Liberal Party.

It was abolished in 1999, and mostly replaced by Epping.

== Members for Eastwood ==
First incarnation (1927–1930)
Member	Party	Term
David Anderson	Nationalist	1927–1930
Second incarnation (1950–1999)
Member	Party	Term
Eric Hearnshaw	Liberal	1950–1965
Jim Clough	Liberal	1965–1988
Andrew Tink	Liberal	1988–1999

== Election results ==
1995 New South Wales state election: Eastwood
Party	Candidate	Votes	%	±%
Liberal	Andrew Tink	18,867	55.7	−6.7
Labor	Steve Gurney	8,981	26.5	+1.6
Greens	Alex Lepelaar	2,124	6.3	+6.3
Democrats	Chris Dunkerley	2,051	6.1	−2.7
Against Further Immigration	Rodney Smith	1,667	4.9	+4.9
Natural Law	Tim Carr	192	0.6	+0.6
Total formal votes		33,882	96.3	+2.9
Informal votes		1,306	3.7	−2.9
Turnout		35,188	93.6	
Two-party-preferred result
Liberal	Andrew Tink	20,649	64.2	−4.5
Labor	Steve Gurney	11,507	35.8	+4.5
Liberal hold		Swing	−4.5	
