= Arthur Williams (Australian politician) =

Australian politician

Personal details
- Born: 17 December 1888 Paddington, New South Wales
- Died: 30 September 1968 (aged 79) Springwood, New South Wales
- Party: Labor Party

Arthur John Leonard Williams (17 December 1888 – 30 September 1968) was an Australian politician and a member of the New South Wales Legislative Assembly from 1940 until 1956. He was a member of the Labor Party (ALP).

Williams was born in Paddington, New South Wales and was the son of a hotel broker. He was educated at the Marist Brothers' School, Paddington and qualified as an accountant, opening his own accountancy company and specialising in the auditing of trade unions. Williams was elected to the parliament as the Labor member for Ryde at the 1940 by-election caused by the resignation of the United Australia Party member, Eric Spooner who successfully contested the seat of Robertson at the 1940 federal election. He defeated the UAP candidate by 220 votes. At the 1941 election, following an unfavourable redistribution Williams chose to contest the safer seat of Georges River. He defeated the sitting UAP member Cecil Monro and held the seat until the 1953 election when, after a further redistribution, he successfully contested the new seat of East Hills. Williams retired from public life at the next election in 1956. He did not hold party, parliamentary or ministerial office.

New South Wales Legislative Assembly
Preceded by Eric Spooner	Member for Ryde; 1940 – 1941	Succeeded by James Shand
Preceded by Cecil Monro	Member for Georges River; 1941 – 1953	Succeeded by Frank O'Neill
Preceded by new seat	Member for East Hills; 1953 – 1956	Succeeded by Joe Kelly
