= Edward Terry (politician) =

Australian politician

Edward Terry (3 February 1840 – 19 November 1907) was an Australian politician.

Born at Box Hill near Rouse Hill to landowner John Terry and Eleanor Rouse, he married Isabel Benson, with whom he had thirteen children. He owned the Eastwood Estate from around 1863 and built a racecourse at Eastwood. He was an alderman at Ryde from 1871 and served as mayor (1871–73, 1875–76, 1899). He was the member for Ryde in the New South Wales Legislative Assembly from 1898 to 1901 and again from January to July 1904, both times as an Independent Protectionist. Terry died at Eastwood in 1907.

Civic offices
New title	Mayor of Ryde; 1871–1874	Succeeded by Gerrard Herring
Preceded by Gerrard Herring	Mayor of Ryde; 1875–1876	Succeeded by Gerrard Herring
Preceded by Edward Worthington	Mayor of Ryde; 1899	Succeeded by Walter Hibble
New South Wales Legislative Assembly
Preceded by Frank Farnell	Member for Ryde; 1898–1901	Succeeded by Frank Farnell
Preceded by Frank Farnell	Member for Ryde; 1904	District abolished
