= Ted Kinsella =

Australian politician and judge

Edward Parnell Kinsella CBE (10 June 1893 – 20 December 1967) was an Australian politician and judge.

He was born in Glen Innes to Patrick Kinsella and Mary Jane, née Sharman. He attended St Patrick's College in Goulburn and was employed as a cadet draftsman with the Lands Department in Wagga Wagga, Moree and Sydney from 1910 to 1914. During World War I he served in the 2nd, 54th and 56th Battalions, seeing action at Gallipoli and Flanders and rising to the rank of lieutenant. On 2 August 1919 he married Marie Louise Graff, with whom he had five children. After the war Kinsella returned to the Lands Department and studied law part-time at the University of Sydney, graduating with his Bachelor of Law in 1927, in which year he was called to the Bar. In 1930 he was elected to the New South Wales Legislative Assembly as the Labor member for Georges River, but he was defeated in 1932. He was appointed a District Court judge in 1943 and in that year was also appointed to the Industrial Commission of NSW. He served as a judge of the Supreme Court of New South Wales from 1950 to 1963. Kinsella was appointed a Commander of the Order of the British Empire in 1964. He died in Sydney in 1967.

New South Wales Legislative Assembly
Preceded by New seat	Member for Georges River; 1930–1932	Succeeded by Cecil Monro
