= Electoral district of Georges River =

Former state electoral district of New South Wales, Australia

Georges River was an electoral district of the Legislative Assembly in the Australian state of New South Wales from 1930 to 2007. It was replaced by Oatley.

== Members for Georges River ==
Member	Party	Period
Ted Kinsella	Labor	1930–1932
Cecil Monro	United Australia	1932–1941
Arthur Williams	Labor	1941–1953
Frank O'Neill	Labor	1953–1956
Douglas Cross	Liberal	1956–1970
Frank Walker	Labor	1970–1988
Terry Griffiths	Liberal	1988–1994
Terry Griffiths	Independent	1994–1995
Marie Ficarra	Liberal	1995–1999
Kevin Greene	Labor	1999–2007

== Election results ==
2003 New South Wales state election: Georges River
Party	Candidate	Votes	%	±%
Labor	Kevin Greene	21,840	52.4	+5.3
Liberal	Joanne McCafferty	13,148	31.5	−5.4
Greens	Christine Welsh	2,504	6.0	+3.0
Unity	John Lau	1,872	4.5	+2.5
Independent	Michele Adair	1,246	3.0	+3.0
Against Further Immigration	Francis Bush	577	1.4	−0.6
One Nation	Mary Kennedy	529	1.3	−4.0
Total formal votes		24,628	97.7	−0.1
Informal votes		1,002	2.3	+0.1
Turnout		42,718	92.7	
Two-party-preferred result
Labor	Kevin Greene	24,628	63.7	+7.4
Liberal	Joanne McCafferty	14,054	36.3	−7.4
Labor hold		Swing	+7.4	
