= Electoral district of Ryde =

State electoral district of New South Wales, Australia

Ryde New South Wales—Legislative Assembly
- Interactive map of district boundaries from the 2023 state election
- State: New South Wales
- Dates current: 1894–1904; 1913–1968; 1981–1991; 1999–present
- MP: Jordan Lane
- Party: Liberal
- Namesake: Ryde
- Electors: 54,881 (2019)
- Area: 28.23 km^{2} (10.9 sq mi)
- Demographic: Inner-metropolitan
Electorates around Ryde:
Epping	Wahroonga	Wahroonga
Parramatta	Ryde	Lane Cove
Parramatta	Drummoyne	Lane Cove

Ryde is an electoral district of the Legislative Assembly of the Australian state of New South Wales. It is on the north bank of the Parramatta River, stretching from Meadowbank in the south to Marsfield in the north.

Since 2023 the member for Ryde has been Jordan Lane of the Liberal Party.

== History ==
Ryde was created originally in 1894 with the abolition of multi-member districts, from part of Central Cumberland and named after and including Ryde. It was abolished in 1904 with the downsizing of the Legislative Assembly after Federation, but recreated in 1913. In 1920, the electoral districts of Ryde, Burwood, Drummoyne, Gordon and Willoughby were combined to create a new incarnation of Ryde, which elected five members by proportional representation.

This was replaced by single-member electorates, including Ryde, Burwood, Drummoyne, Eastwood, Gordon and Willoughby for the 1927 election. Ryde was abolished in 1968, being partly replaced by Yaralla and Fuller. In 1981 Ryde was recreated from the part of the abolished district of Yaralla north of the Parramatta River and part of the abolished district of Fuller. In 1991, Ryde was abolished again, but in 1999, Gladesville and Eastwood were abolished and largely replaced by a fourth incarnation of Ryde and Epping.

In its previous incarnations, Ryde was a marginal seat that frequently traded hands between Labor and the conservative parties. In its current incarnation, Ryde was originally a safe Labor seat before a massive swing to the Liberals at a 2008 by-election made it a safe Liberal seat. Dominello currently holds it with a majority of 11.5 percent. On 17 August 2022, Dominello announced his plan to retire at the upcoming state election. At the election in March, the Liberal candidate, Jordan Lane, won by a two-party preferred margin of 50 votes. The result was so close, a recount was held on 15 April which increased Lane's margin to 54 votes.

== Geography ==
On its current boundaries, Ryde includes the suburbs and localities of Denistone, Denistone East, Denistone West, Macquarie Park, Marsfield, Meadowbank, Melrose Park, Ryde, North Ryde, West Ryde; and parts of Eastwood and Epping. Its northern border follows the Lane Cove River.

== Members for Ryde ==
1894–1904, 1 member
Member	Party	Term												
Frank Farnell	Free Trade	1894–1898												
Edward Terry	Ind. Protectionist	1898–1901												
Frank Farnell	Independent Liberal	1901–1903												
Edward Terry	Independent Liberal	1904–1904												
1913–1920, 1 member
Member	Party	Term												
William Thompson	Liberal Reform	1913–1917												
William Thompson	Nationalist	1917–1920												
1920–1927, 5 members
Member	Party	Term	Member	Party	Term	Member	Party	Term	Member	Party	Term	Member	Party	Term
Edward Loxton	Ind. Nationalist	1920–1922	David Anderson	Nationalist	1920–1927	Thomas Bavin	Progressive	1920–1922	Sir Thomas Henley	Nationalist	1920–1927	Robert Greig	Labor	1920–1927
Edward Loxton	Nationalist	1922–1925	David Anderson	Nationalist	1920–1927	Thomas Bavin	Nationalist	1922–1927	Sir Thomas Henley	Nationalist	1920–1927	Robert Greig	Labor	1920–1927
Edward Sanders	Nationalist	1925–1927	David Anderson	Nationalist	1920–1927	Thomas Bavin	Nationalist	1922–1927	Sir Thomas Henley	Nationalist	1920–1927	Robert Greig	Labor	1920–1927
1927–1968, 1 member
Member	Party	Term												
Henry McDicken	Labor	1927–1930												
Evan Davies	Labor	1930–1932												
Eric Spooner	United Australia	1932–1940												
Arthur Williams	Labor	1940–1941												
James Shand	Ind. United Australia	1941–1944												
Eric Hearnshaw	Liberal	1945–1950												
Ken Anderson	Liberal	1950–1953												
Frank Downing	Labor	1953–1968												
1981–1991, 1 member
Member	Party	Term												
Garry McIlwaine	Labor	1981–1988												
Michael Photios	Liberal	1988–1991												
1999–present, 1 member
Member	Party	Term												
John Watkins	Labor	1999–2008												
Victor Dominello	Liberal	2008–2023												
Jordan Lane	Liberal	2023–present												

== Election results ==
2023 New South Wales state election: Ryde
Party	Candidate	Votes	%	±%
Liberal	Jordan Lane	24,383	45.3	−4.4
Labor	Lyndal Howison	21,004	39.0	+8.6
Greens	Sophie Edington	5,772	10.7	+2.0
Sustainable Australia	Bradley Jelfs	1,357	2.5	+0.9
Informed Medical Options	Barry Devine	1,324	2.5	+2.5
Total formal votes		53,840	97.4	+0.1
Informal votes		1,441	2.6	−0.1
Turnout		55,281	89.4	+0.8
Two-party-preferred result
Liberal	Jordan Lane	25,431	50.1	−8.9
Labor	Lyndal Howison	25,377	49.9	+8.9
Liberal hold		Swing	−8.9	
