= Henry McDicken =

Australian politician

Henry James McDicken (27 September 1874 – 20 October 1944) was an Australian politician, elected as a member of the New South Wales Legislative Assembly.

== Early years ==
Born, Henry James Argue McDicken in Newcastle, New South Wales, he was the third child of Isabella Agnes Argue, an emigrant from Ireland, and Hugh McDicken, a compositor from India, who had been engaged by Sir Henry Parkes when he founded The Empire newspaper in 1850.

In 1900, Henry McDicken married Lydia Gillard, with whom he had 4 children. He is survived by one grandson. A builder by trade, McDicken served in the First Australian Imperial Force 9th Field Coy Engineers during World War I. From 1908 to 1914 and from 1920 to 1928, he was an alderman on the Drummoyne Council, serving as Mayor in 1913 and 1920.

== Political career ==
He was a Labor Member of the New South Wales Legislative Assembly, representing the seat of Ryde, from 1927 to 1930 and the seat of Concord from 1930 to 1932. He also stood as the Labor candidate for the seat of Martin in the 1925 and 1934 Federal elections.

He died in the Sydney suburb of Ashfield.

New South Wales Legislative Assembly
Preceded by Five members	Member for Ryde; 1927 – 1930	Succeeded by Evan Davies
New district	Member for Concord; 1930 – 1932	Succeeded by Stan Lloyd
