= Marginal seat =

Term in electoral politics

A marginal seat or swing seat is a constituency held with a small majority in a legislative election, generally one conducted under a single-winner voting system. In Canada, they may be known as target ridings. The opposite is a safe seat. The term ultra-marginal seat refers to a constituency with a majority of single digits, usually within a percentage of 2%.

Examples of traditionally marginal seats in the United Kingdom include Broxtowe, Watford, Bolton West and Thurrock. In Australia, marginal seats include Lindsay in New South Wales, Bass in Tasmania, Longman in Queensland and Corangamite in Victoria. Ultra-marginal seats in Australia include the federal seat of Gilmore in New South Wales and the state seats of Bundaberg in Queensland and Kogarah in New South Wales.

== Examples ==
=== Australia ===
The Australian Electoral Commission defines seat margins as follows:

Winning 2PP vote	Margin	Classification
Under 56%	0 to 12 pp	Marginal
56% to 60%	12 to 20 pp	Fairly safe
Over 60%	Over 20 pp	Safe

==== Federal ====
Following the 2022 federal election, 51 of the 151 seats in the House of Representatives are considered "marginal". The most marginal is the Division of Gilmore in New South Wales, held by the Labor Party on a margin of 0.17% against the Liberal Party. This seat was retained by Labor by just over 300 votes.

==== New South Wales ====
Following the 2023 state election, 18 of the 93 seats in the New South Wales Legislative Assembly are marginal seats. The most marginal is Ryde, held by the Liberal Party on a margin of 0.01% against the Labor Party. This seat was won by Jordan Lane by just 50 votes on the first count (and 54 on the recount), successfully succeeding outgoing Liberal MP Victor Dominello. It is believed that the seat became marginal due to the Dominello's departure, due to his popularity in the area.

==== Northern Territory ====
Following the 2024 general election, eight of the 25 seats in the Northern Territory Legislative Assembly are marginal seats. The most marginal is Nightcliff, held by the Greens on a margin of 0.4% against the Labor Party, who lost the seat by just 36 votes.

==== Queensland ====
Following the 2020 state election, 29 of the 93 seats in the Legislative Assembly of Queensland are marginal seats. The most marginal is the Bundaberg, held by the Labor Party on a margin of 0.01% against the Liberal National Party, who lost the seat by just nine votes.

==== South Australia ====
Following the 2022 state election, 17 of the 47 seats in the South Australian Legislative Assembly are marginal seats. The most marginal is Dunstan, held by the Liberal Party on a margin of 0.8% against the Labor Party. Notably, this seat is held by former Liberal leader Steven Marshall, who was also the state's Premier until this election.

==== Victoria ====
Following the 2022 state election, 28 of the 88 seats in the Victorian Legislative Assembly are marginal seats. The two most marginal are Bass and Northcote, both of which are held by the Labor Party on a margin of 0.2% against the Liberal Party and the Greens, respectively.

==== Western Australia ====
Following the 2021 state election, just five of the 59 seats in the Western Australian Legislative Assembly are marginal seats. The most marginal is Churchlands, held by the Labor Party on a margin of 0.8% against the Liberal Party.

=== Indonesia ===
A marginal electoral district is formed when strong, well known candidates had gathered around in a single electoral district. An electoral district in Indonesia possesses a limited amount of seats to be elected as a member of House of Representatives, forcing each candidates to fight hard against one another disregarding any coalition lines to seek votes. Well known marginal districts include:

- Jakarta II electoral district that covers South Jakarta, Central Jakarta and overseas voters. It is often contested by well known figures such as Hidayat Nur Wahid, Once Mekel and Tsamara Amany.
- Yogyakarta electoral district which covers the Special Region of Yogyakarta with only 8 seats often contested by figures such as Roy Suryo, Titiek Suharto, Ahmad Hanafi Rais (son of Amien Rais) and others.
- North Sumatra I electoral district that covers most of Medan metropolitan area with 10 seats allocated. This electoral district is often hotly contested with figures such as Yasonna Laoly, Ruhut Sitompul, Meutya Hafid, and Musa Rajekshah.

=== United States ===
In the United States, examples of congressional districts considered marginal as of 2018 include Illinois's 10th congressional district, located in the northern suburbs of Chicago, Texas's 23rd congressional district, covering most of Texas's border with Mexico, and New Hampshire's 1st congressional district, which includes much of the state's eastern half, including its most populous city Manchester. In the 2010s, these three districts frequently switched partisan control and had close races, making them examples of marginal seats.

However, political realignments and redistricting may cause traditionally marginal districts to become safe for one party or another. An example of the former is Indiana's 8th congressional district, which was nicknamed the "Bloody Eighth" for its history of ousting incumbents from both the Democratic and Republican parties. However, as rural white voters, who are a large percentage of the district's population as of 2018, became increasingly Republican, it is considered a safely Republican seat as of 2018. On the other hand, North Carolina's 11th congressional district is an example of a seat that lost its marginal status due to redistricting. It was formerly a highly competitive seat, albeit with a slight Republican lean, that often changed partisan hands. The Democratic base in the district was the city of Asheville, while Republicans were dominant in much of the city's suburbs, and the mountainous rural areas were evenly split between the two parties. However, the Republican-controlled North Carolina legislature redrew the district in 2012 to remove much of Asheville and add Republican-leaning territory from the adjacent 10th district, therefore making the district much more difficult to win for three-term incumbent Heath Shuler, a conservative Democrat. Indeed, Shuler opted to retire, and Republican Mark Meadows won the seat easily. The seat remained occupied by a Republican until the next redistricting.

Conversely, seats that were formerly considered safe for one party may become swing seats. For instance, Orange County, California, was traditionally a Republican stronghold, and most of its congressional seats were solidly Republican for decades. However, demographic changes, particularly Democratic strength with Hispanic and Asian voters, have eroded Republican dominance of the county as of 2018; Hillary Clinton won it in 2016, becoming the first Democratic presidential nominee to do so since Franklin D. Roosevelt in 1936, while Democrats, for the first time in many years, swept all of its congressional seats in the 2018 midterms.

Marginal seats only require a small swing to change hands and therefore are typically the focus of most campaign resources. The concentration of money and human resources in areas where they will make the most difference is known as targeting.

== Strategies for securing marginal seats ==
The creation of policy that will benefit a particular seat, at the expense of other taxpayers, is known as pork barreling.

Political parties often face tension between the holders of marginal seats and safe seats. Safe seats tend to be allocated far less discretionary resources—governmental as well as political—from their political party than do marginal seats.

A similar phenomenon happens in United States presidential elections, where the Electoral College system means that candidates must win states rather than the popular vote. Again, resources are concentrated towards the swing states with the smallest majorities.

== See also ==
- Bellwether
- Swing vote
