= Ryde Civic Centre =

Civic building in Ryde, New South Wales, Australia

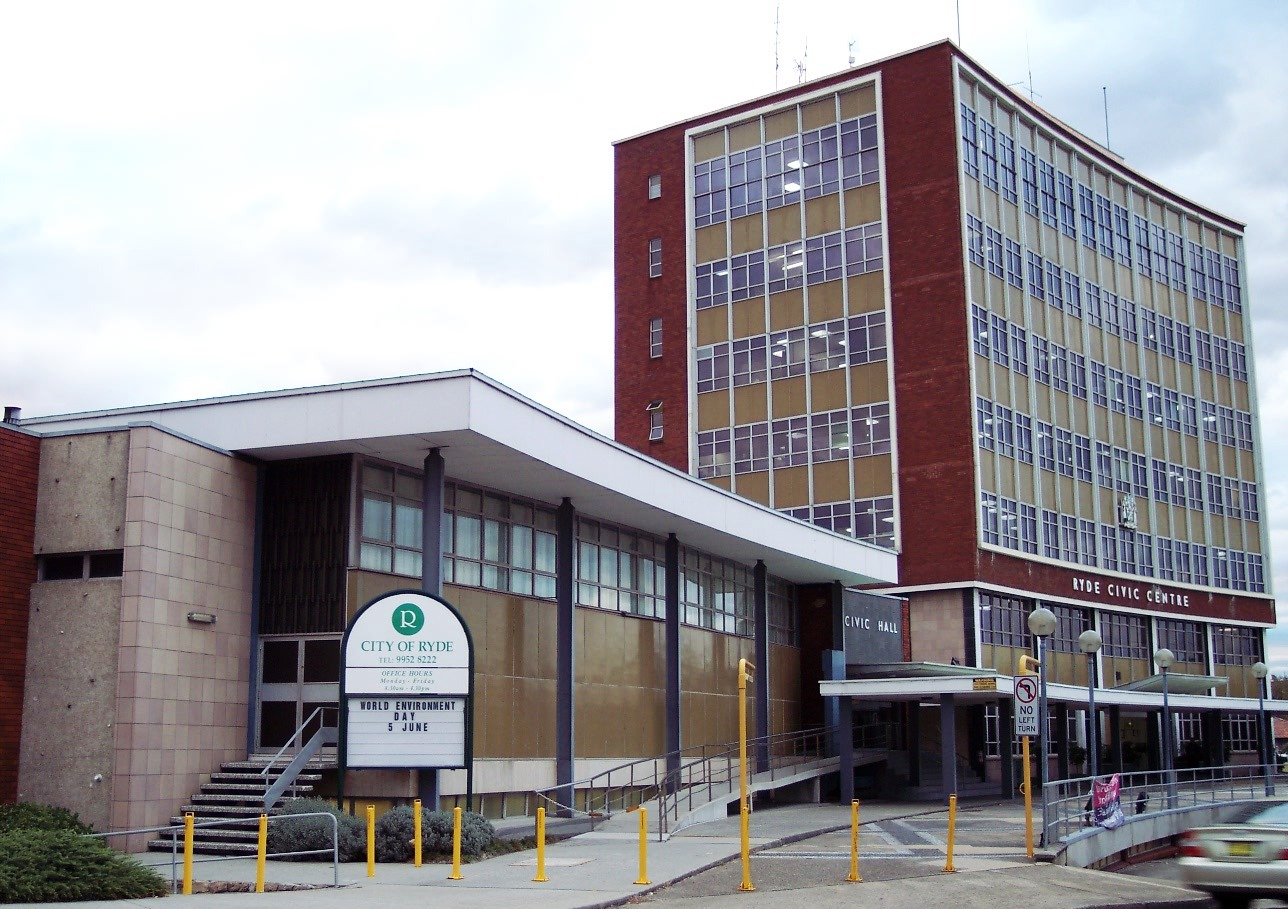
- Ryde Civic Centre, with the Civic hall on the left
- Alternative names: Ryde Civic Hall, Ryde Civic Hub

General information
- Status: Demolished
- Type: Government town hall
- Architectural style: Post-War International
- Location: 1 Devlin Street, Ryde, New South Wales, Australia
- Completed: 15 August 1964
- Client: Municipality of Ryde
- Owner: City of Ryde

Design and construction
- Architects: Leslie J. Buckland; C. Druce
- Architecture firm: Buckland & Druce
- Main contractor: James S Sampson

The Ryde Civic Centre was a legacy 1960's modernist civic building in Ryde, Sydney, Australia. It stood as a local landmark in the centre of Ryde on land originally known as Hattons Flat, along Devlin Street. Designed in the Post-War International Style by Buckland & Druce architects, the Civic Centre was the seat of the City of Ryde from its opening in 1964, and was extended in 1972 to include the Civic Hall as an event and function space. It had been nominated multiple times for heritage listing but no serious investigation of its significance was ever undertaken. Possibly of State significance, its significance had been much debated. The demolition of the Parramatta Civic Centre (also a Buckland and Druce commission) was approved on the basis that the Ryde Civic Centre was a far better example. The Ryde Civic Centre was the only known surviving example of a mid 20th century Post War Civic Centre and Council administration building in New South Wales. The Civic Centre remained the council seat until 2016, when the main building was closed allegedly due to maintenance and safety issues. Demolition and redevelopment of the Ryde Civic Centre has been a hotly debated political issue for the council. In 2019 Council lodged and approved a proposal to redevelop the Civic Centre site as the "New Heart of Ryde" designed by Plus Architecture, with Taylor Construction Group tendered as the builders in early 2020. In 2021, the Civic Centre, along with the Civic Hall was demolished to make way for the New Heart of Ryde.

== History ==
Designed in the Post-War International style by Leslie J. Buckland & Druce architects, who designed the Parramatta City Council Administration Building (1959) and Library (1964), the Civic Centre, with its curtain wall facade, was noted for its similarity to the 1962 AMP Building (by Graham Thorp of Peddle Thorp Walker) in Circular Quay.

The council last met at the Council Chambers on Blaxland Road on 4 August 1964, with the mayor, C. M. Cutler, declaring that there had been “tremendous advances in the municipality”. The Civic Centre was officially opened on 15 August 1964 by the Premier of New South Wales, Jack Renshaw.

== Redevelopment and future ==
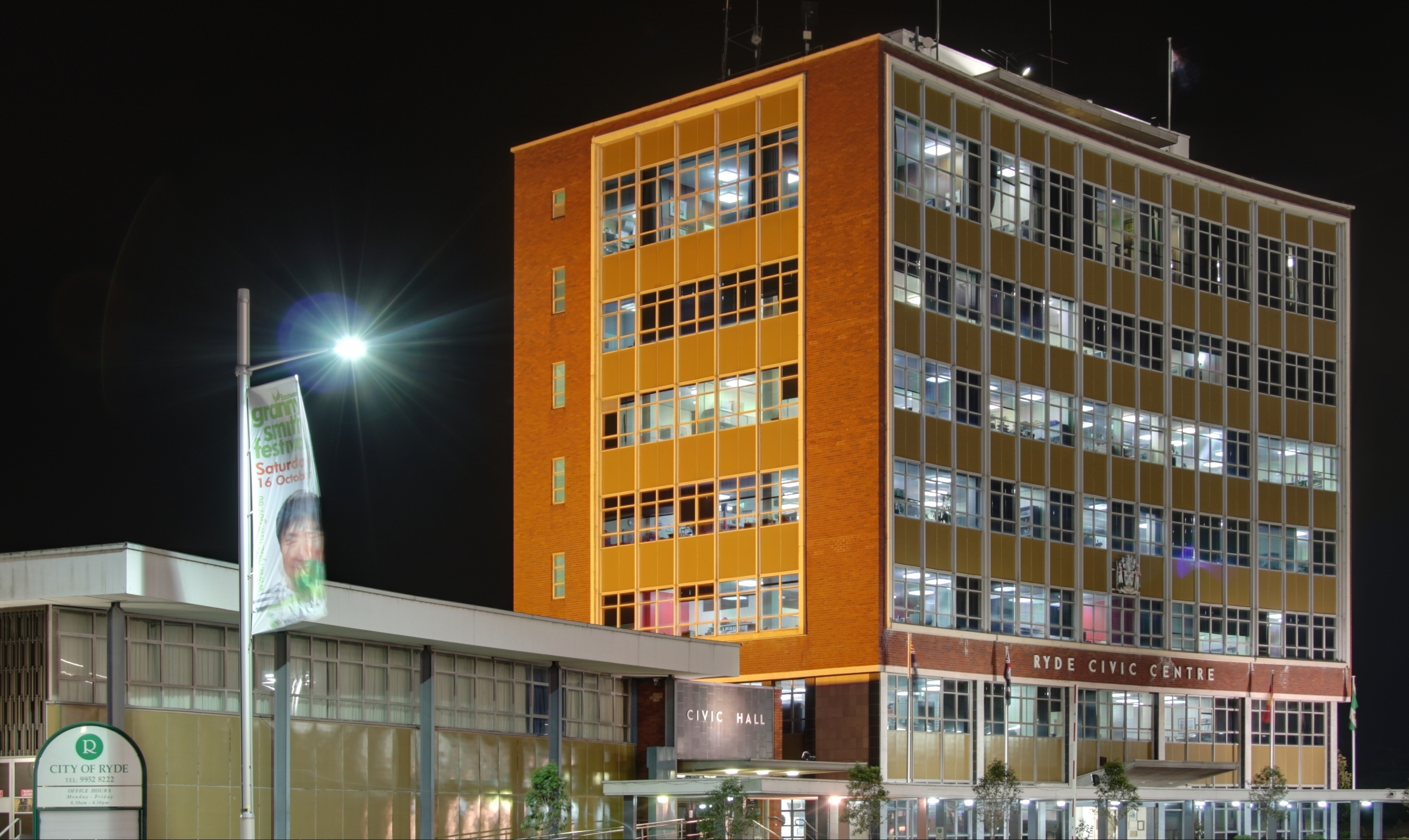
Civic Centre at night, 2010.

Described in The Sydney Morning Herald in 2011 as an "ugly, unloved building", the Civic Centre was identified for redevelopment since 2011. However a newly elected council resolved in September 2012 not to proceed further. In November 2012, the council supported the rezoning of the Civic Centre site back to community space but this was overturned by the Liberal-majority council seven votes to five in mid-2015.

In June 2015 council voted to spend $771,000 on an international design competition for the future of the site of the Civic Centre, with the Liberal mayor, Bill Pickering, noting that safety concerns had prompted further action, calling the building a “dinosaur” that was “falling down around [their] ears.” Ryde Council first met in new chambers across the road from the Civic Centre in Top Ryde on 27 September 2016. In August 2016, the Design Our Ryde international architectural competition for the Ryde Civic Hub Precinct was won by the Beijing Institute of Architectural Design, a state-owned architectural firm in China.

With the election in September 2017 of a new council with a majority opposed to the redevelopment plans, the "Civic Hub" proposal was overturned. The design competition-winning proposal was rejected in December 2017, with the new Labor Mayor, Jerome Laxale, explaining that “the winning entry from the International Design Competition has proved to be unworkable, as predicted at its inception [...] The design competition itself has wasted well over $1 million in ratepayers money and our community has rejected 500 to 600 apartments time and time again.” Laxale also commissioned council staff to prepare a report on "a feasible new Civic Centre which will include council chambers, administrative space, meeting rooms, a performance space and retail space".

=== The New Heart of Ryde ===
In mid-2019, the Ryde Council endorsed a Development Application lodged in January 2019 for a new proposal for the Civic Centre site designed by Plus Architecture entitled "The New Heart of Ryde", with the Civic Centre and Civic Hall demolished to make way for a new entirely publicly owned complex without any residential development. 50 per cent of the space "will house public meeting rooms, offices, childcare facilities, commercial and retail facilities, a plaza and open space, on-site parking and Council chambers." Community consultation of the project found 85% of respondents supported the project, and the $110 million project was tendered to Taylor Construction Group in January 2020, despite some opposition on the basis that the project was too expensive compared to the cost of refurbishing the existing Civic Centre and that the Civic Centre should be heritage listed.

== See also ==
- List of town halls in Sydney
- Architecture of Sydney
