= Christopher Gordon (composer) =

Australian composer

Deputy Mayor of Ryde
- In office 26 September 2017 – 11 September 2018
- Mayor: Jerome Laxale
- Preceded by: Jane Stott
- Succeeded by: Simon Zhou

Councillor of the City of Ryde for East Ward
- In office 9 September 2017 – 4 December 2021

Personal details
- Born: 1956 (age 69–70) England, United Kingdom
- Party: New South Wales Greens (since 2017)
- Other political affiliations: Arts Party (2016)
- Occupation: Composer

Christopher John Gordon (born 1956) is an English-born Australian composer and politician best known for his film scores, but has also received major classical commissions. His film scores include, Ladies in Black (2018), Mao's Last Dancer (2009), Master and Commander: The Far Side of the World (2003) and On the Beach (2000).

== Political career ==
In 2016, Gordon ran for the Arts Party in the City of Ryde based seat of Bennelong, achieving 1.08% of the vote.

In 2017, he was elected as councillor on the East Ward of the City of Ryde for the Greens and was chosen as deputy mayor, serving a single term in 2017–2018. Gordon sought re-election for a second term on Council on 4 December 2021, but was unsuccessful.

== Awards and nominations ==
Gordon has won national awards for composition, both in Australia and overseas.

Year	Nominee / work	Award	Result
1998	Moby Dick (Christopher Gordon)	APRA Awards: Best Television Theme	Won
2000	On the Beach (Gordon)	Australian Screen Music Awards: Best Music for a Mini-Series or Telemovie	Won
2000	On the Beach (Gordon)	Australian Screen Music Awards: Best Original Title Theme for a Series, Serial or Mini-Series	Won
2000	On the Beach (Gordon)	Australian Screen Music Awards: Best Soundtrack Album	Won
2001	When Good Ghouls Go Bad (Gordon)	Australian Screen Music Awards: Best Music for a Mini-Series or Telemovie	Won
2004	Master and Commander: The Far Side of the World (Gordon, Iva Davies, Richard Tognetti	ASCAP Awards: Top Box Office Films	Won
2005	Salem's Lot (Gordon, Lisa Gerrard)	Primetime Emmy Nomination: Outstanding Music Composition for a Miniseries, Movie or a Special (Dramatic Underscore)	Nominated
2009	Mao's Last Dancer (Gordon)	AFI Awards: Best Music Score	Won
2010	Mao's Last Dancer (Gordon)	ARIA Award for Best Original Soundtrack, Cast or Show Album	Nominated
2018	Ladies in Black (Gordon)	AACTA Awards: Best Original Score	Won
2021	June Again (Gordon)	AACTA Awards: Best Original Score	Won

== Film scores ==
- June Again (2020)
- Ladies in Black (2018)
- Adore (2013)
- Crawl (2011)
- Mao's Last Dancer (2009)
- Daybreakers (2009)
- Master and Commander: The Far Side of the World (2003)
- On the Beach (2000)
- Sydney – A Story of a City (2000)
- Moby Dick (1998)
