= Jerome Laxale =

Australian politician

Jerome Laxale MP
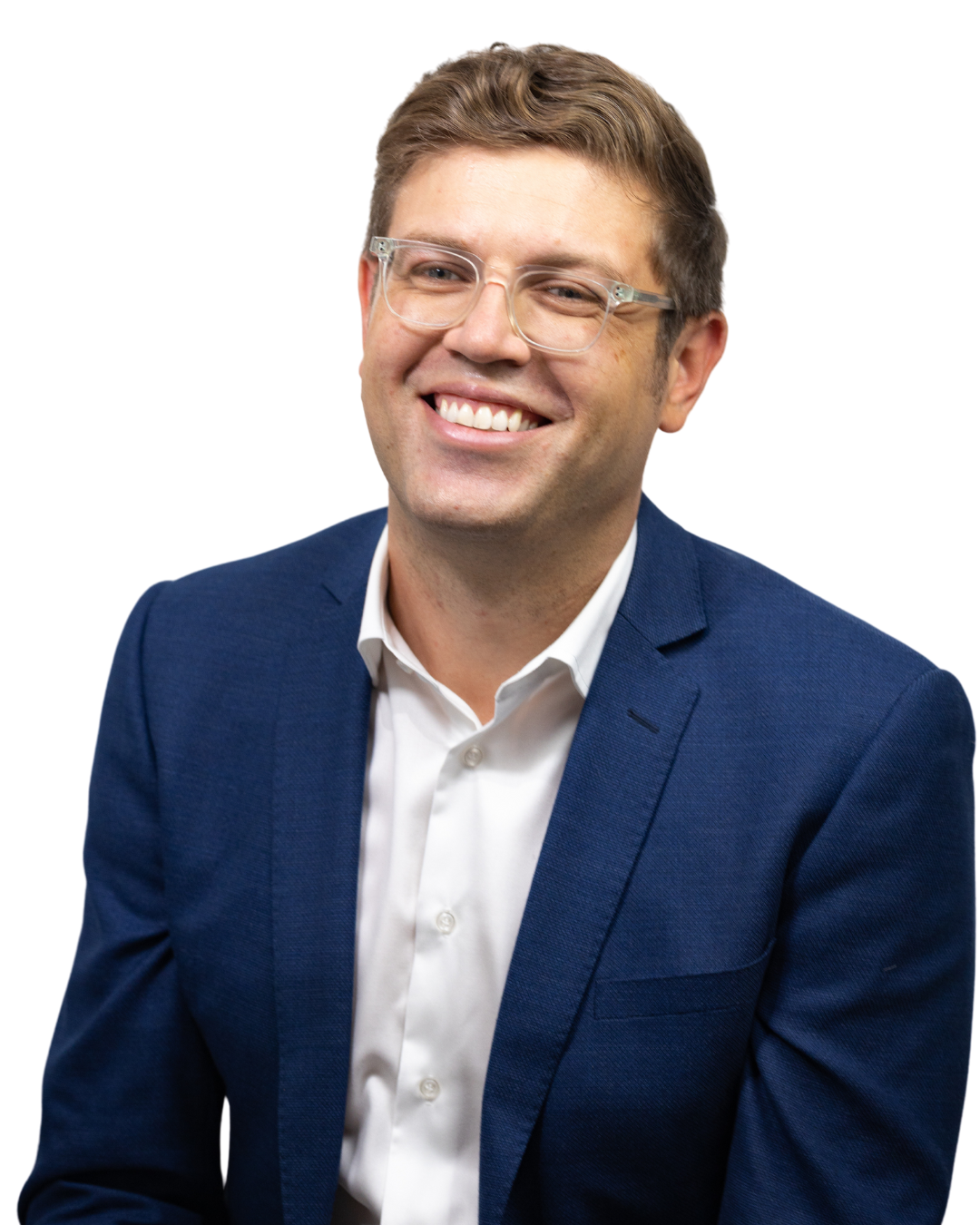
- Official portrait, 2022

Member of the Australian Parliament for Bennelong
- Incumbent
- Assumed office 21 May 2022
- Preceded by: John Alexander

55th Mayor of Ryde
- In office 26 September 2017 – 11 January 2022
- Deputy: Christopher Gordon; Simon Zhou; Peter Kim; Roy Maggio
- Preceded by: Bill Pickering
- Succeeded by: Jordan Lane
- In office 8 September 2015 – 16 September 2016
- Deputy: Roy Maggio
- Preceded by: Bill Pickering
- Succeeded by: Bill Pickering

Councillor of the City of Ryde for West Ward
- In office 8 September 2012 – 22 July 2022
- Succeeded by: Justin Li

Personal details
- Born: 20 November 1983 (age 43) Westmead, New South Wales, Australia
- Citizenship: Australia; France (until 2022); Mauritius (until 2022)
- Party: Labor
- Domestic partner: Jo Taranto
- Children: 3
- Education: University of New South Wales
- Website: Official website

Jerome Alexandre Alain Laxale (born 20 November 1983) is an Australian politician who has served as the member of parliament (MP) for the New South Wales division of Bennelong since 2022.

Laxale previously served as a councillor of the City of Ryde from 2012 to 2022, and served as the city's mayor from 2015 to 2016 and from 2017 to 2022.

== Early life and career ==
Jerome Alexandre Alain Laxale was born on 20 November 1983 in Westmead, New South Wales to a Mauritian father from Mauritius and a Réunionese mother. His father was a member of the Mauritian Militant Movement (MMM). Laxale was educated at The King's School. He then attended University of New South Wales and majored in Politics and International Relations and the French language. After graduating, he joined his family's business, supplying hair and beauty products as a small business director.

Laxale served as a non-executive director at specialised worker's compensation insurer Statecover Mutual Limited from 2018 until his election to federal politics. During that time, he also served as Chair of the Risk committee. Laxale also served as associate director of Local Government Procurement, Director of Local Government NSW and as an Advisory Board Member for Venture Cafe Sydney.

== Political career ==
Laxale joined the Labor Party in 2004 and has been the Eastwood Labor branch president since 2008.

=== Councillor of Ryde (2012–2022) ===
Laxale was first elected to the City of Ryde for the West Ward at the 2012 local government elections.

Laxale became mayor of the council on 8 September 2015, and was at the time the youngest ever in this role at the age of 31. At the end of the one-year term on 16 September 2016, Laxale was replaced as Mayor by Liberal Councillor Bill Pickering by a 7–5 vote of the council.

After the local government elections in September 2017, on 26 September 2017, the newly elected Council elected Laxale to be the Mayor again for a two-year term. He was re-elected in September 2019 and in September 2021, serving as mayor until January 2022, when he was succeeded by Liberal's Jordan Lane.

In addition to his duties as a Councillor in the City of Ryde, Laxale was also the Treasurer in the Local Government NSW (LGNSW) Board, a position he was elected to in October 2019.

In 2017, Laxale served for one term as Vice President of the Northern Sydney Regional Organisation of Councils.

From 2015 to 2017, Laxale served as Chairperson of the Parramatta River Catchment Group, contributing to its 10-year master plan to make the Parramatta River swimmable.

As the Mayor of Ryde, Laxale led Council to transition to 100% renewable energy, install electric vehicle chargers, divest in fossil fuel aligned institutions, set a Zero Litter to River target and declare a climate emergency. In 2020, Laxale was a finalist at the Cities Power Partnership awards for the Climate Ambassador (elected representative) category.

Laxale resigned as Councillor on 22 July 2022 after he was elected to federal parliament. Laxale also left the LGNSW board and his position as LGNSW Treasurer.

==== Attempts to enter state politics ====
Laxale contested the state seat of Ryde as the Labor candidate in the 2011, 2015 and 2019 state elections but lost to incumbent Liberal Party member Victor Dominello in all three occasions. However, his primary vote and two-party-preferred vote (TPP) had increased in each election, starting with 17.0% primary vote and 24.3% TPP in 2011, increasing to 30.4% primary vote and 41% of the TPP in 2019.

=== House of Representatives (2022–present) ===
Laxale became the Labor Party candidate for the Division of Bennelong in the 2022 federal election. In order to stand for election, he renounced his French and Mauritian citizenship which he inherited from his mother and father respectively. He defeated the incumbent Liberal Party with a swing of 7.9 percent, just over the 6.9 percent swing needed to win. He is the second Labor candidate to win the former Liberal stronghold since its creation in 1949.

Laxale is the Chair of the Friends of France and Friends of Armenia, inter-parliamentary friendship groups, and also serves as co-chair of the Parliamentary Friends of Tech and Innovation.

In December 2023, Laxale and other Labor MPs urged Treasurer Jim Chalmers to take stronger action against the cost of living crisis. This led to the Government announcing more energy bill relief and the changes to the stage three tax cuts.

In 2024, Jerome was made the Federal NSW Patron of the Labor Environment Action Network, recognising his long-held views on taking climate action.

In February 2025, Laxale led a campaign alongside fellow Labor member Sally Sitou to convince the government and the crossbench to pass the stalled Nature Positive Bill to establish a federal environmental protection agency. Though the legislation did not pass during the 47th parliament, Laxale and other members secured a commitment from the re-elected Albanese government for environmental law reform and the establishment of an environmental protection agency.

Laxale stood in the 2025 Australian federal election for a second term. The redistribution of the adjacent division of North Sydney erased his majority and made Bennelong a notionally Liberal seat, but Laxale was re-elected with a sizable swing of 9.5 percent against Liberal candidate Scott Yung, just short of making Bennelong a safe Labor seat. Laxale also became the first Labor member to win the seat of Bennelong in consecutive elections.

During the 48th Parliament, Laxale was appointed as Chair of the Joint Standing Committee on Electoral Matters, the Parliamentary Joint Committee on Intelligence and Security, and re-appointed to the House Standing Committee on Economics. As chair of the Joint Standing Committee on Electoral Matters, Laxale launched the inquiry into the 2025 election with a particular focus on safety, security and voter experience issues emanating from the 2025 federal election. In June 2025, following Laxale's re-election, Laxale called on the Government to ensure a link between reformed environmental laws and emissions reduction targets.

Laxale serves on the House Economics Committee, the Joint Standing Committee on Trade and Investment Growth, the Joint Statutory Committee on Broadcasting of Parliamentary Proceedings and the Joint Statutory Committee on the National Anti-Corruption Commission. During his time on these committees, Laxale has spent public hearings calling for the Reserve Bank of Australia to focus more on renters, and for banks to do more on scams and to implement fee-free digital payments.

== Political positions ==
Since entering federal politics, Laxale has been a vocal advocate for stronger environmental protections. He has been critical of the Albanese government's gas strategy, and has urged for a shift away from new gas investments. He has pushed for a greater focus on renewable energy and emissions reduction, arguing that continued gas expansion undermines Australia's climate commitments. His stance aligns with concerns raised by environmental groups and members of the Labor Party who see the gas strategy as inconsistent with net-zero goals.

In June 2023, Laxale called for the banning of single-use disposable coffee cups in Parliament House.

Laxale is an advocate for abolishing credit and debit card surcharge fees.

Laxale is a member of the Labor Left faction.

== Personal life ==
Laxale has a son and twin daughters from a previous marriage. His current partner is Jo Taranto.

Laxale has lived in the City of Ryde and the electorate of Bennelong since 2006. He lives in North Ryde.

Laxale is fluent in French. In his first speech to Parliament, he included French and Mauritian Creole phrases.

Parliament of Australia
Preceded by John Alexander	Member for Bennelong; 2022–present	Incumbent
Civic offices
Preceded by Bill Pickering	Mayor of Ryde; 2015–2016	Succeeded by Bill Pickering
Preceded by Bill Pickering	Mayor of Ryde; 2017–2022	Succeeded by Jordan Lane
