= Jordan Lane (politician) =

Australian politician

Jordan Lane MP
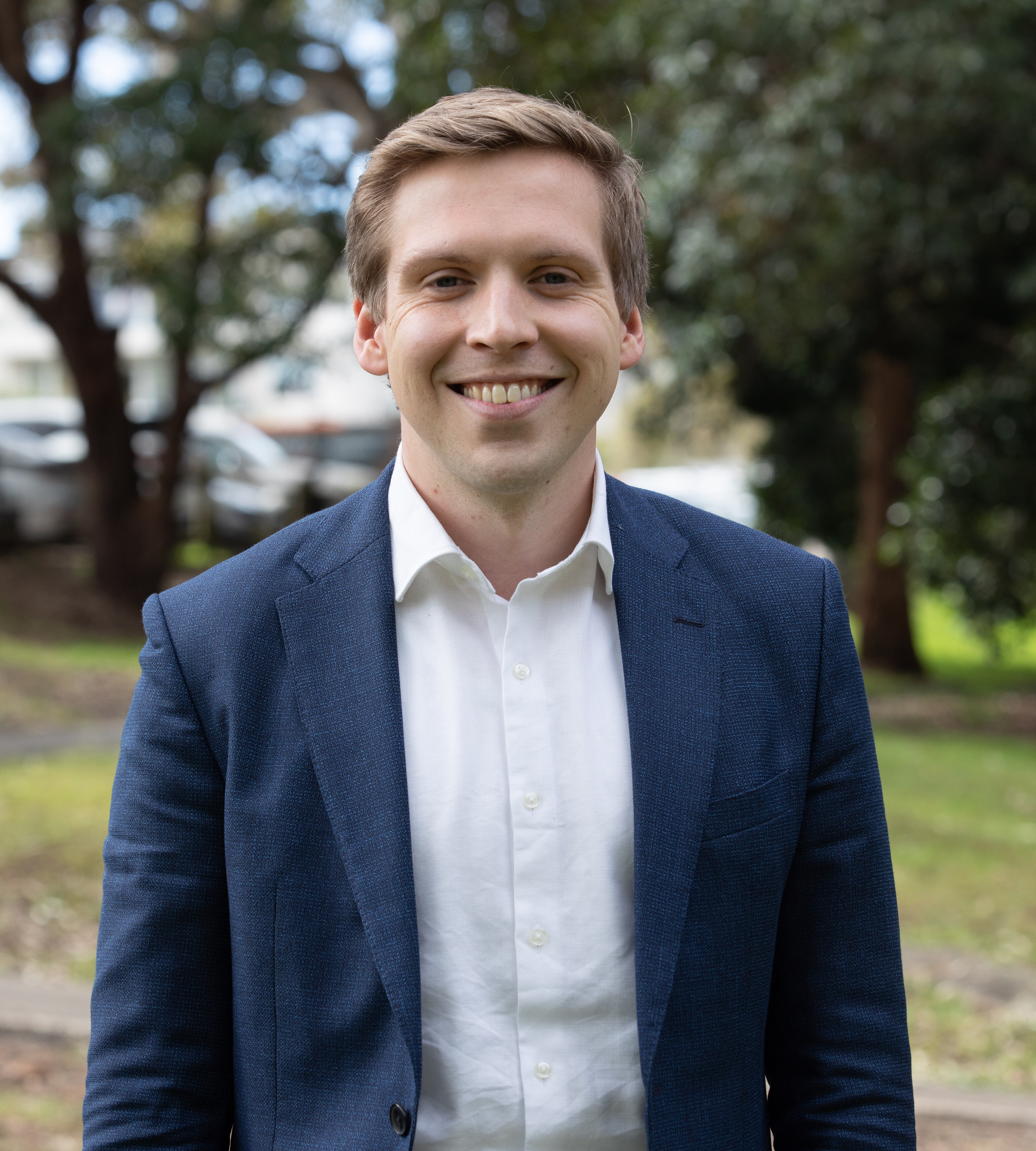
- Lane in 2023

Member of the New South Wales Assembly for Ryde
- Incumbent
- Assumed office 25 March 2023
- Preceded by: Victor Dominello

56th Mayor of the City of Ryde
- In office 11 January 2022 – 13 December 2022
- Deputy: Sarkis Yedelian
- Preceded by: Jerome Laxale
- Succeeded by: Sarkis Yedelian

Councillor of City of Ryde for East Ward
- In office 9 September 2017 – 2 October 2024

Personal details
- Born: 23 July 1994 (age 32) Ryde, New South Wales, Australia
- Party: Liberal
- Education: Marist College Eastwood
- Alma mater: University of Sydney
- Occupation: Project manager, disability advocate, councillor

Jordan Rae Tyler Lane (born 23 July 1994) is an Australian politician. He was elected a member of the New South Wales Legislative Assembly representing Ryde for the Liberal Party in 2023.

== Early life ==
Lane was born at Denistone House in Ryde Hospital. He grew up in the suburb of Melrose Park.

Lane attended two primary schools: Meadowbank Public School and later Ermington Public School. He attended high school at Marist College Eastwood, and was elected school captain in year 12.

== Local government career ==
He was first elected to Ryde council for East Ward in 2017, as a member of the Liberal Party. Lane went on to serve as mayor of Ryde from January 2022 to December 2022 before he was selected as the Liberal candidate for the state seat of Ryde at the 2023 New South Wales state election.

== State political career ==
Lane was declared the winner of the final outstanding seat of the election, two weeks after election day. He was victorious over Labor's Lyndal Howison by 50 votes. Due to the closeness of the result, a recount was held which increased his margin to 54 votes. Lane announced his retirement from Parliament on 6 November 2026 ahead of an election in March 2027.

New South Wales Legislative Assembly
Preceded by Victor Dominello	Member for Ryde; 2023–present	Incumbent
Civic offices
Preceded by Jerome Laxale	Mayor of Ryde; 2022	Succeeded by Sarkis Yedelian
