= List of mayors of Ryde =

Mayor of the City of Ryde
- Incumbent; Trenton Brown since 19 March 2024
- Style: His/Her Worship the Mayor Councillor
- Appointer: Council of the City of Ryde
- Term length: One Year (1870–1959) Three years (1959–1968) One Year (1968–2017) Two years (2017–date)
- Formation: 13 February 1871
- First holder: Edward Terry
- Deputy: Shweta Deshpande
- Salary: $40,740–92,180 (2022)
- Website: City of Ryde website

The Mayor of Ryde is the elected head of the City of Ryde, a local government area in the north shore region of Sydney, New South Wales, Australia. The council was first incorporated on 11 November 1870. Since 2017, the mayor is elected for a two-year term, by the councillors. The mayor is assisted in their work by a Deputy Mayor, who is elected on an annual basis by the elected councillors.

== Election method ==
From 1870 to 1959, the mayor was elected annually by the elected aldermen. From 1959 to 1968, the Municipality of Ryde had a system of triennial mayoral elections, with the mayor chosen by the electors of the municipality alongside the elected aldermen. From 1968 to 2017, the mayor was again elected annually by the aldermen (retitled councillors after 1 July 1993, with the enactment of the Local Government Act, 1993). From 2017, in line with all other local government areas in the state, the mayoral term was extended to two years.

A referendum was undertaken at the election held on 4 December 2021, asking residents the following question: "Do you support a popularly elected Mayor where the voters of the City of Ryde elect the Mayor for a four (4) year term, thereby adopting a thirteen (13) Councillor model (including the Mayor)?". The final declared results were: 76.18% YES and 23.82% NO. As a result, the position of mayor will again be directly elected from the next local government elections scheduled for 2024.

== Mayors ==
The following individuals have served as Mayor of the City of Ryde and its predecessors:

#	Mayor	Party	Term	Notes
1	Edward Terry	Independent	13 February 1871 – 11 February 1874	
2	Gerrard Herring	Independent	11 February 1874 – October 1875	
–	Edward Terry	Independent	22 October 1875 – 12 February 1876	
–	Gerrard Herring	Independent	12 February 1876 – 13 October 1876	
3	George Wicks	Independent	13 October 1876 – 12 February 1877	
4	John Linsley	Independent	12 February 1877 – 9 February 1880	
–	Gerard Edgar Herring	Independent	9 February 1880 – 20 February 1885	
5	James Ross	Independent	20 February 1885 – 1 March 1886	
6	Henry Watts	Independent	1 March 1886 – 14 February 1887	
7	William Jackson	Independent	14 February 1887 – 4 November 1887	
–	James Ross	Independent	4 November 1887 – 13 February 1889	
8	George Lovell	Independent	13 February 1889 – 16 February 1891	
9	Samuel Jordan	Independent	16 February 1891 – 12 February 1892	
10	John Forsyth	Independent	12 February 1892 – 18 February 1893	
11	Thomas Potts	Independent	18 February 1893 – 14 February 1894	
–	Samuel Jordan	Independent	14 February 1894 – 14 February 1896	
12	Thomas Pidding	Independent	14 February 1896 – 11 February 1897	
13	Edward Worthington	Independent	11 February 1897 – 13 February 1898	
–	Edward Terry	Independent	13 February 1898 – 22 September 1899	
14	Walter Hibble	Independent	27 September 1899 – 13 February 1901	
15	John Redshaw	Independent	13 February 1901 – 14 February 1902	
16	Edward Betts	Independent	14 February 1902 – 6 February 1904	
17	David Anderson	Independent	6 February 1904 – 14 February 1905	
18	William Thompson	Independent	14 February 1905 – 13 February 1906	
19	Rowland Sutton	Independent	13 February 1906 – 15 February 1907	
20	Sidney Benson	Independent	15 February 1907 – 7 February 1908	
–	David Anderson	Independent	7 February 1908 – 11 February 1909	
–	John Redshaw	Independent	11 February 1909 – February 1911	
21	Charles Robert Summerhayes	Independent	February 1911 – 12 February 1913	
–	David Anderson	Independent	12 February 1913 – February 1914	
–	Rowland Sutton	Independent	February 1914 – 12 February 1915	
22	John Kelly	Independent	12 February 1915 – 5 February 1920	
23	Alexander Stewart	Independent	5 February 1920 – December 1920	
24	Charles Dyer	Independent	December 1920 – December 1921	
–	Charles Robert Summerhayes	Independent	December 1921 – December 1922	
–	Charles Dyer	Independent	December 1922 – 14 December 1927	
25	Albion Greenwood	Independent	14 December 1927 – December 1931	
26	Percival Chatfield	Independent	December 1931 – 5 December 1934	
27	William Harrison	Independent	5 December 1934 – December 1936	
28	William Mahon	Independent	December 1936 – December 1937	
–	William Harrison	Independent	December 1937 – December 1938	
29	William Irvine	Independent	December 1938 – December 1939	
–	William Harrison	Independent	December 1939 – 24 June 1942	
30	Gibson McMillan	Independent	30 June 1942 – December 1943	
31	Clive Bondfield	Independent	December 1943 – December 1947	
32	E. L. S. Hall	Independent	December 1947 – 17 December 1948	
33	Kenneth Anderson	Independent	17 December 1948 – December 1950	
34	Henry Attwool Dunbar Mitchell	Independent	December 1950 – December 1953	
35	William John Irvine	Independent	December 1953 – December 1956	
–	Henry Attwool Dunbar Mitchell MBE	Independent	December 1956 – December 1957	
36	James Henry Donovan	Independent	December 1957 – December 1958	
–	William Harrison	Independent	December 1958 – 5 December 1959	
37	E. L. S. Hall	Independent	5 December 1959 – 1 December 1962	
38	C. M. Cutler	Independent	1 December 1962 – December 1968	
–	William Harrison	Independent	December 1968 – 18 September 1971	
39	Harry Anderson	Independent	18 September 1971 – September 1973	
40	Mick Lardelli	Independent	September 1973 – September 1974	
41	T. Greenwood	Independent	September 1974 – September 1977	
–	Harry Anderson	Independent	September 1977 – September 1979	
42	Ross Horner	Independent	September 1979 – September 1980	
43	Edna Wilde	Independent	September 1980 – September 1982	
44	J. M. Malone	Independent	September 1982 – September 1983	
45	Mick Lardelli AM	Independent	September 1983 – September 1995	
46	Jim Hull	Independent	September 1995 – September 1997	
47	Peter Graham OAM	Independent	September 1997 – September 1999	
–	Edna Wilde OAM	Independent	September 1999 – September 2000	
48	Ivan Petch	Independent	September 2000 – 10 September 2002	
–	Edna Wilde OAM	Independent	10 September 2002 – 8 April 2004	
49	Terry Perram	Independent	8 April 2004 – 13 September 2005	
–	Ivan Petch	Independent	13 September 2005 – 30 September 2008	
50	Vic Tagg	Independent	30 September 2008 – 8 September 2009	
51	Michael Butterworth	Labor	8 September 2009 – 14 September 2010	
52	Artin Etmekdjian	Liberal	14 September 2010 – 25 September 2012	
–	Ivan Petch	Independent	25 September 2012 – 9 September 2013	
53	Roy Maggio	Liberal	9 September 2013 – 9 September 2014	
54	Bill Pickering	Liberal	9 September 2014 – 8 September 2015	
55	Jerome Laxale	Labor	8 September 2015 – 16 September 2016	
–	Bill Pickering	Liberal	16 September 2016 – 9 September 2017	
–	Jerome Laxale	Labor	26 September 2017 – 11 January 2022	
56	Jordan Lane	Liberal	11 January 2022 – 13 December 2022	
57	Sarkis Yedelian OAM	Liberal	13 December 2022 – 19 March 2024	
58	Trenton Brown	Liberal	19 March 2024 – present	

== Election results ==
=== 2024 ===
2024 New South Wales mayoral elections: Ryde
Party	Candidate	Votes	%	±%
Liberal	Trenton Brown	27,324	41.03	+41.03
Labor	Bernard Purcell	16,422	24.66	+24.66
Roy Maggio Independents	Roy Maggio	14,694	22.07	+22.07
Greens	Tina Kordrostami	8,152	12.24	+12.24
Total formal votes		66,592	96.31	
Informal votes		2,550	3.69	
Turnout		69,142	86.17	
Two-candidate-preferred result
Liberal	Trenton Brown	30,248	56.51	+56.51
Labor	Bernard Purcell	23,276	43.49	+43.49
Liberal hold		Swing	N/A	

- This was the first time the position of mayor of Ryde was directly elected instead of appointed by councillors
- Trenton Brown (Liberal) was the incumbent mayor going into the elections, having been appointed on 28 March 2024

== See also ==
- Local government areas of New South Wales
