= Charles Robert Summerhayes =

Australian politician

21st Mayor of Ryde
- In office February 1911 – 12 February 1913
- Preceded by: John Redshaw
- Succeeded by: David Anderson
- In office December 1921 – December 1922
- Preceded by: Charles Dyer
- Succeeded by: Charles Dyer

Alderman on the Ryde Municipal Council
- In office 14 February 1905 – December 1923
- Constituency: West Ward

Personal details
- Born: 1 September 1860 Mudgee, Colony of New South Wales
- Died: 2 October 1948 (aged 88) Eastwood, New South Wales, Australia
- Occupation: Architect

Charles Robert Summerhayes (1 September 1860 – 2 October 1948) was an Australian architect, builder and politician, who served on the Ryde Municipal Council, including several terms as mayor.

== Biography ==
Summerhayes was first elected as an alderman for the West Ward on the Ryde Municipal Council in February 1905.

Summerhayes died age 88 at his long-time residence, "Womerah" in Eastwood, survived by his seven children.

== Key works ==
- Terrace Group, 16–34 Gibbes Street, Newtown, New South Wales (1896)
- Bombara, Stanmore Road, Stanmore, New South Wales (1897)
- Holy Trinity Greek Orthodox Church, Surry Hills, New South Wales (1898; altered 1931)
- Womerah, Trelawney Street, Eastwood, New South Wales (1905)
- St Philip's Anglican Church, Eastwood, New South Wales (1907)
- Summerhayes Shops Group, Rowe Street, Eastwood, New South Wales (c. 1920)
- Duke of York Theatre (Odeon Eastwood), Rowe Street, Eastwood, New South Wales (1927; demolished 1973).
- Eastwood Park Grandstand, Eastwood, New South Wales (1933)
- Ryde Park Rotunda, Ryde Park, Ryde, New South Wales (1934)
- Elston Court, Wollstonecraft, New South Wales (1934)
- Franklyn Court, Wollstonecraft, New South Wales (1934)
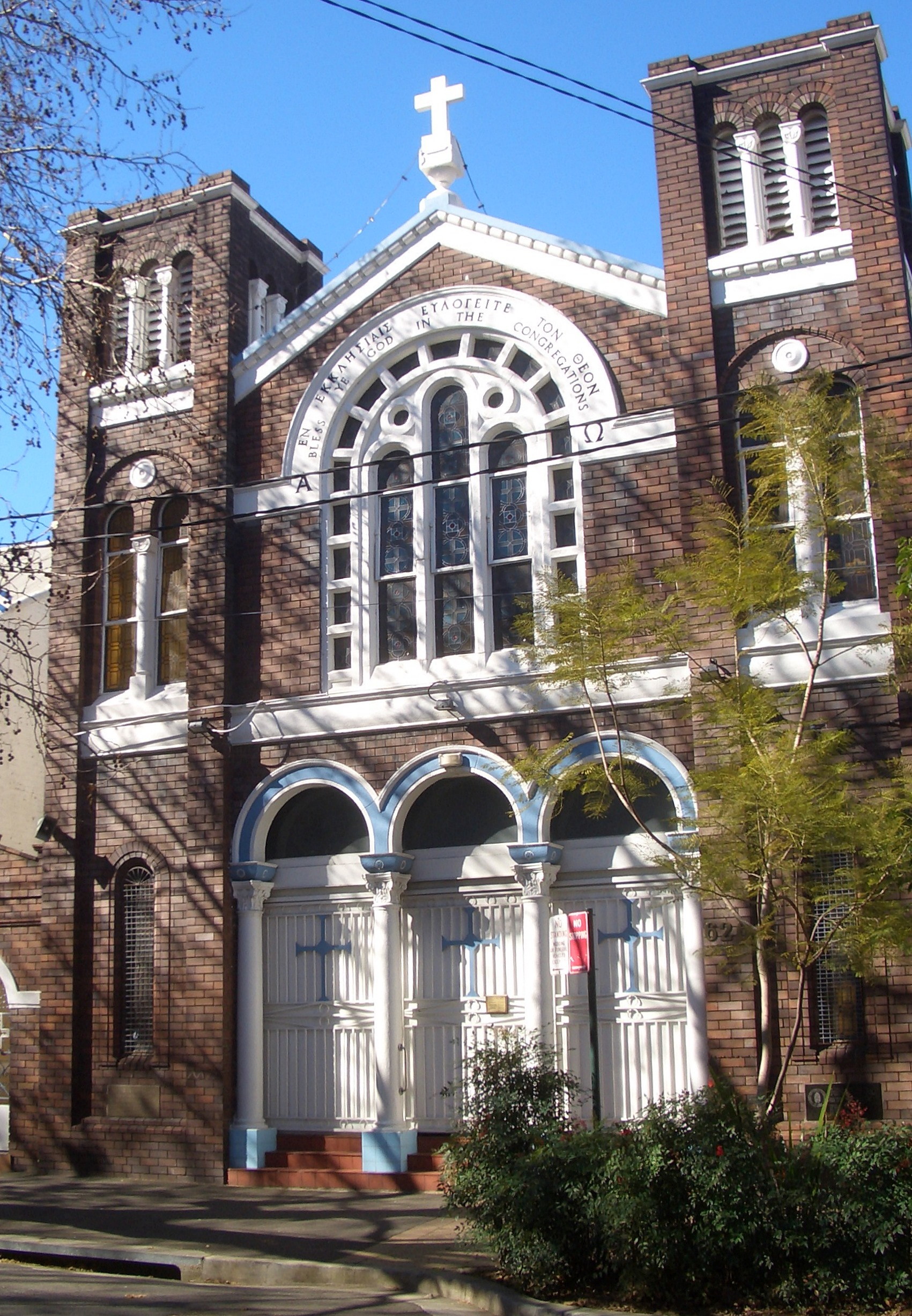
Holy Trinity Greek Orthodox Church, Surry Hills
(altered 1931 facade)

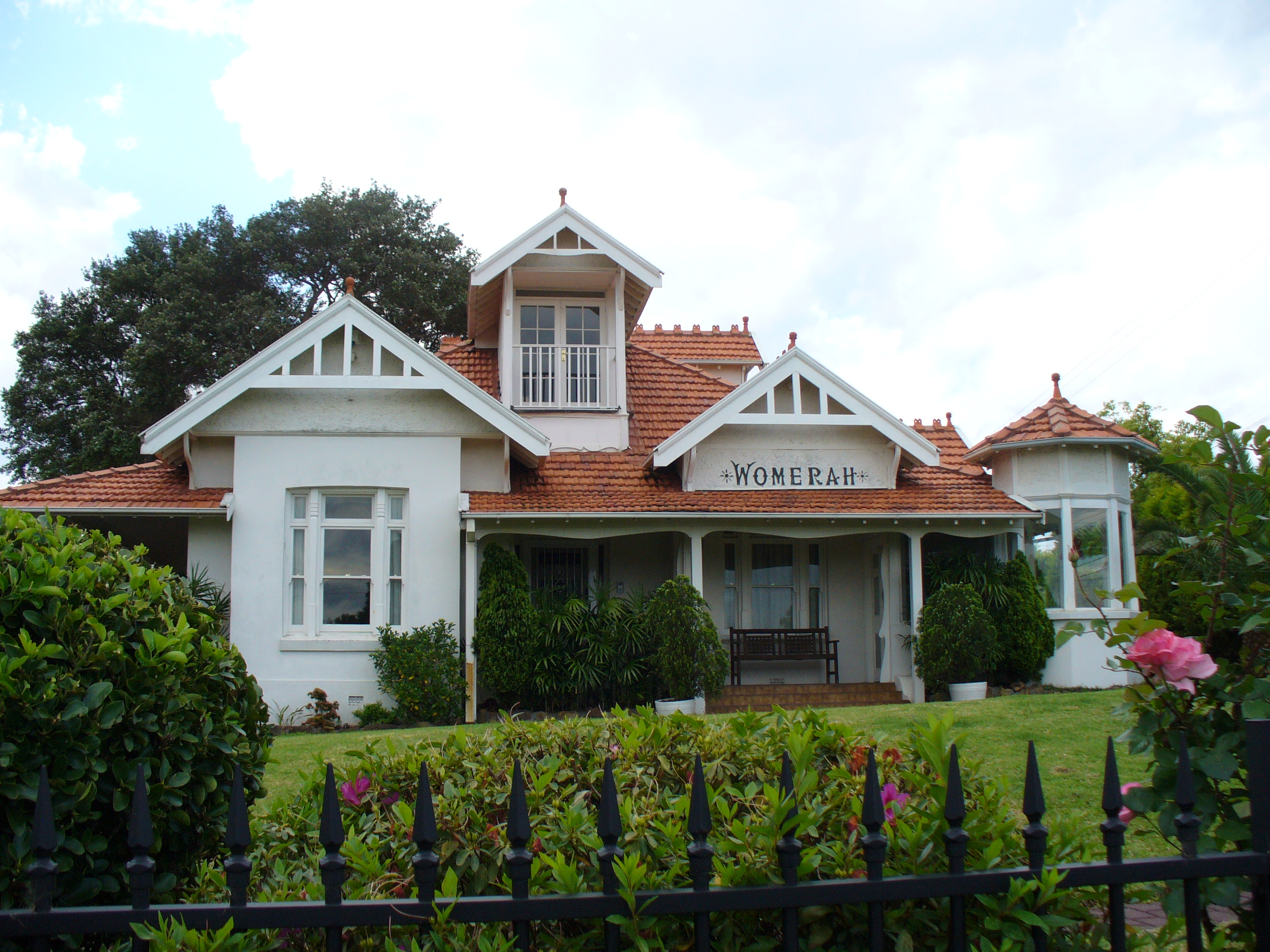
"Womerah", Eastwood

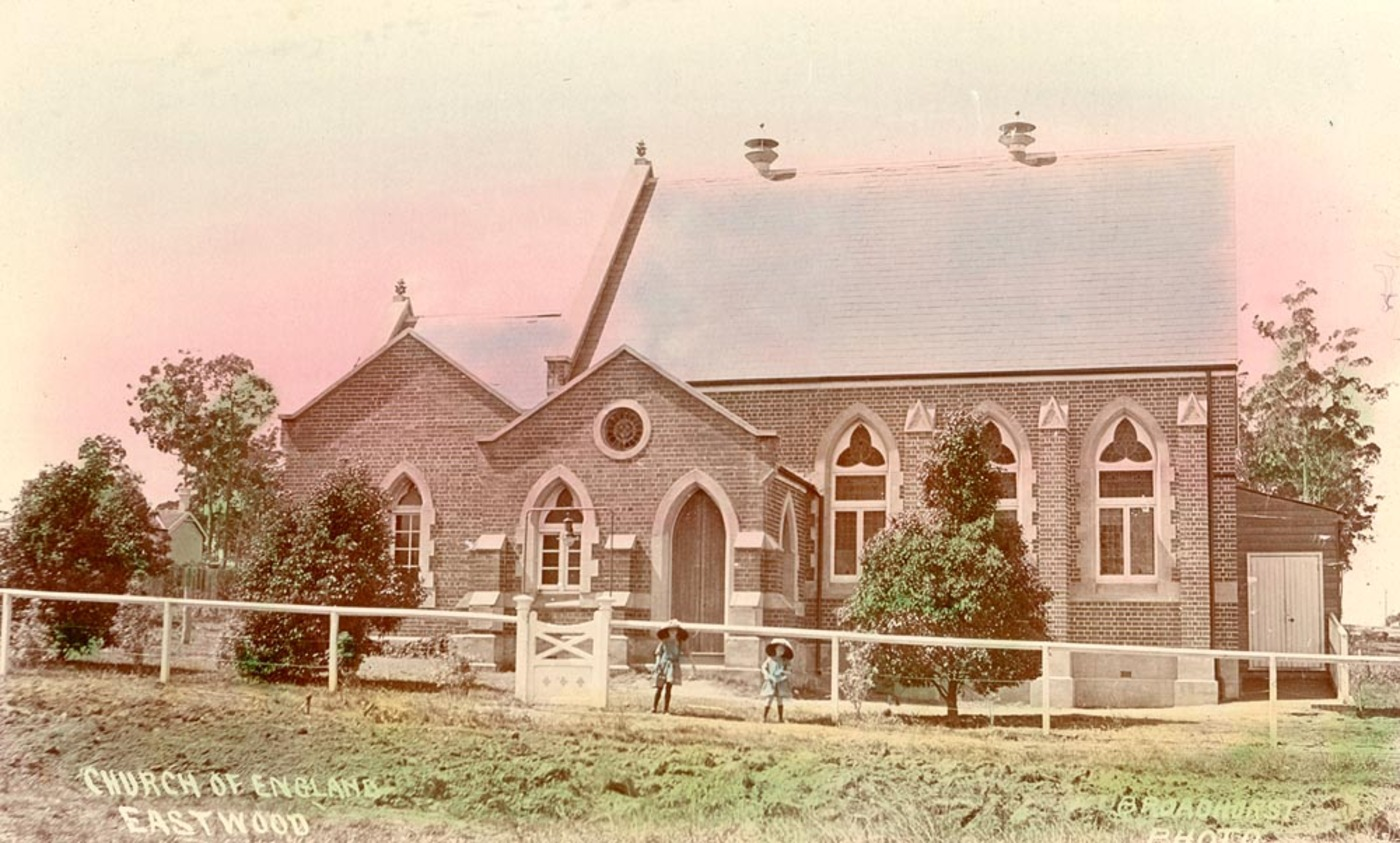
St Philip's Anglican Church, Eastwood

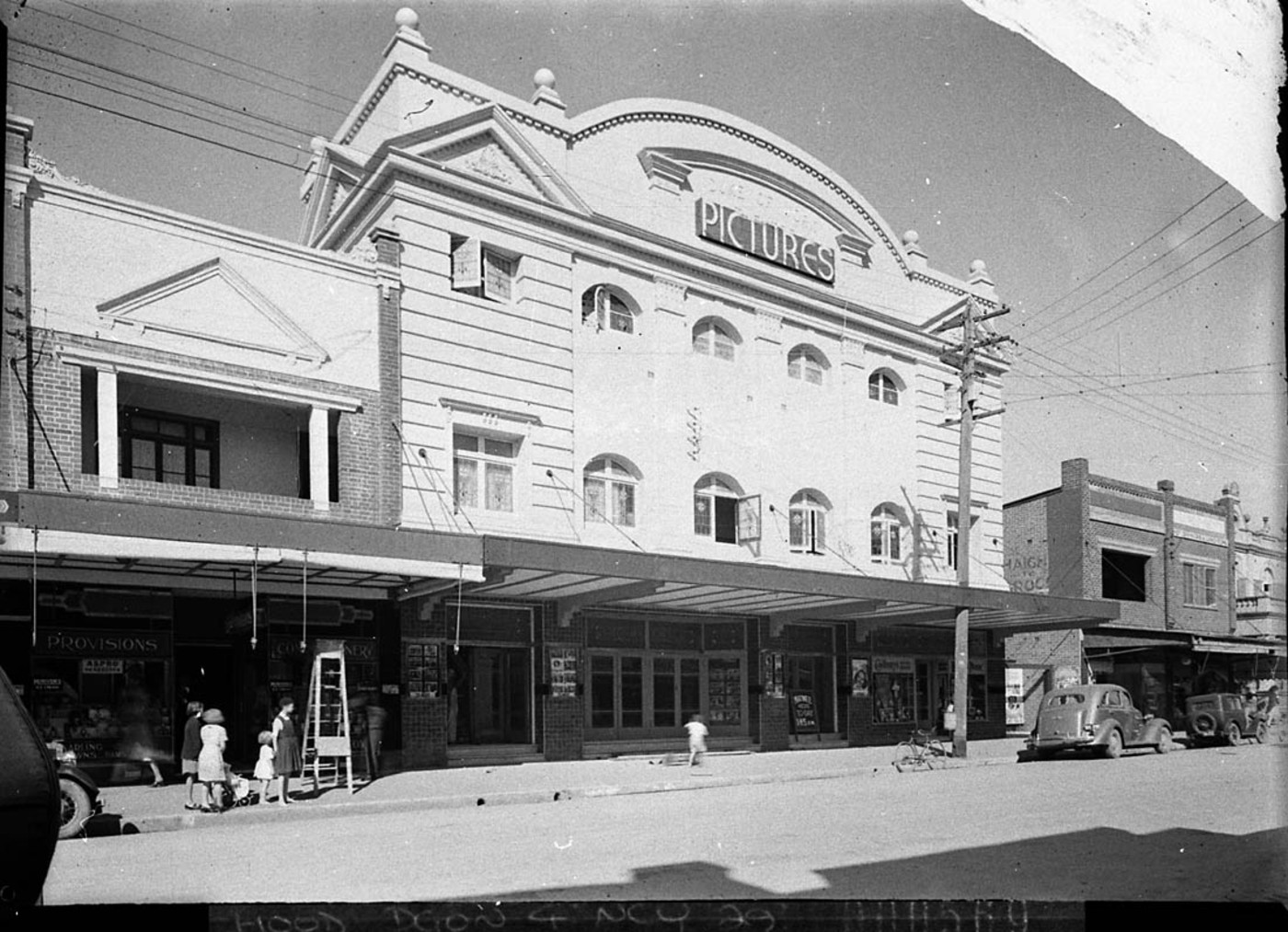
Duke of York Theatre, Eastwood
(demolished 1973)

Civic offices
Preceded by John Redshaw	Mayor of Ryde; 1911 – 1913	Succeeded by David Anderson
Preceded by Charles Dyer	Mayor of Ryde; 1921 – 1922	Succeeded by Charles Dyer
