= Target ridings in the 2006 Canadian federal election =

The 39th Canadian federal election was held on January 23, 2006.

The target ridings are the ridings that were won by a narrow margin in the preceding election, making them promising campaign targets in the election in question. Below is the list target ridings for the 2006 federal election that were narrowly lost by each major party in the 2004 election, with indications whether they were won or lost by the incumbent in the 2006 election.

Up to 30 are shown, with a maximum margin of victory of 15%. For example, under the Liberal column are the 30 seats in which they came closest to winning in 2004 but did not. Listed is the name of the riding, followed by the party which was victorious in 2004 (in parentheses) and the margin, in terms of percentage of the vote, between the winning candidate and the runner-up. Finally, the 2006 election winners are listed in italics. Bold ridings indicate successful gains.

To clarify further; this is a list of 2004 federal election winners with their party in parentheses, and their margin of victory as a percentage of the vote.

* Indicates incumbent did not seek re-election.

Liberal Party	Conservative Party
1. Simcoe—Grey, ON (Cons) 0.18% → Cons; 2. Regina—Lumsden—Lake Centre, SK (Cons) 0.39% → Cons; 3. Cambridge, ON (Cons) 0.43% → Cons; 4. Kildonan—St. Paul, MB (Cons) 0.77% → Cons; 5. Burnaby—New Westminster, BC (NDP) 0.79% → NDP; 6. Saskatoon—Humboldt, SK (Cons) 1.23% → Cons; 7. Newton—North Delta, BC (Cons) 1.26%* → Lib; 8. Niagara West—Glanbrook, ON (Cons) 1.28% → Cons; 9. Newmarket—Aurora, ON (Lib) 1.34% (Cons. MP Belinda Stronach later joined the Libs.) → Lib; 10. Essex, ON (Cons) 1.61% → Cons; 11. Charleswood—St. James—Assiniboia, MB (Cons) 1.74% → Cons; 12. Sault Ste. Marie, ON (NDP) 1.75% → NDP; 13. Timmins-James Bay, ON (NDP) 1.80% → NDP; 14. Chicoutimi—Le Fjord, QC (BQ) 1.89% → BQ; 15. Abitibi—Baie-James—Nunavik—Eeyou, QC (BQ) 2.057% → BQ; 16. Burnaby—Douglas, BC (NDP) 2.060% → NDP; 17. Niagara Falls, ON (Cons) 2.21% → Cons; 18. Halifax, NS (NDP) 2.43% → NDP; 19. Durham, ON (Cons) 2.48% → Cons; 20. Oshawa, ON (Cons) 2.74% → Cons; 21. West Vancouver—Sunshine Coast—Sea to Sky Country, BC (Cons) 2.78%* → Lib; 22. Haldimand—Norfolk, ON (Cons) 3.30% → Cons; 23. Dufferin—Caledon, ON (Cons) 3.80% → Cons; 24. St. John's South—Mount Pearl, NL (Cons) 4.31% → Cons; 25. Wellington—Halton Hills, ON (Cons) 4.59% → Cons; 26. St. John's East, NL (Cons) 4.75% → Cons; 27. Prince Edward—Hastings, ON (Cons) 4.79% → Cons; 28. Toronto—Danforth, ON (NDP) 5.00% → NDP; 29. Churchill (NDP/Ind.) 5.08% → Lib; 30. Vaudreuil—Soulanges, QC (BQ) 5.50% → BQ	1. Edmonton—Mill Woods—Beaumont, AB (Lib/Ind.) 0.3%* → Cons; 2. Lambton—Kent—Middlesex, ON (Lib) 0.3%* → Cons; 3. Northumberland—Quinte West, ON (Lib) 0.6% → Cons; 4. Chatham-Kent—Essex, ON (Lib) 0.9%* → Cons; 5. Edmonton Centre, AB (Lib) 1.4% → Cons; 6. Ottawa West—Nepean, ON (Lib) 2.4%* → Cons; 7. Barrie, ON (Lib) 2.6% → Cons; 8. North Vancouver, BC (Lib) 3.6% → Lib; 9. Ottawa—Orléans, ON (Lib) 4.7% → Cons; 10. Brant, ON (Lib) 5.0% → Lib; 11. Ancaster—Dundas—Flamborough—Westdale, ON (Lib) 5.1% → Cons; 12. Nipissing—Timiskaming, ON (Lib) 5.2% → Lib; 13. Brampton West, ON (Lib) 5.3% → Lib; 14. Burnaby—New Westminster, BC (NDP) 5.4% → NDP; 15. Hamilton Mountain, ON (Lib) 5.5%* → NDP; 16. Simcoe North, ON (Lib) 5.7%* → Cons; 17. St. Catharines, ON (Lib) 5.7% → Cons; 18. Bonavista—Gander—Grand Falls—Windsor, NL (Lib) 6.6% → Lib; 19. Burlington, ON (Lib) 6.7% → Cons; 20. Kitchener—Conestoga, ON (Lib) 6.9% → Cons; 21. Louis-Saint-Laurent, QC (BQ) 7.3% → Cons; 22. Parry Sound-Muskoka, ON (Lib) 7.5% → Cons; 23. Tobique—Mactaquac, NB (Lib) 8.6% → Cons; 24. Whitby—Oshawa, ON (Lib) 9.0% → Cons; 25. Ottawa South, ON (Lib) 9.0% → Lib; 26. Richmond, BC (Lib) 9.2% → Lib; 27. West Nova, NS (Lib) 9.6% → Lib; 28. Saint John, NB (Lib) 9.7% → Lib; 29. Halton, ON (Lib) 10.0% → Cons; 30. Glengarry—Prescott—Russell, ON (Lib) 10.4%* → Cons
Bloc Québécois	New Democratic Party
1. Jeanne-Le Ber, QC (Lib) 0.2% → BQ; 2. Papineau, QC (Lib) 1.1% → BQ; 3. Gatineau, QC (Lib) 1.8% → BQ; 4. Brome—Missisquoi, QC (Lib) 2.4% → BQ; 5. Ahuntsic, QC (Lib) 2.5% → BQ; 6. Brossard—La Prairie, QC (Lib) 4.9% → BQ; 7. Beauce, QC (Lib) 5.1%* → Cons; 8. Honoré-Mercier, QC (Lib) 5.7% → Lib; 9. Outremont, QC (Lib) 7.7% → Lib; 10. Pontiac, QC (Lib) 9.2% → Cons; 11. Hull—Aylmer, QC (Lib) 9.4% → Lib; 12. Laval—Les Îles, QC (Lib) 10.8% → Lib; 13. Bourassa, QC (Lib) 12.2% → Lib	1. Western Arctic, NT (Lib) 0.3% → NDP; 2. New Westminster—Coquitlam, BC (Cons) 0.3% → NDP; 3. Palliser, SK (Cons) 0.4% → Cons; 4. Vancouver Island North, BC (Cons) 0.9% → NDP; 5. Oshawa, ON (Cons) 1.0% → Cons; 6. Saskatoon—Humboldt, SK (Cons) 1.1% → Cons; 7. British Columbia Southern Interior, BC (Cons) 1.5%* → NDP; 8. Trinity—Spadina, ON (Lib) 1.6% → NDP; 9. Hamilton East—Stoney Creek, ON (Lib) 1.9% → NDP; 10. Hamilton Mountain, ON (Lib) 1.9% → NDP; 11. Vancouver Kingsway, BC (Lib) 3.1% → Lib; 12. Regina—Qu'Appelle, SK (Cons) 3.1% → Cons; 13. Newton—North Delta, BC (Cons) 3.6%* → Lib; 14. Victoria, BC (Lib) 3.9%* → NDP; 15. Kenora, ON (Lib) 4.1% → Lib; 16. Esquimalt—Juan de Fuca, BC (Lib) 4.7% → Lib; 17. Pitt Meadows—Maple Ridge—Mission, BC (Cons) 5.8% → Cons; 18. Regina—Lumsden—Lake Centre, SK (Cons) 6.4% → Cons; 19. Nanaimo—Alberni, BC (Cons) 6.8% → Cons; 20. Parkdale—High Park, ON (Lib) 7.6% → NDP; 21. London—Fanshawe, ON (Lib) 7.7%* → NDP; 22. Fleetwood—Port Kells, BC (Cons) 7.8% → Cons; 23. Nickel Belt, ON (Lib) 7.9% → Lib; 24. Vancouver Centre, BC (Lib) 8.0% → Lib; 25. Saskatoon—Rosetown—Biggar, SK (Cons) 8.6% → Cons; 26. Algoma—Manitoulin—Kapuskasing, ON (Lib) 9.2% → Lib; 27. Dartmouth—Cole Harbour, NS (Lib) 9.6% → Lib; 28. Thunder Bay—Rainy River, ON (Lib) 9.7% → Lib; 29. Welland, ON (Lib) 10.1% → Lib; 30. Random—Burin—St. George's, NL (Lib) 13.5% → Lib

== Cabinet ministers who won by less than 5% in 2004 ==
1. Liza Frulla, Canadian Heritage: 0.2% over BQ in Jeanne-Le Ber, QC (defeated in 2006)
2. Ethel Blondin-Andrew, Northern Development: 0.3% over NDP in Western Arctic, NT (defeated in 2006)
3. Pierre Pettigrew, Foreign Affairs: 1.1% over BQ in Papineau, QC (defeated in 2006)
4. Belinda Stronach, Human Resources and Skills Development: 1.3% over Lib in Newmarket—Aurora, ON; elected as a Conservative, Stronach defected to the Liberals on May 17, 2005. (re-elected in 2006)
5. Anne McLellan, Deputy PM/Public Safety: 1.4% over Cons. in Edmonton Centre, AB (defeated in 2006)
6. Tony Valeri, House Leader, 1.9% over NDP in Hamilton East—Stoney Creek, ON (defeated in 2006)
7. Aileen Carroll, International Cooperation, 2.6% over Cons. in Barrie, ON (defeated in 2006)
8. David Emerson, Industry, 3.1% over NDP in Vancouver Kingsway, BC (re-elected in 2006)
9. Jacques Saada, Quebec Economic Development, 4.9% over BQ in Brossard—La Prairie, QC (defeated in 2006)
