= Mauritian nationality law =

Mauritius Citizenship Act

Mauritian National Assembly
- Long title: Mauritius Citizenship Act RL 3/585 – 14 December 1968, as amended by Act No. 24 of 1995
- Enacted by: Government of Mauritius
- Status: Current legislation

Mauritian nationality law is regulated by the Constitution of Mauritius, as amended; the Mauritius Citizenship Act, and its revisions; and various international agreements to which the country is a signatory. These laws determine who is, or is eligible to be, a national of Mauritius. The legal means to acquire nationality, formal legal membership in a nation, differ from the domestic relationship of rights and obligations between a national and the nation, known as citizenship. Nationality describes the relationship of an individual to the state under international law, whereas citizenship is the domestic relationship of an individual within the nation. In Britain and thus the Commonwealth of Nations, though the terms are often used synonymously outside of law, they are governed by different statutes and regulated by different authorities. Mauritian nationality is typically obtained under the principle of jus sanguinis, i.e. by birth in Mauritius or abroad to parents with Mauritian nationality. It can be granted to persons with an affiliation to the country, or to a permanent resident who has lived in the country for a given period of time through naturalisation.

== Acquisition of nationality ==
Nationality can be acquired in Mauritius at birth or later in life through naturalisation.

=== By birth ===
Children born anywhere to at least one parent with Mauritian nationality who was born in Mauritius can acquire nationality at birth; however, children born abroad to Mauritian nationals may not pass on their nationality to their children.

=== By naturalisation ===
Naturalisation can be granted to persons who understand English or another language of the territory and have resided in Mauritius for a sufficient period of time to confirm they understand the customs and traditions of the country. General provisions are that applicants have good character and an understanding of the responsibilities of a citizen. Applicants must typically have resided in the country for six years. Besides foreigners meeting the criteria, other persons who may be registered include:

- Children legally adopted by a Mauritian parent, at the time of completion of a legal adoption automatically acquire Mauritian nationality, with the caveat that if the adoption is by two parents, the male parent must be Mauritian;
- Minor children may be naturalised, at the discretion of authorities, when their parent acquires nationality;
- The spouse of a Mauritian national after four years of residency;
- Commonwealth citizens are granted preferential naturalisation; or
- Persons who have made a substantial investment into the development of the country, $500,000 US since 1999, after completing a two-year residency requirement.

== Loss of nationality ==
Mauritian nationals can renounce their nationality pending approval by the state. Mauritians of origin may not be deprived of their nationality. Naturalised persons may be denaturalised in Mauritius for committing crimes against the state or state security; for ordinary crimes; for disloyal acts or behaving as if one were a citizen of another country, such as voting in an election; for residing outside of the country for an extended period of time without government authorisation; or for fraud, misrepresentation, or concealment in a registration petition. Persons who previously had nationality and wish to repatriate if they voluntarily lost their status because of marriage and the marriage has terminated must request reinstatement.

== Dual nationality ==
Dual nationality is typically allowed in Mauritius for persons of origin since 1995, but is prohibited for naturalised persons.

== Commonwealth citizenship ==
Mauritian citizens are also Commonwealth citizens by default as well.

== History ==
=== Portuguese and Dutch inhabitation (1502–1710) ===
The island now known as Mauritius was first identified on the 1502 Cantino planisphere, along with the islands now known as Réunion and Rodrigues. On the map, the islands were identified as "Dina Margabin" (Île Bourbon/Réunion), "Dina Moraze" (Rodrigues) and "Dina Arobi" (Île de France/Mauritius). In 1507 it was sighted by the Portuguese navigator Diogo Fernandes Pereira, who renamed Dina Arobi the "Ilha do Cirne" (Island of the Swan), after his ship. The three islands were given the name Mascarene Islands after the Portuguese captain Pedro Mascarenhas, though there is no evidence the Portuguese attempted to settle there. In 1598 Dutch Admiral Wybrand van Warwijck claimed the island, renaming it Mauritius to honor Prince Maurice of Nassau. The island became reprovisioning outpost for Dutch, British, and French traders.

Increased trade in the area caused the Dutch to decide on colonization, and in 1638, the Dutch East India Company established a settlement in Grand Port Bay as a base for their trading operations. They established a second trading fort near Port Louis, which they called Noord-Wester Haven to control access to the anchorage there. Because the Dutch colonies were founded as commercial enterprises, nationality did not play a large role in the governance. Roman-Dutch common law, per the Order of Government (Dutch: Ordre van Regieringe) of 1629, was the foundation of their colonial legal code and there was no national civil law defining the rights or obligations of inhabitants. In 1658, they abandoned Mauritius to expand their operations in Dutch Cape Colony, but then returned in 1664. The colony was abandoned again in 1710 and they left behind the animals, crops, and slaves they had introduced to the island.

=== French colony (1715–1814) ===
The French had established a colony on the Île Bourbon in 1665, which by 1674 had become the base of the French East India Company's trading operations in the Indian Ocean. Because of an increasing amount of piracy on Mauritius, which interrupted trade, the French decided to extend their control to the island. In 1715, Guillaume Dufresne d'Arsel, a French naval officer, claimed the island for France and renamed it as the Île de France as he had been instructed to do by Louis Phélypeaux, comte de Pontchartrain, acting on behalf of Louis XIV. An exploration party from Île Bourbon landed on Île de France in 1721 and a permanent settlement was established in 1722 at Port Louis. In 1763, the French East India company sold the Île de France to the government, making it a crown colony and subject to the laws of France, though it operated as a semi-autonomous territory. The Ancien Régime of France developed a system of feudal allegiance in which subjects were bound together by a scheme of protection and service tied to land ownership. Possession of land was typically tied to military and court service and omitted women because they could not perform those obligations. Thus, French nationality also derived from place of birth in French territory, until the nineteenth century, but under feudal law married women were subjugated to the authority of their husbands under coverture.

The French Constitution of 1791, which gave legitimacy to the French Revolution and human rights protections by incorporating the Declaration of the Rights of Man and of the Citizen, did not extend to any of the colonies or possessions of France in Africa, Asia, or the Americas. During the wars which followed the revolution, slavery was abolished in 1794, granting French nationality to all men in the French colonies. Government officials who attempted to enforce the ban on slavery in Île de France were met with resistance from the colonists. The 1802 coup d'état of Napoleon Bonaparte re-established the law and customs in effect before the Revolution of 1789, confusing the status of colonial subjects as one of the laws reinstated re-established slavery. Charles Mathieu Isidore Decaen arrived on Île de France in 1803, as the new governor, and attempted to implement French law. Conflicts between France and Britain which began in that year, extended to their colonies. Britain made plans to capture the Mascarene Islands, taking Rodrigues Island in 1809, Île Bourbon in July 1810, and on 3 December 1810, accepted the surrender of Decaen for the Île de France. Under the terms of the capitulation, French custom, language, laws, property and religion were to remain in force, though the name reverted to Mauritius.

=== British colony (1814–1968) ===
Britain formally acquired Mauritius at the end of the war from the French by virtue of the 1814 Treaty of Paris, establishing British Mauritius, which included the island of Mauritius, the Chagos Archipelago, as well as Oil and Rodrigues Islands. In Britain, allegiance, in which subjects pledged to support a monarch, was the precursor to the modern concept of nationality. The crown recognised from 1350 that all persons born within the territories of the British Empire were subjects. Those born outside the realm — except children of those serving in an official post abroad, children of the monarch, and children born on a British sailing vessel — were considered by common law to be foreigners. Marriage did not affect the status of a subject of the realm, except that under common law, single women, including divorcées, were not allowed to be parents thus their children could not derive nationality maternally and were stateless unless legitimated by their father. Nationality laws passed by the British Parliament were extended only to the Kingdom of Great Britain, and later the United Kingdom of Great Britain and Ireland.

In 1911, at the Imperial Conference a decision was made to draft a common nationality code for use across the British Empire. The British Nationality and Status of Aliens Act 1914 allowed local jurisdictions in the self-governing Dominions to continue regulating nationality in their territories, but also established an imperial nationality scheme throughout the realm. The uniform law, which went into effect on 1 January 1915, required a married woman to derive her nationality from her spouse, meaning if he was British, she was also, and if he was foreign, so was she. It stipulated that upon loss of nationality of a husband, a wife could declare that she wished to remain British and provided that if a marriage had terminated, through death or divorce, a British-born national who had lost her status through marriage could reacquire British nationality through naturalisation without meeting a residency requirement. The statute reiterated common law provisions for natural-born persons born within the realm on or after the effective date. By using the word person, the statute nullified legitimacy requirements for jus soli nationals. For those born abroad on or after the effective date, legitimacy was still required, and could only be derived by a child from a British father (one generation), who was natural-born or naturalised. Naturalisations required five years residence or service to the crown.

Amendments to the British Nationality Act were enacted in 1918, 1922, 1933 and 1943 changing derivative nationality by descent and modifying slightly provisions for women to lose their nationality upon marriage. Because of a rise in statelessness, a woman who did not automatically acquire her husband's nationality upon marriage or upon his naturalisation in another country, did not lose their British status after 1933. The 1943 revision allowed a child born abroad at any time to be a British national by descent if the Secretary of State agreed to register the birth. Under the terms of the British Nationality Act 1948 British nationals in British Mauritius were reclassified at that time as "Citizens of the UK and Colonies" (CUKC). The basic British nationality scheme did not change overmuch, and typically those who were previously defined as British remained the same. Changes included that wives and children no longer automatically acquired the status of the husband or father, children who acquired nationality by descent no longer were required to make a retention declaration, and registrations for children born abroad were extended. In the wake of African independence movements, during the 1960s, several conferences were held in London hoping to maintain the island's ties to Britain. To gain support for independence, in 1965 the Chagos Archipelago was detached from Mauritius, officially becoming part of the British Indian Ocean Territory.

=== Post-independence (1968–present) ===
Mauritius gained its own sovereignty on 12 March 1968. The independence constitution conferred nationality on any CUKC who had been born, naturalised, or registered in Mauritius, including those who had been born in the Chagos Archipelago and did not gain nationality through the Seychelles Colony. Simultaneously, anyone who became a national of Mauritius ceased to be a British national. Provisions ensured that anyone who was ineligible for nationality of Mauritius did not lose their status as a CUKC or as a British Protected Person and that wives of such persons also retained the status of their husband and made provisions for derivative nationality of wives and children of persons who would have obtained Mauritian nationality except for their death. Subsequently, Mauritius passed the Citizenship Act of 14 December 1968, which provided that after independence, children born on the island acquired nationality as long as one parent was Mauritian and their father did not have diplomatic immunity or was not an enemy alien. For those born abroad to a Mauritian father, a child could acquire nationality if their father had been born in Mauritius. Wives of Mauritian men were eligible for Mauritian nationality upon marriage as long as they posed no threat to national security.

In 1995, Mauritius amended both its constitution (Amendment Act No. 23) and the Citizenship Act (Amendment No. 24). The changes to nationality included removing provisions allowing the acquisition of nationality through birth in the territory and simultaneously eliminating gender discrimination from the Citizenship Act, except in the case of joint adoption. Nationality is only automatically acquired upon adoption by two parents if the male parent is Mauritian. Because provisions were removed for qualification of nationality through birth in the territory, the Act is no longer clear as to whether foundlings or orphans discovered in the territory can acquire Mauritian nationality. Mauritius is also among the nine African nations for which no provisions are made for children to acquire nationality if they are born to parents who are stateless or have unknown nationality. Changes made in 1995 allowed Mauritians of origin, but not naturalised Mauritians, to have dual nationality.
