= Victor Dominello =

Australian politician (born 1967)

The Honourable Victor Dominello
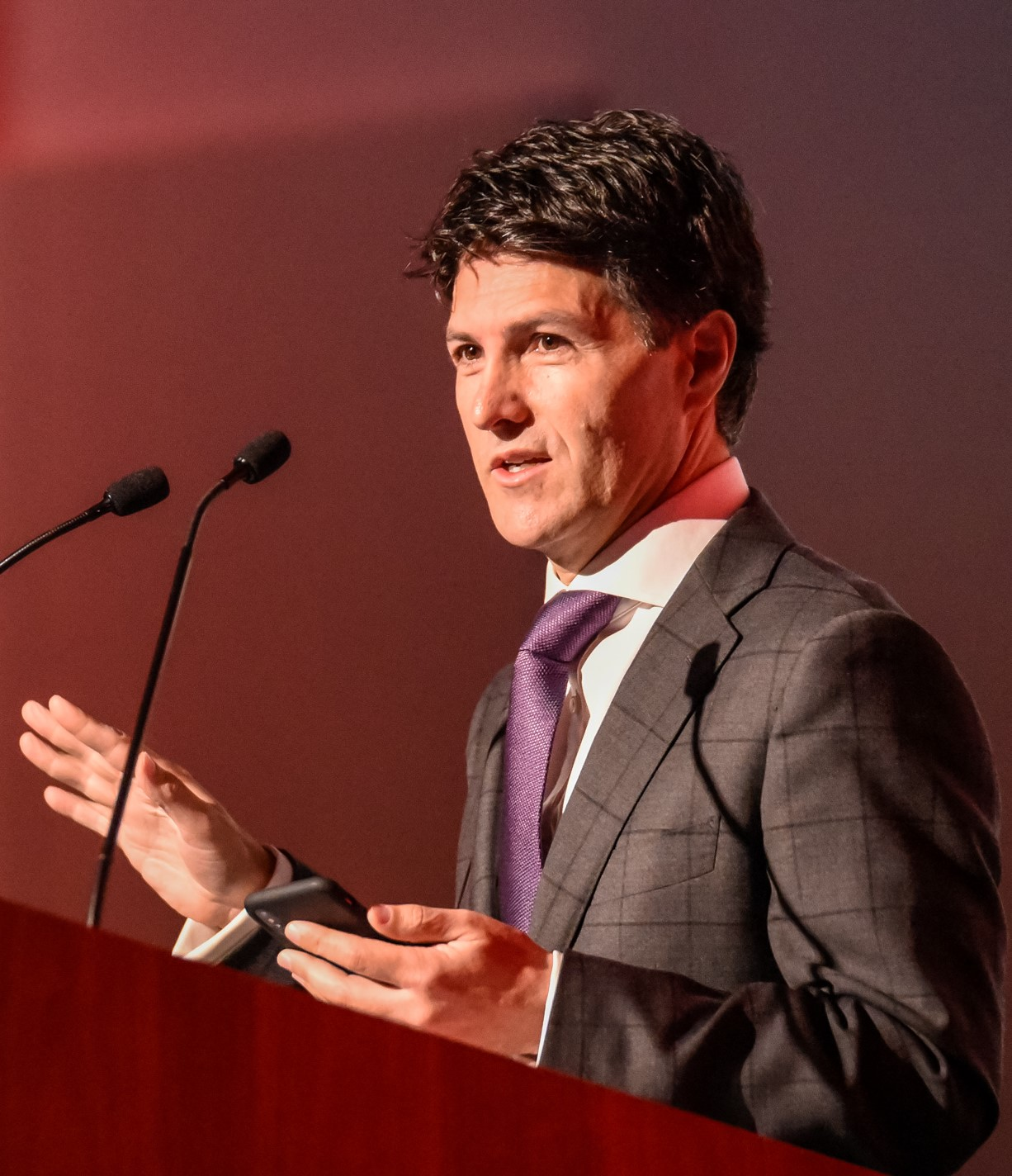
- Dominello in 2018

Minister for Customer Service
- In office 2 April 2019 – 5 April 2023
- Premier: Gladys Berejiklian; Dominic Perrottet
- Preceded by: new portfolio
- Succeeded by: Jihad Dib

Member of the New South Wales Legislative Assembly for Ryde
- In office 28 October 2008 – 3 March 2023
- Preceded by: John Watkins
- Succeeded by: Jordan Lane

Minister for Digital
- In office 31 March 2021 – 5 April 2023
- Premier: Gladys Berejiklian; Dominic Perrottet
- Preceded by: new portfolio
- Succeeded by: Jihad Dib

Minister for Finance, Services and Property
- In office 30 January 2017 – 23 March 2019
- Premier: Gladys Berejiklian
- Preceded by: Dominic Perrottet
- Succeeded by: Damien Tudehope (as Minister for Finance and Small Business)

Minister for Innovation and Better Regulation
- In office 2 April 2015 – 30 January 2017
- Premier: Mike Baird
- Preceded by: Matthew Mason-Cox (as Minister for Fair Trading); John Hatzistergos (as Minister for Regulatory Reform)
- Succeeded by: Matt Kean

Minister for Aboriginal Affairs
- In office 3 April 2011 – 2 April 2015
- Premier: Barry O'Farrell; Mike Baird
- Preceded by: Paul Lynch
- Succeeded by: Leslie Williams

Minister for Citizenship and Communities
- In office 3 April 2011 – 2 April 2015
- Premier: Barry O'Farrell; Mike Baird
- Preceded by: John Hatzistergos (as Minister for Citizenship)
- Succeeded by: John Ajaka (as Minister for Multiculturalism)

Personal details
- Born: 30 July 1967 (age 59) Ryde, New South Wales
- Party: Liberal Party
- Education: Macquarie University
- Profession: Solicitor

Victor Michael Dominello (born 30 July 1967 in Ryde, New South Wales), is an Australian former politician who was the New South Wales Minister for Customer Service in the second Berejiklian ministry from April 2019, and in the Perrottet ministry until March 2023. Dominello was a member of the New South Wales Legislative Assembly, representing the electorate of Ryde for the Liberal Party from 2008 until his retirement in 2023.

He had previously served as the Minister for Finance, Services and Property in the first Berejiklian ministry between January 2017 and March 2019; as the Minister for Innovation and Better Regulation between April 2015 and January 2017 in the second Baird government; as the Minister for Citizenship, Communities and the Minister for Aboriginal Affairs between 2011 and 2015, and the Minister for Veterans Affairs and Assistant Minister for Education between 2014 and 2015, in the O'Farrell and first Baird governments.

After a career as a solicitor and local councillor, Dominello was elected to the Parliament of New South Wales following a Ryde by-election triggered by the resignation of his predecessor John Watkins. The by-election saw Dominello receive a two-party swing of 23.1 points. Dominello increased his margin at the 2011 election; however, the margin was reduced to 11.5 points at the 2015 state election.

During his time in Government, Dominello built a reputation for delivering a number of highly successful digital products, including the FuelCheck app, the ServiceNSW app, ParknPay and Digital Drivers Licence.

Dominello has been credited with helping NSW to become a global leader in digital government services and constantly outranked the other Governments in Australia and New Zealand to lead the Intermedium Digital Government Readiness Index for six years running.

== Early life and career ==
Dominello was born at Ryde Hospital and was educated at Holy Spirit School (North Ryde) and Marist College (Eastwood). He went on to study law at Macquarie University. In 1991, he was admitted as a practitioner of the Supreme Court of New South Wales and the High Court of Australia after taking the solicitor's admission board examinations. In one of his first cases, Dominello represented applicants in the Maralinga cases, who sought compensation following the findings made by the Royal Commission into British nuclear tests in Australia. He successfully obtained an order that the limitation period be significantly extended to enable the applicants' claims to be maintained.

In 1994, Dominello commenced employment with Etheringtons Solicitors of North Sydney, and in 2000 became a partner. In the same year he represented applicants in complex proceedings in the Industrial Relations Commission of New South Wales, where staff members sought damages against members of Parliament and the Speaker of the New South Wales Legislative Assembly for unfair contract. Following his election to the Parliament of New South Wales in October 2008, Dominello stepped down as partner at Etheringtons.

== Political career ==
=== Local government ===
He joined the Liberal Party in the early 1990s, and in 1995 Dominello was elected as a councillor for the City of Ryde. While on Council, Dominello was chair of a number of committees including the development committee and had a significant involvement in the establishment of the Ryde Aquatic Leisure Centre and the development of the Macquarie Business Park. Dominello served two terms, but did not nominate for the 2004 local government elections, citing his desire to concentrate on his legal career, and subsequently let his Liberal membership lapse.

=== New South Wales politics ===
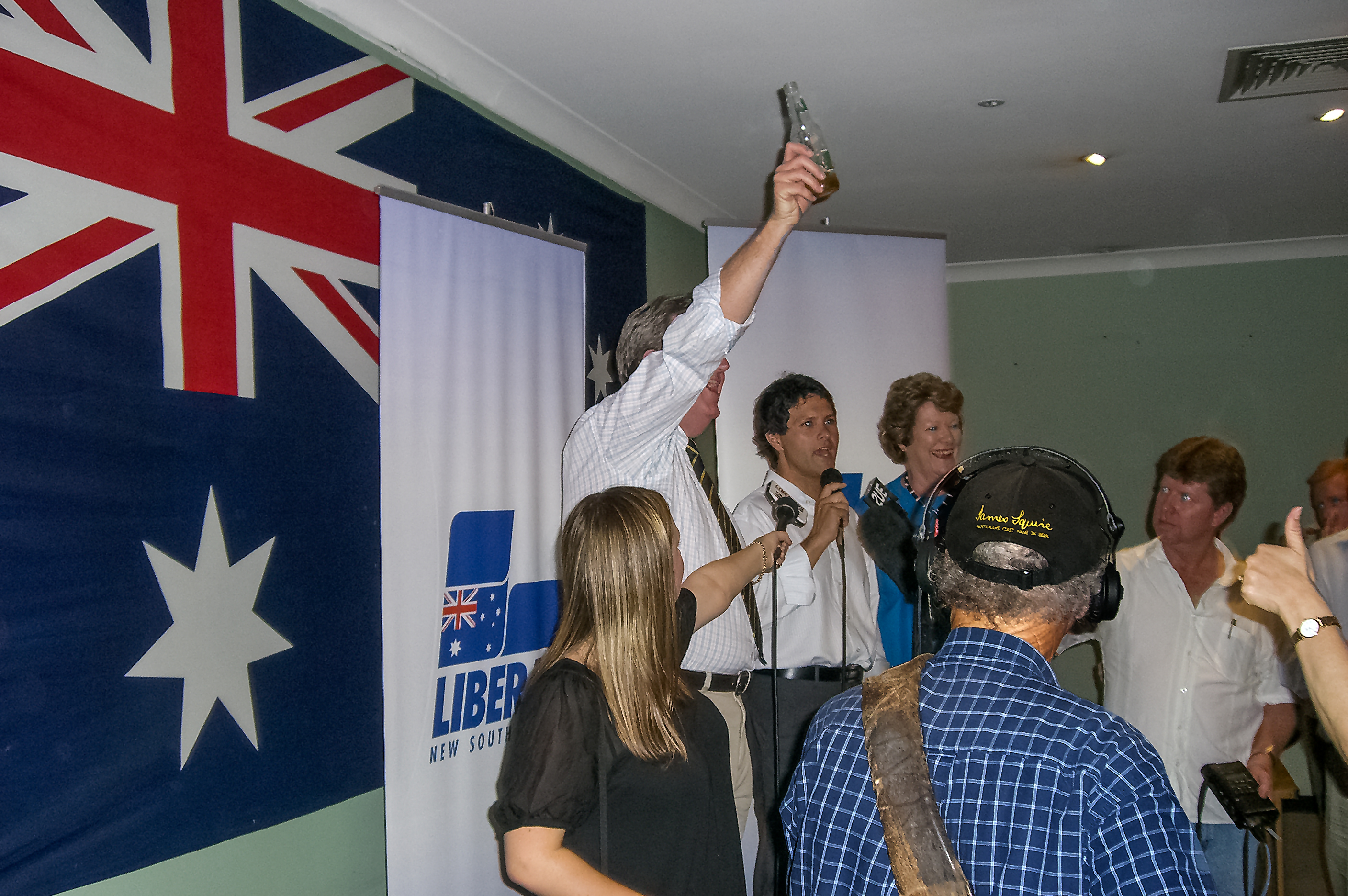
Dominello celebrates his victory in the 2008 Ryde by-election with NSW opposition leader Barry O’Farrell and NSW deputy opposition leader Jillian Skinner.

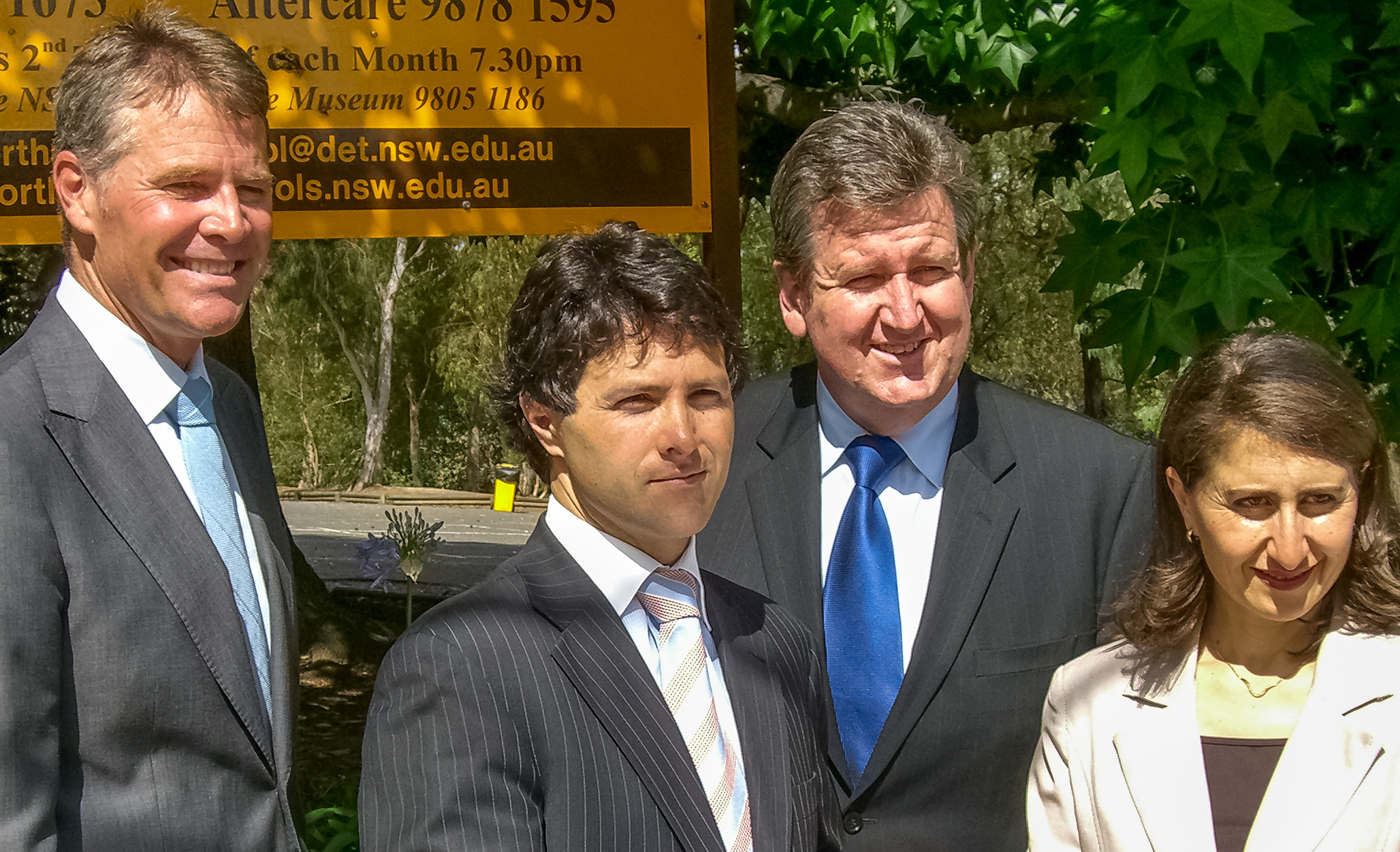
Victor Dominello posing with Andrew Stoner, NSW leader of The Nationals, Barry O'Farrell, NSW Opposition Leader and Gladys Berejiklian, Shadow Minister for Transport in 2008

On 3 September 2008, Labor Deputy Premier John Watkins, who was also the local Member for Ryde, resigned from parliament, resulting in the need for a by-election. Dominello nominated for preselection and won, defeating Ryde Mayor Vic Tagg and several other local party members. On paper, Ryde was a safe Labor seat; Dominello needed a 10-percent swing to win it. However, it was located in territory that had historically been marginal at the federal level. Additionally, the by-election came at a very bad time for the government, whose polling numbers had rapidly tailed off only a year after winning a fourth term. Dominello went into the contest as the overwhelming favourite to win. He duly defeated Labor candidate Nicole Campbell in a landslide, receiving a swing of more than 25 points on the day of the by-election. The swing, at the time the largest a sitting NSW government had ever suffered, turned Ryde into a safe Liberal seat in one stroke. He was subsequently sworn as a member of the Legislative Assembly in on 25 October 2008.

Dominello has spoken in Parliament about a number of local issues including the future of Ryde Hospital, the Homebush V8 Supercar race and the increase to the Parking Space Levy.

=== State government ===
Dominello won the seat in his own right at the 2011 state election, picking up a healthy swing of 12.7 points and increasing his vote to 75 percent, making Ryde the 10th-safest Liberal seat. Following the electoral victory of the O'Farrell government at that election, Dominello was appointed as the Minister for Citizenship, Communities and the Minister for Aboriginal Affairs. Due to the resignation of Barry O'Farrell as Premier, and the subsequent ministerial reshuffle by Mike Baird, the new Liberal Leader, in April 2014 in addition to his existing responsibilities as a minister, Dominello was appointed as the Minister for Veterans Affairs and the Assistant Minister for Education. Following the 2015 state election, Dominello was sworn in as the inaugural Minister for Innovation and Better Regulation in the second Baird government. In 2017 Dominello was appointed as the Minister for Finance, Services and Property in the first Berejiklian ministry. Following the 2019 state election, Dominello was sworn in as the Minister for Customer Service in the second Berejiklian ministry, with effect from 2 April 2019. Dominello was additionally appointed Minister for Digital on 31 March 2021.

== Post political career ==
Victor is a co-founder of ServiceGen whose motto is "Government Services Profoundly Reimagined". According to its website, the company’s mission is to empower individuals and communities through a profound shift in Government service delivery.

Victor is the Chief Executive Officer of Future Government Institute

In November 2023, Victor Dominello was appointed by the Federal Minister for Government Services, Bill Shorten, to lead a new advisory group designing the future of Mygov.

Victor was also appointed to the Tech Council of Australia Board in 2023 and concluded his tenure in December 2025 . In addition, he is also an Associate Professor at University of NSW and a member of the UTS Trustworthy Digital Society Hub.

== Personal life and health ==
In December 2013, Victor was featured at the Sydney Morning Herald championing multiculturalism and discussed how he is proud of his Italian heritage. He also mentioned being proud to be from a migrant family and said "I am a product of Ryde" earlier in his career.

In September 2018, Dominello broke an arm while arm-wrestling NSW Attorney-General Mark Speakman in an office.

On 18 August 2021, while fronting the media in a press conference, Dominello's face was seen to be drooping and he was blinking slowly with his left eye. Concerned viewers contacted his office to urge him to seek medical help, which he did later that afternoon and was diagnosed with Bell's palsy. On subsequent days, he wore an eyepatch to prevent infection.

New South Wales Legislative Assembly
Preceded by John Watkins	Member for Ryde; 2008–2023	Succeeded by Jordan Lane
Political offices
New title	Minister for Customer Service; 2019–2023	Succeeded by Jihad Dib
Preceded by Dominic Perrottet	Minister for Finance, Services and Property; 2017–2019	Succeeded by Damien Tudehope as Minister for Finance and Small Business
Preceded by Matthew Mason-Cox as Minister for Fair Trading	Minister for Innovation and Better Regulation; 2015–2017	Succeeded by Matt Kean
Vacant Title last held by John Hatzistergos as Minister for Regulatory Reform	Minister for Innovation and Better Regulation; 2015–2017	Succeeded by Matt Kean
Preceded by John Hatzistergos as Minister for Citizenship	Minister for Citizenship and Communities; 2011–2015	Succeeded by John Ajaka as Minister for Multiculturalism
Preceded by Paul Lynch	Minister for Aboriginal Affairs; 2011–2015	Succeeded by Leslie Williams
Vacant Title last held by Frank Terenzini as Minister Assisting the Premier on Veterans Affairs	Minister for Veterans Affairs; 2014–2015	Succeeded by David Elliott
Vacant Title last held by Kerry Chikarovski	Assistant Minister for Education; 2014–2015	Succeeded by Leslie Williams
