= Plus Architecture =

International architecture practice

Plus Studio
- Formerly: Plus Architecture
- Company type: Private
- Industry: Architecture
- Founded: 1997
- Headquarters: Melbourne, Victoria, Australia
- Area served: Australia and New Zealand
- Key people: Ian Briggs; Matthew Charles; Hamish Davies; Gabriel Duque; Amit Julka; Danny Juric; Sumedh Kataria; Michael McShanag; Candice Ng; Rido Pin; Patric Przeradzki; William Schofield; Rainer Strunz
- Services: Architectural design, urban design, interior design

Plus Studio (formerly Plus Architecture) is an international architecture practice, with eleven studios across Australia and New Zealand. It was founded in Melbourne in 1997.

On August 22 2025, the practice rebranded from Plus Architecture to Plus Studio.

It has studios in Melbourne, Brisbane, Sydney, Christchurch, Auckland, Perth, and the Gold Coast.

The directors are Ian Briggs, Matthew Charles, Hamish Davies, Gabriel Duque, Amit Julka, Danny Juric, Sumedh Kataria, Michael McShanag, Candice Ng, Rido Pin, Patric Przeradzki, William Schofield, and Rainer Strunz.
