= City of Ryde =

- Local government area
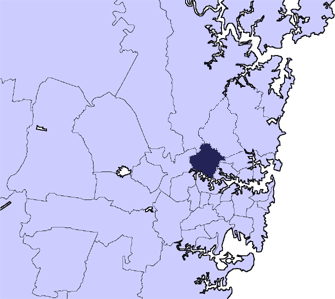
- Location in Metropolitan Sydney

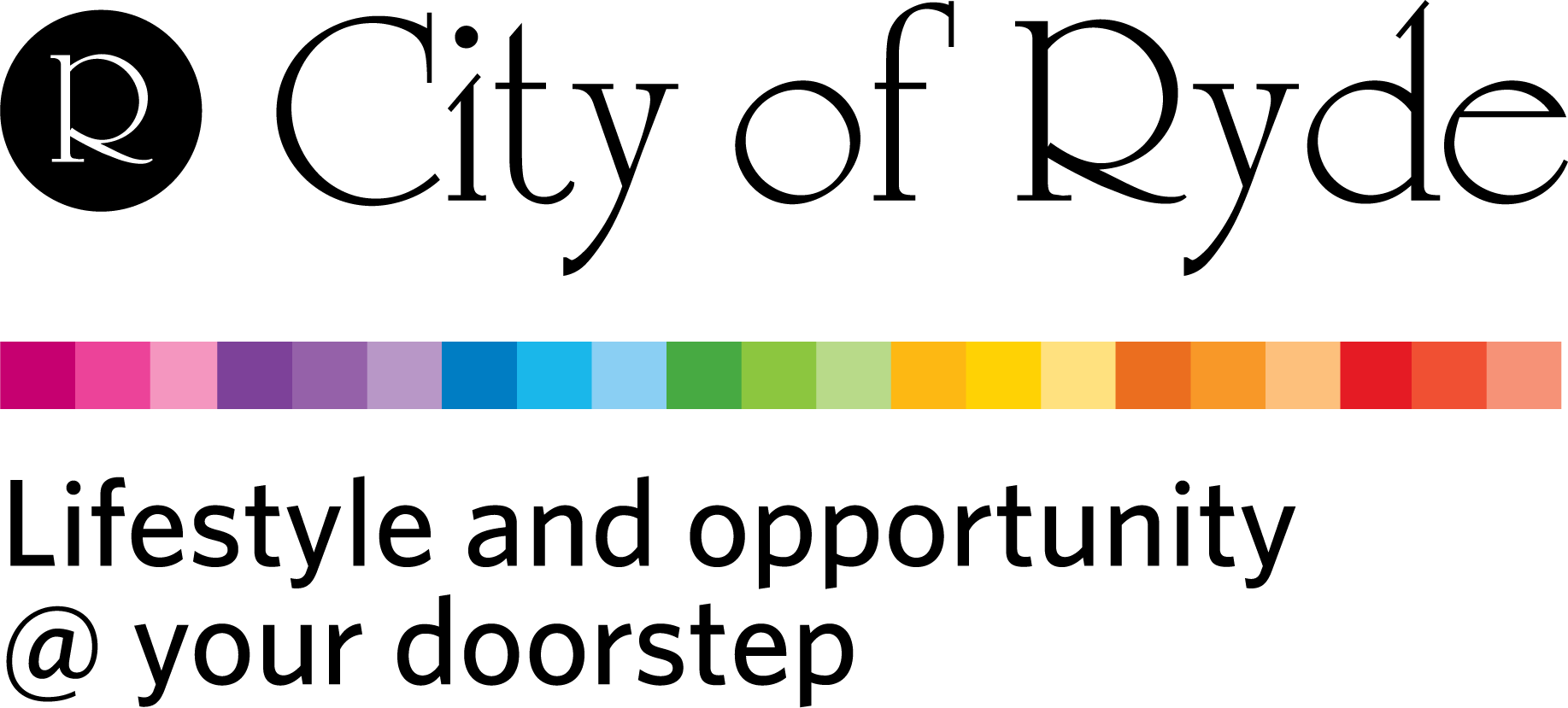
- Interactive map of City of Ryde
- Coordinates: 33°49′S 151°06′E
- Country: Australia
- State: New South Wales
- Region: Northern Sydney
- Established: 11 November 1870
- Council seat: Ryde

Government
  - Mayor: Trenton Brown
  - State electorates: Epping; Lane Cove; Ryde
  - Federal division: Bennelong

Area
  - Total: 40.651 km^{2} (15.695 sq mi)

Population
  - Totals: 129,123 (2021 census); 131,271 (2023 est.)
  - Density: 3,176.38/km^{2} (8,226.78/sq mi)
- County: Cumberland
- Parish: Field of Mars; Hunter's Hill
- Website: City of Ryde
LGAs around City of Ryde
Hornsby	Ku-ring-gai	Willoughby
Parramatta	City of Ryde	Lane Cove
Parramatta	Canada Bay	Hunter's Hill

The City of Ryde is a local government area in the Northern Sydney region, in New South Wales, Australia. It was first established as the Municipal District of Ryde in 1870, became a municipality in 1906 and was proclaimed as the City of Ryde in 1992.

The local government area extends from the Parramatta River to the Lane Cove River which encircles the area in the north, and is bounded in the east by the peninsula of Hunters Hill and the City of Parramatta in the west. The City comprises an area of 40.651 square kilometres (15.695 sq mi) and as at the 2021 census had an estimated population of 129,123.

The mayor of the City of Ryde since 28 March 2024 is Councillor Trenton Brown, a member of the Liberal Party.

== Suburbs and localities in the local government area ==
The following suburbs and localities are within the City of Ryde:

- Chatswood West (shared with City of Willoughby)
- Denistone
- Denistone East
- Denistone West
- East Ryde
- Eastwood (shared with City of Parramatta)
- Gladesville (shared with Municipality of Hunter's Hill)
- Macquarie Centre
- Macquarie Park
- Macquarie University campus
- Marsfield
- Meadowbank
- Melrose Park (shared with City of Parramatta)
- North Ryde
- Putney
- Ryde
- Tennyson Point
- Top Ryde
- West Ryde

== Heritage listings ==
The City of Ryde has a number of heritage-listed sites, including:

- Denistone, 1-13 Pennant Avenue: The Hermitage
- Eastwood, Marsden Road: Brush Farm
- Gladesville, 144 Ryde Road: Gladesville Drill Hall
- Ryde, 782 Victoria Road: Willandra, Ryde
- Ryde, 808-810 Victoria Road: Ryde police station
- Ryde, 813 Victoria Road: Addington House
- Ryde, 817 Victoria Road: The Retreat, Ryde
- West Ryde, 135 Marsden Road: Riverview House, West Ryde
- West Ryde, Victoria Road: Ryde Pumping Station

== Demographics ==
At the 2021 census, there were 129,123 people in the Ryde local government area, of these 48.8% identified as male and 51.2% identified as female. Aboriginal and Torres Strait Islander people made up 0.5% of the population. The median age of people in the City of Ryde was 37 years. Children aged 0 – 14 years made up 16.2% of the population and people aged 65 years and over made up 14.3% of the population. Of people in the area aged 15 years and over, 51% were married and 8.3% were either divorced or separated.

Population growth in the City of Ryde between the 2006 Census and the 2011 Census was 6.28%, and in the subsequent five years to the 2016 Census, population growth was 12.87%. When compared with total population growth of Australia of 8.81% during the same period, population growth in the Ryde local government area was approximately 50% higher than the national average. The median weekly income for residents within the City of Ryde was around 25% above the national average. At the 2021 Census, the Ryde local government area was linguistically diverse, with a significantly higher than average proportion (55.3%) where two or more languages are spoken (the national average was 24.8%); and a significantly lower proportion (46.3%) where English only was spoken at home (national average was 72.0%).

Selected historical census data for Ryde local government area
Census year		2001	2006	2011	2016	2021
Population	Estimated residents on census night	▲94,244	▲96,948	▲103,038	▲116,302	▲129,123
Population	LGA rank in terms of size within New South Wales			22nd	22nd	
Population	% of New South Wales population	1.49%	▼1.48%	▲1.49%	▲1.56%	▲1.59%
Population	% of Australian population	0.50%	▼0.49%	▼0.48%	▲0.50%	0.50%
Cultural and language diversity						
Ancestry, top responses	Australian			17.0%	▼14.1%	▼16.1%
Ancestry, top responses	English			16.9%	▼15.1%	▲16.9%
Ancestry, top responses	Chinese			15.7%	▲19.2%	▲26.1%
Ancestry, top responses	Irish			6.3%	▼5.8%	▲6.1%
Ancestry, top responses	Italian			5.4%	▼5.1%	▲6.1%
Language, top responses (other than English)	Mandarin	3.0%	▲5.9%	▲8.6%	▲12.7%	▲13.8%
Language, top responses (other than English)	Cantonese	6.4%	▲7.0%	▲7.1%	▼7.0%	▲7.2%
Language, top responses (other than English)	Korean	2.4%	▲3.0%	▲3.9%	▲4.7%	▼4.5%
Language, top responses (other than English)	Italian	3.5%	▼3.1%	▼2.8%	▼2.2%	▼1.7%
Language, top responses (other than English)	Armenian	2.1%	2.1%	▼1.9%	-	-
Language, top responses (other than English)	Arabic				1.7%	▼1.6%
Religious affiliation						
Religious affiliation, top responses	Catholic	32.1%	▼30.6%	▼29.4%	▼25.3%	▼22.9%
Religious affiliation, top responses	No religion	13.7%	▲17.4%	▲22.4%	▲30.2%	▲36.7%
Religious affiliation, top responses	Anglican	16.9%	▼14.2%	▼12.0%	▼8.6%	▼6.6%
Religious affiliation, top responses	Buddhism	n/c	▲3.6%	▲4.4%	▼4.1%	-
Religious affiliation, top responses	Presbyterian and Reformed	3.9%	▼3.8%	3.8%	-	-
Median weekly incomes						
Personal income	Median weekly personal income		$528	▲$635	▲$738	▲$967
Personal income	% of Australian median income		113.3%	▲110.1%	▲111.5%	▲120.1%
Family income	Median weekly family income		$1,158	▲$1,841	▲$2,106	▲$2,519
Family income	% of Australian median income		112.8%	▲124.3%	▲121.5%	▼118.8%
Household income	Median weekly household income		$1,486	▼$1,466	▲$1,786	▲$2,098
Household income	% of Australian median income		126.9%	▼118.8%	▲120.2%	▼120.1%
Dwelling structure						
Dwelling type	Separate house	56.2%	▼54.5%	▼52.8%	▼47.3%	▼40.8%
Dwelling type	Semi-detached, terrace or townhouse	13.0%	15.1%▲	15.1%	▲16.3%	▼14.3%
Dwelling type	Flat or apartment	29.5%	▲30.0%	▲31.9%	▲35.6%	▲44.6%

== Council ==
=== Current composition and election method ===
The City of Ryde is composed of twelve councillors elected proportionally as three separate wards, each electing four councillors. All councillors are elected for a fixed four-year term of office. The mayor since 2024 is directly elected for a four-year term. The most recent election was held on 14 September 2024. The makeup of the council is as follows:

Party	Councillors
Liberal Party of Australia	8
Australian Labor Party	3
Independent	2
Total	13

The current Council, elected in 2024 is:

Ward	Councillor	Party	Notes
Mayor	Trenton Brown	Liberal	Elected 2017, Mayor 2024 - present. First directly elected Mayor of Ryde
Central Ward	Daniel Han	Liberal	Elected 2022, Deputy Mayor September 2023 – present
Central Ward	Lyndal Howison	Labor	
Central Ward	Shweta Deshpande	Liberal	Elected 2021, Deputy Mayor March–September 2023.
Central Ward	Tina Kordrostami	Independent	Elected as a NSW Greens candidate, resigned from the party in June 2025.
East Ward	Penny Pedersen	Labor	Elected 2017.
East Ward	Roy Maggio	Independent	Elected 2008; Mayor 2013–2014; Deputy Mayor 2009–2010, 2014–2016, 2021–2022.
East Ward	Keanu Arya	Liberal	
East Ward	Sophie Lara-Watson	Liberal	
West Ward	Justin Li	Liberal	Elected 2008–2017, 2022–present; Deputy Mayor, 2012–2014. Jerome Laxale (Labor) resigned on 22 July 2022; by-election held on 15 October 2022.
West Ward	Kathy Tracey	Liberal	
West Ward	Felix Lo	Labor	
West Ward	Cameron Last	Liberal	

=== Referendum on the position of mayor ===
A referendum was also undertaken at the election held on 4 December 2021, asking residents the following question: "Do you support a popularly elected Mayor where the voters of the City of Ryde elect the Mayor for a four (4) year term, thereby adopting a thirteen (13) Councillor model (including the Mayor)?". The final declared results were: 76.18% YES and 23.82% NO. As a result, the position of mayor was directly elected from the next local government elections scheduled for 2024.

== Election results ==
=== 2024 ===
2024 New South Wales local elections: Ryde
Party	Votes	%	Swing	Seats	Change
Liberal	28,550	44.1	+8.9	7	▲1
Labor	18,853	29.1	−6.8	3	▼2
Roy Maggio Independents	11,405	17.6		1	Steady
Greens	5,257	8.1	−2.7	1	▲1
Peter Kim Independent Team	1,663	2.6		0	Steady
Unity	842	1.3		0	Steady
Formal votes	64,790	93.9			
Informal votes	4,235	6.1			
Total	69,025				

2024 New South Wales mayoral elections: Ryde
Party	Candidate	Votes	%	±%
Liberal	Trenton Brown	27,324	41.03	+41.03
Labor	Bernard Purcell	16,422	24.66	+24.66
Roy Maggio Independents	Roy Maggio	14,694	22.07	+22.07
Greens	Tina Kordrostami	8,152	12.24	+12.24
Total formal votes		66,592	96.31	
Informal votes		2,550	3.69	
Turnout		69,142	86.17	
Two-candidate-preferred result
Liberal	Trenton Brown	30,248	56.51	+56.51
Labor	Bernard Purcell	23,276	43.49	+43.49
Liberal hold		Swing	N/A	

- This was the first time the position of mayor of Ryde was directly elected instead of appointed by councillors
- Trenton Brown (Liberal) was the incumbent mayor going into the elections, having been appointed on 28 March 2024

== Council history ==
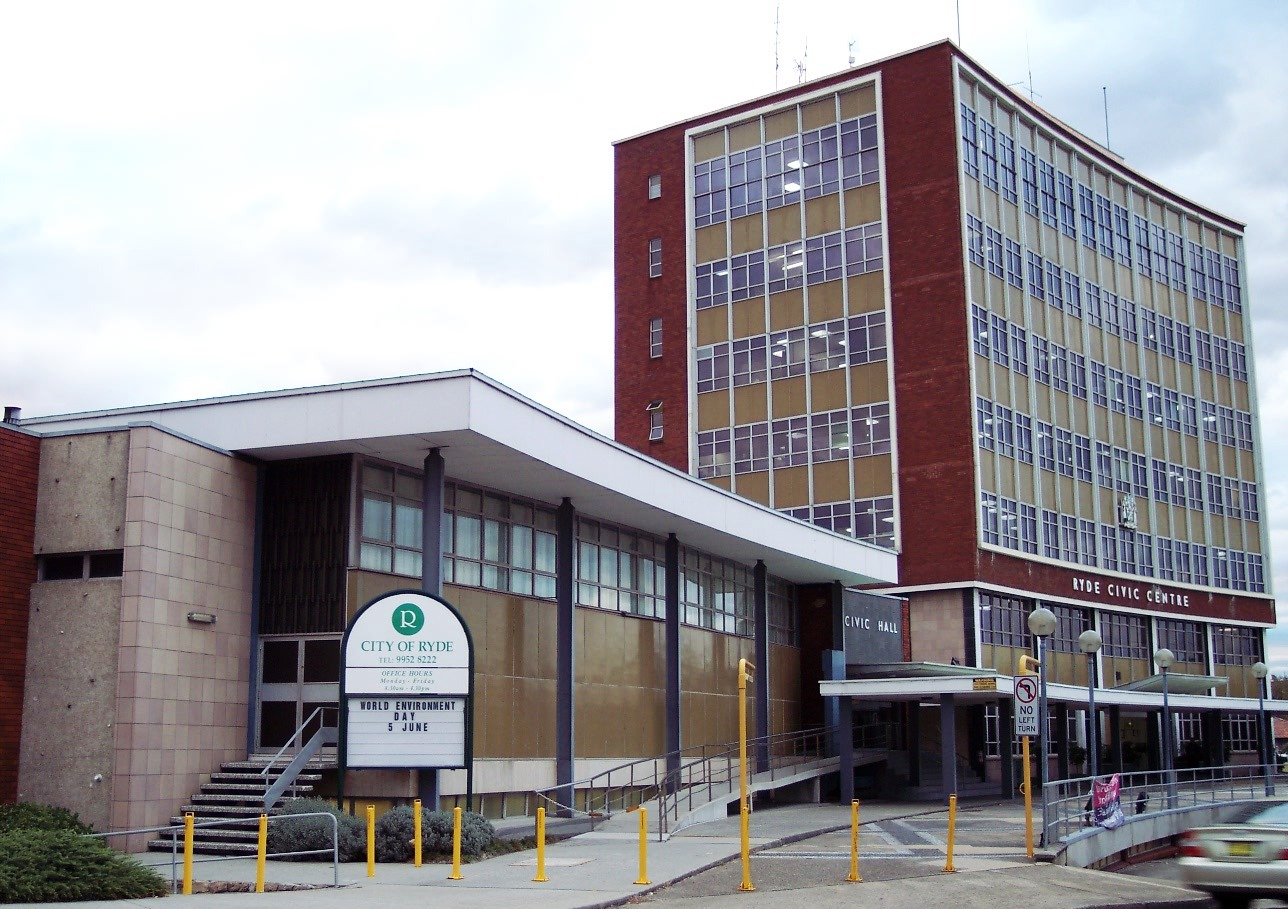
Ryde Civic Centre (1964) by Buckland & Druce architects, was the council seat from 1964 to 2016. It was demolished in 2021.

In June 1870, 201 residents of the district of Ryde sent a petition to the governor, requesting the incorporation of the "Municipal District of Ryde". This resulted in the municipality being formally proclaimed on 11 November 1870. With a total land area of 40.6 square kilometres, Ryde was the largest Sydney municipality. However, due to an error in the proclamation regarding the western boundary, a new proclamation was made on 11 June 1872.

In June 1894 the northern section of the municipality known as Marsfield, was proclaimed as the "Municipal District of Marsfield". In 1907, Marsfield became known as the Municipality of Eastwood, and lasted until it was re-amalgamated with Ryde following the passing of the Local Government (Areas) Act 1948.

With the passing of the Local Government Act 1906, the council name was changed to be the "Municipality of Ryde". The City of Ryde was proclaimed by the Governor, Peter Sinclair, on 20 September 1991, and with the passing of the Local Government Act 1993, aldermen were also retitled councillors and the town clerk became the general manager.

A 2015 review of local government boundaries by the NSW Government Independent Pricing and Regulatory Tribunal recommended that the City of Ryde merge with adjoining councils. The government proposed a merger of the Hunter's Hill, Lane Cove and Ryde Councils to form a new council with an area of 57 square kilometres (22 sq mi) and support a population of approximately 164,000. In July 2017, the Berejiklian government decided to abandon the forced merger of the Hunter's Hill, Lane Cove and Ryde local government areas, along with several other proposed forced mergers.

=== Town Clerks and General Managers ===
Name	Term	Notes
George Miller Pope	1870 – 18 February 1887	
William Short	1 March 1887 – 6 January 1902	
Nelson Kirby	20 March 1903 – July 1904	
Joseph Parry	18 July 1904 – June 1919	
Donald Neil Morrison	August 1919 – 11 November 1936	
F. C. Taylor	12 April 1937 – 28 February 1949	
E. Gyllies	28 February 1949 – 1951	
Mervyn Leslie Donnelly	1951–1968	
A. G. Sindel	1968–1975	
K. R. Brown	1975–1989	
K. J. King	1989–1994	
Gerry Brus	1994–2000	
Michael McMahon	January 2001 – August 2004	
Michael Whittaker	October 2004 – October 2009	
John Neish	4 January 2010 – 12 February 2013	
Danielle Dickson (acting)	12 February 2013 – August 2013	
Roy Newsome (acting)	August 2013 – 22 August 2014	
Dominic Johnson (acting)	22 August 2014 – 12 January 2015	
Gail Connolly	12 January 2015 – 17 May 2016	
Roy Newsome (acting)	17 May 2016 – July 2017	
George Dedes	July 2017 – 1 July 2022	
Wayne Rylands	1 July 2022 – present	

== International relations ==
- (United Kingdom) Ryde, Isle of Wight

== Coat of arms ==
Coat of arms of the City of Ryde
Notes Designed by the Chester Herald, Walter Verco. Adopted 19 November 1963. Formal grant by the Kings of Arms, 20 January 1964 (Earl Marshal's Warrant, 7 September 1963). Crest On a Wreath of the Colours (Argent and Vert), a Sea Horse couchant Azure, charged on the shoulder with a representation of the Constellation of the Southern Cross Argent, in the mouth a Waratah Flower slipped and leaved proper, and supporting with the dexter leg a Cog Wheel Or. Helm A closed helmet. Escutcheon Vert, on a Chevron the point ensigned with a Cross Formy Argent, between in chief two Apples slipped and leaved, and in base a Sun rising Or, a pair of Dividers Gules, on a Chief wavy Barry wavy Azure and Argent a Cornu copia fesswise Or. Supporters On the dexter side a Private of Marines of the late Eighteenth Century, accoutred and armed, and on the sinister side a Colonial Settler also of that period supporting with the exterior hand a Musket all proper. Compartment A grassy mound proper. Motto Progress Through Endeavour Other elements Mantling Vert doubled Or. Symbolism Escutcheon: The green field alludes to the rural nature of the early Ryde district, and the white chevron signifies Ryde's residential areas. The red dividers in the refers to town planning and the Ryde Housing Scheme, which was established in the late 1930s by the council to develop affordable housing in the area. The apex of the chevron is a cross pattée representing Christianity, and references the establishment of St Anne's Church in Ryde in 1826. The two golden apples are symbolic of the orchard industry and the creation of the Granny Smith apple in Eastwood in 1868. The rising sun recalls the district's original name, "Eastern Farms". The position of Ryde on the northern side of the Parramatta River and its position along the Lane Cove River is also referenced with the blue and white wavy bars. The cornucopia is a symbol of the early agricultural industry of the region and the transport of produce by the waterways. Crest: The seahorse is taken from the 1869 coat of arms granted to the Borough of Ryde, on the Isle of Wight, and also references the waterways. The seahorse is charged with the Southern Cross for Australia. The Waratah in the seahorse's mouth is the State Floral Emblem of New South Wales and also appears in the mayoral chain. The golden cogwheel between the seahorse's legs denotes the flourishing of industry. Supporters: The Private of Marines supporter alludes to the fact that two Royal Marines were the first local land grantees, when Governor Arthur Phillip granted the first parcels of land in the district in 1792, and which likely resulted in the naming of the Parish of Field of Mars. The positioning of the marine and the colonist is meant to represent the pioneers at the Field of Mars on the west; and at Hunter's Hill Parish, and Eastern Farms, or Kissing Point, on the east.

== See also ==
- City of Ryde Libraries
