= Electoral results for the district of North Shore =

Election results for North Shore, New South Wales, Australia

North Shore, an electoral district of the Legislative Assembly in the Australian state of New South Wales, has had two incarnations, the first from 1920 to 1927 as a five-member electorate, the second from 1981 to the present as a single-member electorate.

== Members ==
First incarnation (1920–1927)
Election	Member	Party	Member	Party	Member	Party	Member	Party	Member	Party
1920	Alfred Reid	Ind. Nationalist	Arthur Cocks	Nationalist	Reginald Weaver	Nationalist	Richard Arthur	Nationalist	Cecil Murphy	Labor
1922	William Fell	Independent Coalitionist	Arthur Cocks	Nationalist	Reginald Weaver	Nationalist	Richard Arthur	Nationalist	Cecil Murphy	Labor
1925 apt	William Fell	Independent Coalitionist	Alfred Reid	Nationalist	Reginald Weaver	Nationalist	Richard Arthur	Nationalist	Cecil Murphy	Labor
1925	William Fell	Independent Coalitionist	Alfred Reid	Nationalist	Alick Kay	Independent	Richard Arthur	Nationalist	Cecil Murphy	Labor
1926 apt	William Fell	Independent Coalitionist	Alfred Reid	Nationalist	Arthur Tonge	Labor	Richard Arthur	Nationalist	Cecil Murphy	Labor
Second incarnation (1981–present)
Election	Member	Party								
1981	Ted Mack	Independent								
1984	Ted Mack	Independent								
1988	Robyn Read	Independent								
1991	Phillip Smiles	Liberal								
1994 by	Jillian Skinner	Liberal								
1995	Jillian Skinner	Liberal								
1999	Jillian Skinner	Liberal								
2003	Jillian Skinner	Liberal								
2007	Jillian Skinner	Liberal								
2011	Jillian Skinner	Liberal								
2015	Jillian Skinner	Liberal								
2017 by	Felicity Wilson	Liberal								
2019	Felicity Wilson	Liberal								
2023	Felicity Wilson	Liberal								

== Election results ==
=== Elections in the 2020s ===
==== 2023 ====
2023 New South Wales state election: North Shore
Party	Candidate	Votes	%	±%
Liberal	Felicity Wilson	21,308	44.23	−2.37
Independent	Helen Conway	10,527	21.85	+21.85
Labor	Godfrey Santer	8,239	17.10	+4.75
Greens	James Mullan	5,305	11.01	−0.28
Independent	Victoria Walker	1,107	2.30	+2.30
Sustainable Australia	Lachlan Commins	901	1.87	+0.49
Informed Medical Options	Michael Antares	790	1.64	+1.64
Total formal votes		48,177	98.08	−0.44
Informal votes		945	1.92	+0.44
Turnout		49,122	87.03	−0.61
Notional two-party-preferred count
Liberal	Felicity Wilson	24,208	58.22	−9.63
Labor	Godfrey Santer	17,371	41.78	+9.63
Two-candidate-preferred result
Liberal	Felicity Wilson	23,040	55.69	−5.44
Independent	Helen Conway	18,329	44.31	+44.31
Liberal hold				

=== Elections in the 2010s ===
==== 2019 ====
2019 New South Wales state election: North Shore
Party	Candidate	Votes	%	±%
Liberal	Felicity Wilson	22,261	46.60	−11.46
Independent	Carolyn Corrigan	9,341	19.55	+19.55
Labor	Michael Lester	5,900	12.35	−1.44
Greens	Toby Pettigrew	5,393	11.29	−3.32
Keep Sydney Open	Colin Furphy	1,993	4.17	+4.17
Animal Justice	Olivia Bouchier	827	1.73	+1.73
Liberal Democrats	Sam Gunning	785	1.64	+1.64
Sustainable Australia	Victoria Boast	661	1.38	+1.38
Conservatives	Jeffrey Grimshaw	613	1.28	+1.28
Total formal votes		47,774	98.52	+0.48
Informal votes		719	1.48	−0.48
Turnout		48,493	87.64	−0.53
Two-party-preferred result
Liberal	Felicity Wilson	25,032	67.85	−4.07
Labor	Michael Lester	11,863	32.15	+4.07
Two-candidate-preferred result
Liberal	Felicity Wilson	23,917	61.13	−10.06
Independent	Carolyn Corrigan	15,209	38.87	+38.87
Liberal hold				

==== 2017 by-election ====
New South Wales state by-election, 2017: North Shore
Party	Candidate	Votes	%	±%
Liberal	Felicity Wilson	18,081	42.8	−15.3
Independent	Carolyn Corrigan	10,122	23.9	+23.9
Greens	Justin Alick	6,723	15.9	+1.3
Independent	Ian Mutton	3,456	8.2	+8.2
Independent	Harry Fine	1,182	2.8	+2.8
Voluntary Euthanasia	Brian Beaumont Owles	998	2.4	+2.4
Animal Justice	Ila Lessing	911	2.2	+2.2
Christian Democrats	Silvana Nile	819	1.9	+1.1
Total formal votes		42,292	98.1	+0.0
Informal votes		837	1.9	−0.0
Turnout		43,129	78.8	−9.4
Two-candidate-preferred result
Liberal	Felicity Wilson	19,733	54.7	−16.5
Independent	Carolyn Corrigan	16,334	45.3	+45.3
Liberal hold				

Jillian Skinner (Liberal) resigned.

==== 2015 ====
2015 New South Wales state election: North Shore
Party	Candidate	Votes	%	±%
Liberal	Jillian Skinner	26,853	58.1	−9.3
Greens	Arthur Chesterfield-Evans	6,755	14.6	−5.6
Labor	James Wheeldon	6,378	13.8	+3.0
Independent	Stephen Ruff	4,655	10.1	+10.1
Cyclists	Pip Vice	838	1.8	+1.8
No Land Tax	Moya Kertesz	390	0.8	+0.8
Christian Democrats	Giuseppe Rotiroti	386	0.8	−0.9
Total formal votes		46,255	98.0	+0.4
Informal votes		926	2.0	−0.4
Turnout		47,181	88.2	+0.6
Notional two-party-preferred count
Liberal	Jillian Skinner	28,874	71.9	−8.5
Labor	James Wheeldon	11,278	28.1	+8.5
Two-candidate-preferred result
Liberal	Jillian Skinner	28,613	71.2	−2.1
Greens	Arthur Chesterfield-Evans	11,579	28.8	+2.1
Liberal hold		Swing	−2.1	

==== 2011 ====
2011 New South Wales state election: North Shore
Party	Candidate	Votes	%	±%
Liberal	Jillian Skinner	30,424	67.3	+13.9
Greens	Andrew Robjohns	9,143	20.2	+2.3
Labor	Tabitha Winton	4,881	10.8	−7.0
Christian Democrats	David Kelly	766	1.7	+0.0
Total formal votes		45,214	98.0	+0.2
Informal votes		905	2.0	−0.2
Turnout		46,119	89.5	+0.5
Notional two-party-preferred count
Liberal	Jillian Skinner	32,416	80.3	+11.1
Labor	Tabitha Winton	7,939	19.7	−11.1
Two-candidate-preferred result
Liberal	Jillian Skinner	31,305	73.2	+7.4
Greens	Andrew Robjohns	11,460	26.8	−7.4
Liberal hold		Swing	+7.4	

=== Elections in the 2000s ===
==== 2007 ====
2007 New South Wales state election: North Shore
Party	Candidate	Votes	%	±%
Liberal	Jillian Skinner	22,531	53.4	+3.5
Greens	Lynne Saville	7,553	17.9	+2.4
Labor	Tabitha Winton	7,523	17.8	−7.1
Independent	Jim Reid	3,080	7.3	+0.9
Democrats	Jan De Voogd	781	1.9	+0.2
Christian Democrats	David Brock	720	1.7	+1.7
Total formal votes		42,188	97.9	−0.6
Informal votes		926	2.1	+0.6
Turnout		43,114	89.0	
Notional two-party-preferred count
Liberal	Jillian Skinner	24,911	69.2	+7.1
Labor	Tabitha Winton	11,099	30.8	–7.1
Two-candidate-preferred result
Liberal	Jillian Skinner	24,299	65.8	+3.7
Greens	Lynne Saville	12,602	34.2	+34.2
Liberal hold		Swing	+3.7	

==== 2003 ====
2003 New South Wales state election: North Shore
Party	Candidate	Votes	%	±%
Liberal	Jillian Skinner	19,865	50.3	−3.6
Labor	Tabitha Winton	9,825	24.9	−3.0
Greens	Ted Nixon	6,116	15.5	+8.5
Independent	Jim Reid	2,560	6.5	+6.5
Democrats	Allen Frick	649	1.6	−6.4
Unity	Xiaogang Zhang	512	1.3	+1.3
Total formal votes		40,160	98.4	+0.2
Informal votes		633	1.6	−0.2
Turnout		40,160	87.0	
Two-party-preferred result
Liberal	Jillian Skinner	21,559	62.3	+0.0
Labor	Tabitha Winton	13,052	37.7	-0.0
Liberal hold		Swing	+0.0	

=== Elections in the 1990s ===
==== 1999 ====
1999 New South Wales state election: North Shore
Party	Candidate	Votes	%	±%
Liberal	Jillian Skinner	20,994	53.9	−8.2
Labor	Janet McDonald	10,888	27.9	+7.8
Democrats	Brenda Padgett	3,121	8.0	−1.3
Greens	David Bell	2,743	7.0	−0.8
One Nation	David Kelly	867	2.2	+2.2
AAFI	Lindon Dedman	346	0.9	+0.2
Total formal votes		38,959	98.3	+1.6
Informal votes		386	1.7	−1.6
Turnout		39,645	88.8	
Two-party-preferred result
Liberal	Jillian Skinner	22,495	62.3	−8.0
Labor	Janet McDonald	13,624	37.7	+8.0
Liberal hold		Swing	−8.0	

==== 1995 ====
1995 New South Wales state election: North Shore
Party	Candidate	Votes	%	±%
Liberal	Jillian Skinner	19,756	60.9	+9.8
Labor	Lynda Voltz	6,703	20.7	+12.8
Democrats	Linda Wade	3,039	9.4	+9.4
Greens	Mervyn Murchie	2,940	9.1	+9.1
Total formal votes		32,438	96.7	+2.3
Informal votes		1,107	3.3	−2.3
Turnout		33,545	91.1	
Two-party-preferred result
Liberal	Jillian Skinner	21,481	69.2	+16.7
Labor	Lynda Voltz	9,554	30.8	+30.8
Liberal hold		Swing	+16.7	

==== 1994 by-election ====
1994 North Shore by-election Saturday 5 February
Party	Candidate	Votes	%	±%
Liberal	Jillian Skinner	15,267	54.7	+3.6
Independent	Robyn Read	10,408	37.3	−3.8
Independent	Gerry Nolan	878	3.1	
Independent	Jim Reid	787	2.8	
Democrats	Alec Cater	590	2.1	
Total formal votes		27,930	98.3	+3.9
Informal votes		473	1.7	−3.9
Turnout		28,403	76.0	−14.2
Two-candidate-preferred result
Liberal	Jillian Skinner	15,905	58.4	+5.9
Independent	Robyn Read	11,338	41.6	−5.9
Liberal hold		Swing	+5.9	

Phillip Smiles (Liberal) resigned.

==== 1991 ====
1991 New South Wales state election: North Shore
Party	Candidate	Votes	%	±%
Liberal	Phillip Smiles	15,422	51.1	+1.6
Independent	Robyn Read	12,389	41.0	+7.4
Labor	Steven Torpey	2,388	7.9	−7.3
Total formal votes		30,199	94.4	−3.4
Informal votes		1,786	5.6	+3.4
Turnout		31,985	90.3	
Two-candidate-preferred result
Liberal	Phillip Smiles	15,613	52.5	−0.4
Independent	Robyn Read	14,132	47.5	+0.4
Liberal notional hold		Swing	−0.4	

The sitting member was Robyn Read (Independent) however North Shore became a notional Liberal seat as a result of the 1990 redistribution.

=== Elections in the 1980s ===
==== 1988 by-election ====
1988 North Shore by-election Saturday 5 November
Party	Candidate	Votes	%	±%
Independent	Robyn Read	11,523	51.8	
Liberal	Jillian Skinner	7,913	35.6	−1.5
Labor	Kirk McKenzie	1,625	7.3	
Democrats	Burnum Burnum	718	3.2	
Nuclear Disarmament	Robert Wood	462	2.1	
Total formal votes		22,241	98.2	+0.2
Informal votes		402	1.8	−0.2
Turnout		22,643	70.1	−19.1
Two-candidate-preferred result
Independent	Robyn Read	13,838	63.0	
Liberal	Jillian Skinner	8,129	37.0	−3.1 (Note: compared to the two-candidate-preferred result for the 1988 North Shore election.)
Independent hold		Swing		

Ted Mack (Independent) resigned.

==== 1988 ====
1988 New South Wales state election: North Shore
Party	Candidate	Votes	%	±%
Independent	Ted Mack	13,684	49.3	+13.3
Liberal	Jillian Skinner	10,283	37.0	−5.2
Labor	Peter Blakey	3,108	11.2	−8.5
Independent	Mary Day	698	2.5	+2.5
Total formal votes		27,773	98.0	−0.1
Informal votes		554	2.0	+0.1
Turnout		28,327	89.1	
Two-candidate-preferred result
Independent	Ted Mack	16,257	59.9	+4.1
Liberal	Jillian Skinner	10,876	40.1	−4.1
Independent hold		Swing	+4.1	

==== 1984 ====
1984 New South Wales state election: North Shore
Party	Candidate	Votes	%	±%
Independent	Ted Mack	11,122	42.2	+13.5
Liberal	Jillian Skinner	10,850	41.2	−0.4
Labor	Peter Semmler	4,365	16.6	−11.6
Total formal votes		26,337	98.4	−0.1
Informal votes		436	1.6	+0.1
Turnout		26,773	88.5	+4.4
Two-candidate-preferred result
Independent	Ted Mack	15,043	57.7	+3.1
Liberal	Jillian Skinner	11,037	42.3	−3.1
Independent hold		Swing	+3.1	

==== 1981 ====
1981 New South Wales state election: North Shore
Party	Candidate	Votes	%	±%
Liberal	Bruce McDonald	10,359	41.6	−12.2
Independent	Ted Mack	7,163	28.7	+28.7
Labor	Maurice May	7,036	28.2	−18.0
Democrats	Norman Ward	362	1.5	+1.5
Total formal votes		24,920	97.8	
Informal votes		559	2.2	
Turnout		25,479	84.1	
Two-candidate-preferred result
Independent	Ted Mack	13,130	54.6	+54.6
Liberal	Bruce McDonald	10,936	45.4	−8.4
Independent notional gain from Liberal		Swing	+54.6	

District recreated

==== 1927–1981 ====
District abolished

=== Elections in the 1920s ===
==== 1926 appointment ====
Alick Kay, who had been elected as an independent, resigned on 28 July 1926 to accept appointment to the Metropolitan Meat Board. Which party interest Kay supported was determined by the Clerk of the Assembly after considering the votes of the late member on any motion of censure. Kay had supported the Lang Government in votes of confidence in the Assembly, the clerk therefore declared Kay represented the interests of the Labor Party. Arthur Tonge had the most votes of the unsuccessful Labor candidates at the 1925 election and took his seat on 22 September 1926.

==== 1925 ====
1925 New South Wales state election: North Shore
Party	Candidate	Votes	%	±%
Quota		8,768		
Nationalist	Richard Arthur (elected 1)	10,898	20.7	+9.9
Nationalist	Alfred Reid (elected 4)	5,853	11.1	+2.3
Nationalist	Ernest Marks	3,005	5.7	+5.7
Nationalist	Ernest Salmon	2,713	5.2	+5.2
Nationalist	William Wood	1,442	2.7	+2.7
Labor	Cecil Murphy (elected 2)	8,362	15.9	−0.5
Labor	Arthur Tonge	3,338	6.4	+6.3
Labor	Bertrand Childs	1,226	2.3	+2.3
Labor	Oliver Kelly	107	0.2	+0.2
Labor	Samuel Sloane	78	0.2	+0.2
Ind. Nationalist	William Fell (elected 3)	6,965	13.2	+1.9
Independent	Alick Kay (elected 5)	5,126	9.7	+9.7
Independent	Mary Williams	2,278	4.3	+4.3
Independent	Alfred Waterhouse	657	1.3	+1.3
Protestant Labour	Raymond Campbell-Cowan	542	1.0	+1.0
Independent	Harry Meatheringham	14	0.03	−0.08
Total formal votes		52,604	97.5	−0.2
Informal votes		1,335	2.5	+0.2
Turnout		53,939	69.7	−3.1
Party total votes
Nationalist		23,911	45.4	−14.2
Labor		13,111	24.9	+6.9
Ind. Nationalist	William Fell	6,965	13.2	+1.9
Independent	Alick Kay	5,126	9.7	+9.7
Independent	Mary Williams	2,278	4.3	+4.3
Independent	Alfred Waterhouse	657	1.3	+1.3
Protestant Labour		542	1.0	+1.0
Independent	Harry Meatheringham	14	0.03	−0.08

==== 1925 appointment ====
Arthur Cocks resigned on 14 February 1925 to accept appointment to the position of Agent-General for NSW in London. Between 1920 and 1927 the Legislative Assembly was elected using a form of proportional representation with multi-member seats and a single transferable vote (modified Hare-Clark). The Parliamentary Elections (Casual Vacancies) Act, provided that casual vacancies were filled by the next unsuccessful candidate "who represents the same party interest as the late member". As there were no unsuccessful Nationalist candidates, Cocks was replaced by another Nationalist member, Alfred Reid, who took his seat on 24 March 1925.

==== 1922 ====
1922 New South Wales state election: North Shore
Party	Candidate	Votes	%	±%
Quota		8,456		
Nationalist	Reginald Weaver (elected 1)	10,226	20.2	+4.9
Nationalist	Richard Arthur (elected 4)	5,488	10.8	−3.4
Nationalist	Arthur Cocks (elected 3)	5,483	10.8	+2.8
Nationalist	Alfred Reid (defeated)	4,469	8.8	
Nationalist	Arthur Walker	2,493	4.9	
Nationalist	Albert Whatmore	2,088	4.12	
Labor	Cecil Murphy (elected 2)	8,302	16.4	+8.5
Labor	James Donaldson	505	1.0	+1.0
Labor	John Cochran	206	0.4	+0.4
Labor	Arthur Tonge	63	+0.1	+0.1
Labor	William Killingsworth	43	0.1	+0.1
Ind. Coalitionist	William Fell (elected 5)	5,727	11.3	+11.3
Democratic	Timothy O'Donoghue	3,569	7.0	−0.3
Independent	Jacob Fotheringham	1,381	2.7	+2.7
Independent	Edward Clark	633	1.3	−1.5
Independent	Harry Meatheringham	58	0.1	+0.1
Total formal votes		50,734	97.7	+10.4
Informal votes		1,205	2.3	−10.4
Turnout		51,939	72.8	+16.8
Party total votes
Nationalist		30,247	59.6	+13.7
Labor		9,119	18.0	−0.3
Ind. Coalitionist	William Fell	5,727	11.3	+11.3
Democratic		3,569	7.0	−0.3
Independent	Jacob Fotheringham	1,381	2.7	+2.7
Independent	Edward Clark	633	1.3	−1.5
Independent	Harry Meatheringham	58	0.1	+0.1

==== 1920 ====
1920 New South Wales state election: North Shore
Party	Candidate	Votes	%	±%
Quota		5,211		
Nationalist	Reginald Weaver (elected 1)	4,786	15.3	
Nationalist	Richard Arthur (elected 3)	4,425	14.2	
Nationalist	Arthur Cocks (elected 4)	2,492	8.0	
Nationalist	Percy Colquhoun (defeated)	1,873	6.0	
Nationalist	Richard Lambton	773	2.5	
Labor	Cecil Murphy (elected 2)	2,461	7.9	
Labor	Henry Willis	1,181	3.8	
Labor	Alexander Campbell	1,132	3.6	
Labor	Alfred Warton	557	1.8	
Labor	Albert Roberts	395	1.3	
Progressive	Arthur Walker	1,752	5.6	
Progressive	Frank Farnell	451	1.4	
Progressive	Francis Killeen	376	1.2	
Progressive	Archie Ogilvy	139	0.4	
Ind. Nationalist	Alfred Reid (elected 5)	2,628	8.4	
Democratic	Timothy O'Donoghue	2,297	7.4	
Women's Party (1920)	Mary Booth	1,610	5.2	
Soldiers & Citizens	Edward Cortis	692	2.2	
Soldiers & Citizens	Richard Fitz-Gerald	341	1.1	
Independent	Edward Clark	879	2.8	
Independent	Frederick Clancy	20	0.1	
Total formal votes		31,260	88.3	
Informal votes		4,535	12.7	
Turnout		35,795	56.0	
Party total votes
Nationalist		14,349	45.9	
Labor		5,726	18.3	
Progressive		2,718	8.7	
Ind. Nationalist	Alfred Reid	2,628	8.4	
Democratic		2,297	7.4	
Women's Party (1920)		1,610	5.2	
Soldiers & Citizens		1,033	3.3	
Independent	Edward Clark	879	2.8	
Independent	Frederick Clancy	20	0.1	
