= Results of the 1935 New South Wales state election =

State election for New South Wales, Australia in May 1935

New South Wales state election, 11 May 1935 Legislative Assembly << 1932–1938 >>
Enrolled voters	1,347,884 (Note: There were 1,528,713 enrolled voters but 180,829 were enrolled in 11 electorates (five UAP, four Country and two Labor) which were uncontested at the election.)				
Votes cast	1,255,419		Turnout	96.06	−0.34
Informal votes	39,333		Informal	3.04	0.83
Summary of votes by party
Party	Primary votes	%	Swing	Seats	Change
Labor (NSW)	532,486	42.42	+2.26	29	+ 5
United Australia	415,485	33.10	–3.64	38	– 5
Country	162,178	12.92	–0.24	23	± 0
Federal Labor	59,694	4.75	+0.51	0	± 0
Communist	19,105	1.52	+0.60	0	± 0
Ind. United Australia	11,114	0.89	+0.21	0	± 0
Centre	7,489	0.60	+0.60	0	± 0
Independent Labor	3,774	0.30	+0.16	0	± 0
Social Credit	1,996	0.16	+0.16	0	± 0
Independents	42,098	3.35	+1.17	0	± 0
Total	1,255,419			90	

The 1935 New South Wales state election was for 90 electoral districts each returning a single member with compulsory preferential voting.

== Results by electoral district ==
=== Albury ===
1935 New South Wales state election: Albury
Party	Candidate	Votes	%	±%
United Australia	Alexander Mair	7,086	59.0	+28.4
Labor (NSW)	Edward Jones	4,918	41.0	+0.9
Total formal votes		12,004	98.4	−0.7
Informal votes		192	1.6	+0.7
Turnout		12,196	95.5	−0.7
United Australia hold		Swing	+0.9	

=== Annandale ===
1935 New South Wales state election: Annandale
Party	Candidate	Votes	%	±%
Labor (NSW)	Bob Gorman	11,075	71.4	+8.3
Federal Labor	John Keegan	4,431	28.6	+22.4
Total formal votes		15,506	95.3	−1.7
Informal votes		767	4.7	+1.7
Turnout		16,273	95.5	−0.1
Labor (NSW) hold		Swing	N/A	

=== Armidale ===
1935 New South Wales state election: Armidale
Party	Candidate	Votes	%	±%
Country	David Drummond	unopposed		
Country hold				

=== Arncliffe ===
1935 New South Wales state election: Arncliffe
Party	Candidate	Votes	%	±%
Labor (NSW)	Joseph Cahill	8,438	46.1	+0.5
United Australia	Horace Harper	8,036	43.9	−4.4
Federal Labor	Northey Du Maurier	959	5.2	0.0
Independent	William Yewdall	666	3.6	+3.6
Centre	Enoch Jones	199	1.1	+1.1
Total formal votes		18,298	97.5	−1.0
Informal votes		471	2.5	+1.0
Turnout		18,769	97.6	0.0
Two-party-preferred result
Labor (NSW)	Joseph Cahill	9,439	51.6	+3.1
United Australia	Horace Harper	8,859	48.4	−3.1
Labor (NSW) gain from United Australia		Swing	+3.1	

=== Ashburnham ===
1935 New South Wales state election: Ashburnham
Party	Candidate	Votes	%	±%
Country	Hilton Elliott	6,986	52.9	+19.5
Labor (NSW)	William Keast	6,228	47.1	+5.4
Total formal votes		13,214	98.9	+0.4
Informal votes		150	1.1	−0.4
Turnout		13,364	96.8	−0.3
Country hold		Swing	−4.1	

=== Ashfield ===
1935 New South Wales state election: Ashfield
Party	Candidate	Votes	%	±%
United Australia	Athol Richardson	8,511	52.8	−19.5
Labor (NSW)	Robert Bruce	4,425	27.5	−0.2
Ind. United Australia	Milton Jarvie (defeated)	3,177	19.7	+19.7
Total formal votes		16,113	98.5	+0.2
Informal votes		247	1.5	−0.2
Turnout		16,360	96.7	+0.3
United Australia hold		Swing	N/A	

- Preferences were not distributed.

=== Auburn ===
1935 New South Wales state election: Auburn
Party	Candidate	Votes	%	±%
Labor (NSW)	Jack Lang	10,316	56.6	+4.6
Federal Labor	Ben Chifley	7,916	43.4	+3.5
Total formal votes		18,232	98.3	+0.7
Informal votes		321	1.7	−0.7
Turnout		18,553	96.3	+0.3
Labor (NSW) hold		Swing	N/A	

=== Balmain ===
1935 New South Wales state election: Balmain
Party	Candidate	Votes	%	±%
Labor (NSW)	John Quirk	10,417	63.9	+4.1
Federal Labor	Allan Howie	5,046	30.9	−2.3
Communist	Lawrence Sharkey	849	5.2	+2.7
Total formal votes		16,312	97.2	−1.0
Informal votes		471	2.8	+1.0
Turnout		16,783	97.1	+0.3
Labor (NSW) hold		Swing	N/A	

- Preferences were not distributed.

=== Bankstown ===
1935 New South Wales state election: Bankstown
Party	Candidate	Votes	%	±%
Labor (NSW)	James McGirr	11,808	53.6	+5.5
United Australia	Julian De Meyrick	9,258	42.0	+5.1
Communist	Frederick Loveday	963	4.4	+2.8
Total formal votes		22,029	97.8	+0.4
Informal votes		491	2.2	−0.4
Turnout		22,520	96.6	+0.4
Labor (NSW) hold		Swing	N/A	

- Preferences were not distributed.

=== Barwon ===
1935 New South Wales state election: Barwon
Party	Candidate	Votes	%	±%
Country	Benjamin Wade	8,148	57.9	+4.7
Labor (NSW)	John O'Connor	5,934	42.1	+5.3
Total formal votes		14,082	97.1	−1.5
Informal votes		416	2.9	+1.5
Turnout		14,498	93.2	−2.1
Country hold		Swing	N/A	

=== Bathurst ===
1935 New South Wales state election: Bathurst
Party	Candidate	Votes	%	±%
Country	Gordon Wilkins (defeated)	6,141	44.1	−4.9
Labor (NSW)	Gus Kelly	5,298	38.0	−9.4
Federal Labor	Martin Griffin	2,492	17.9	+17.9
Total formal votes		13,931	98.4	+0.5
Informal votes		219	1.6	−0.5
Turnout		14,150	97.6	−0.1
Two-party-preferred result
Labor (NSW)	Gus Kelly	7,190	51.6	+2.8
Country	Gordon Wilkins	6,741	48.4	−2.8
Labor (NSW) gain from Country		Swing	+2.8	

=== Bondi ===
1935 New South Wales state election: Bondi
Party	Candidate	Votes	%	±%
United Australia	Norman Thomas	12,978	63.8	+1.6
Labor (NSW)	Jack Fitzpatrick	7,374	36.2	+3.7
Total formal votes		20,352	98.3	+0.3
Informal votes		346	1.7	−0.3
Turnout		20,698	96.0	−0.2
United Australia hold		Swing	N/A	

=== Botany ===
1935 New South Wales state election: Botany
Party	Candidate	Votes	%	±%
Labor (NSW)	Bob Heffron	unopposed		
Labor (NSW) hold				

=== Bulli ===
1935 New South Wales state election: Bulli
Party	Candidate	Votes	%	±%
Labor (NSW)	John Sweeney	8,382	80.7	+17.9
Communist	Patrick McHenry	2,002	19.3	+16.0
Total formal votes		10,384	81.7	−17.1
Informal votes		2,323	18.3	+17.1
Turnout		12,707	96.4	−0.9
Labor (NSW) hold		Swing	N/A	

=== Burwood ===
1935 New South Wales state election: Burwood
Party	Candidate	Votes	%	±%
United Australia	Gordon Jackett	11,316	62.4	−1.4
Labor (NSW)	Arthur Dowd	5,035	27.8	−5.0
Independent	George Bland	1,792	9.9	+9.9
Total formal votes		18,143	98.5	−0.5
Informal votes		270	1.5	+0.5
Turnout		18,413	96.5	+0.5
United Australia hold		Swing	N/A	

- Preferences were not distributed.

=== Byron ===
1935 New South Wales state election: Byron
Party	Candidate	Votes	%	±%
Country	Arthur Budd	7,012	52.2	−26.6
Labor (NSW)	John Rogan	3,396	25.3	+4.1
Independent	Frederick Stuart	3,012	22.4	+22.4
Total formal votes		13,420	98.4	+0.1
Informal votes		214	1.6	−0.1
Turnout		13,634	94.5	−1.7
Country hold		Swing	N/A	

- Preferences were not distributed.

=== Canterbury ===
1935 New South Wales state election: Canterbury
Party	Candidate	Votes	%	±%
Labor (NSW)	Arthur Tonge	9,355	50.6	+4.0
United Australia	Edward Hocking	8,462	45.7	+0.2
Federal Labor	Albert Gardiner	689	3.7	−3.8
Total formal votes		18,506	98.4	+0.1
Informal votes		291	1.6	−0.1
Turnout		18,797	97.6	+1.4
Labor (NSW) gain from United Australia		Swing	N/A	

- Preferences were not distributed.

=== Casino ===
1935 New South Wales state election: Casino
Party	Candidate	Votes	%	±%
Country	John Reid	9,302	71.1	−3.0
Labor (NSW)	Leonard Sweeney	3,771	28.9	+4.2
Total formal votes		13,073	98.7	+1.4
Informal votes		171	1.3	−1.4
Turnout		13,244	93.8	−3.4
Country hold		Swing	N/A	

=== Castlereagh ===
1935 New South Wales state election: Castlereagh
Party	Candidate	Votes	%	±%
Country	Alfred Yeo	6,944	51.6	+1.0
Labor (NSW)	Joseph Clark	6,517	48.4	+7.1
Total formal votes		13,461	98.4	−0.3
Informal votes		218	1.6	+0.3
Turnout		13,679	95.0	−1.2
Country hold		Swing	N/A	

=== Cessnock ===
1935 New South Wales state election: Cessnock
Party	Candidate	Votes	%	±%
Labor (NSW)	Jack Baddeley	12,099	68.4	−5.1
Independent	Eugene O'Neill	3,827	21.6	+21.6
Communist	Charles Evans	1,764	10.0	+4.9
Total formal votes		17,690	97.6	+0.9
Informal votes		442	2.4	−0.9
Turnout		18,132	96.2	−0.4
Labor (NSW) hold		Swing	N/A	

- Preferences were not distributed.

=== Clarence ===
1935 New South Wales state election: Clarence
Party	Candidate	Votes	%	±%
Country	Alfred Henry	8,641	61.4	−38.6
Country	Bertie Eggins	3,296	23.4	+23.4
Independent	William Robinson	2,147	15.2	+15.2
Total formal votes		14,084	96.4	
Informal votes		528	3.6	
Turnout		14,612	96.0	
Country hold		Swing	N/A	

- Preferences were not distributed.

=== Cobar ===
1935 New South Wales state election: Cobar
Party	Candidate	Votes	%	±%
Labor (NSW)	Mat Davidson	7,978	70.3	+10.1
Federal Labor	Joseph Bowe	3,370	29.7	+18.0
Total formal votes		11,348	96.5	−1.8
Informal votes		408	3.5	+1.8
Turnout		11,756	91.9	−1.0
Labor (NSW) hold		Swing	N/A	

=== Concord ===
1935 New South Wales state election: Concord
Party	Candidate	Votes	%	±%
United Australia	Stan Lloyd	9,101	50.9	−5.2
Labor (NSW)	Alan McNamara	7,151	40.0	−3.2
Federal Labor	Henry McDicken	1,219	6.8	+6.8
Centre	Aubrey Murphy	391	2.2	+2.2
Total formal votes		17,862	97.9	−0.6
Informal votes		383	2.1	+0.6
Turnout		18,245	97.7	+0.4
United Australia hold		Swing	N/A	

- Preferences were not distributed.

=== Coogee ===
1935 New South Wales state election: Coogee
Party	Candidate	Votes	%	±%
United Australia	John Dunningham	13,629	67.1	−0.1
Labor (NSW)	Karl Guhl	6,681	32.9	+3.0
Total formal votes		20,310	98.0	0.0
Informal votes		416	2.0	0.0
Turnout		20,726	94.9	−0.3
United Australia hold		Swing	N/A	

=== Cootamundra ===
1935 New South Wales state election: Cootamundra
Party	Candidate	Votes	%	±%
Country	Bill Ross	6,863	52.7	+2.4
Labor (NSW)	Ken Hoad	6,167	47.3	+3.7
Total formal votes		13,030	98.5	−0.6
Informal votes		195	1.5	+0.6
Turnout		13,225	97.8	+0.5
Country hold		Swing	N/A	

=== Corowa ===
1935 New South Wales state election: Corowa
Party	Candidate	Votes	%	±%
Country	Richard Ball	unopposed		
Country hold				

=== Croydon ===
1935 New South Wales state election: Croydon
Party	Candidate	Votes	%	±%
United Australia	Bertram Stevens	11,058	64.5	−5.9
Labor (NSW)	Archibald Pattinson	4,083	23.8	−5.8
Social Credit	Harold Bondeson	1,996	11.7	+11.7
Total formal votes		17,137	98.4	−0.5
Informal votes		282	1.6	+0.5
Turnout		17,419	95.9	+0.6
United Australia hold		Swing	N/A	

- Preferences were not distributed.

=== Drummoyne ===
1935 New South Wales state election: Drummoyne
Party	Candidate	Votes	%	±%
United Australia	John Lee	10,803	60.0	+16.4
Labor (NSW)	Michael Croot	7,186	40.0	+4.6
Total formal votes		17,989	97.5	−0.1
Informal votes		458	2.5	+0.1
Turnout		18,447	97.4	+0.2
United Australia hold		Swing	+0.5	

=== Dubbo ===
1935 New South Wales state election: Dubbo
Party	Candidate	Votes	%	±%
Country	George Wilson	7,568	55.0	+6.3
Labor (NSW)	Alfred McClelland	6,184	45.0	+8.8
Total formal votes		13,752	98.4	−0.2
Informal votes		220	1.6	+0.2
Turnout		13,972	96.6	+1.9
Country hold		Swing	N/A	

=== Dulwich Hill ===
1935 New South Wales state election: Dulwich Hill
Party	Candidate	Votes	%	±%
United Australia	John Ness	12,074	61.9	+16.8
Labor (NSW)	Frank Connors	7,429	38.1	+6.2
Total formal votes		19,503	98.2	−0.7
Informal votes		359	1.8	+0.7
Turnout		19,862	96.7	+0.5
United Australia hold		Swing	+0.4	

=== Georges River ===
1935 New South Wales state election: Georges River
Party	Candidate	Votes	%	±%
United Australia	Cecil Monro	10,770	51.7	−4.0
Labor (NSW)	Ted Kinsella	9,315	44.7	+6.1
Centre	James Fowler	762	3.7	+3.7
Total formal votes		20,847	97.5	−1.0
Informal votes		527	2.5	+1.0
Turnout		21,374	96.6	−0.4
United Australia hold		Swing	N/A	

- Preferences were not distributed.

=== Glebe ===
1935 New South Wales state election: Glebe
Party	Candidate	Votes	%	±%
Labor (NSW)	Bill Carlton	8,846	59.0	−2.6
Independent	Henry Wood	3,676	24.5	+24.5
Independent	Bertie Lewis	1,894	12.6	+12.6
Communist	Tom Dowling	566	3.8	+1.4
Total formal votes		14,982	97.8	−0.3
Informal votes		338	2.2	+0.3
Turnout		15,320	95.6	+0.6
Labor (NSW) hold		Swing	N/A	

=== Gloucester ===
1935 New South Wales state election: Gloucester
Party	Candidate	Votes	%	±%
United Australia	Charles Bennett	unopposed		
United Australia hold				

=== Gordon ===
1935 New South Wales state election: Gordon
Party	Candidate	Votes	%	±%
United Australia	Thomas Bavin	unopposed		
United Australia hold				

=== Goulburn ===
1935 New South Wales state election: Goulburn
Party	Candidate	Votes	%	±%
Labor (NSW)	Jack Tully	6,300	50.5	+5.4
United Australia	Peter Loughlin (defeated)	6,167	49.5	+13.9
Total formal votes		12,467	98.8	−0.2
Informal votes		151	1.2	+0.2
Turnout		12,618	97.6	+0.3
Labor (NSW) gain from United Australia		Swing	+4.3	

=== Granville ===
1935 New South Wales state election: Granville
Party	Candidate	Votes	%	±%
United Australia	Claude Fleck	8,990	46.2	−1.2
Labor (NSW)	Bill Ely	8,489	43.6	−1.1
Federal Labor	James Brophy	1,368	7.0	+0.2
Communist	Adam Ogston	625	3.2	+2.2
Total formal votes		19,472	97.0	−0.5
Informal votes		593	3.0	+0.5
Turnout		20,065	97.9	+0.7
Two-party-preferred result
United Australia	Claude Fleck	9,777	50.2	−2.1
Labor (NSW)	Bill Ely	9,695	49.8	+2.1
United Australia hold		Swing	−2.1	

=== Hamilton ===
1935 New South Wales state election: Hamilton
Party	Candidate	Votes	%	±%
Labor (NSW)	Joshua Arthur	9,824	48.7	−1.5
United Australia	Ernest Richardson	9,044	44.8	+44.8
Federal Labor	John Doyle	1,317	6.5	+6.5
Total formal votes		20,185	98.3	+0.6
Informal votes		351	1.7	−0.6
Turnout		20,536	96.5	−0.6
Two-party-preferred result
Labor (NSW)	Joshua Arthur	10,622	52.6	
United Australia	Ernest Richardson	9,563	47.4	
Labor (NSW) hold		Swing	N/A	

=== Hartley ===
1935 New South Wales state election: Hartley
Party	Candidate	Votes	%	±%
Labor (NSW)	Hamilton Knight	8,772	88.2	+26.0
Communist	Robert Cram	1,169	11.8	+9.4
Total formal votes		9,941	89.5	−9.2
Informal votes		1,168	10.5	+9.2
Turnout		11,109	98.0	+0.6
Labor (NSW) hold		Swing	N/A	

=== Hawkesbury ===
1935 New South Wales state election: Hawkesbury
Party	Candidate	Votes	%	±%
United Australia	Bruce Walker Jr	10,102	69.7	+17.9
Independent	Allan Cordner	4,385	30.3	+30.3
Total formal votes		14,487	97.0	−1.9
Informal votes		443	3.0	+1.9
Turnout		14,930	95.8	−0.9
United Australia hold		Swing	N/A	

=== Hornsby ===
1935 New South Wales state election: Hornsby
Party	Candidate	Votes	%	±%
United Australia	James Shand	14,464	81.3	+5.4
Centre	Fergus Munro	3,324	18.7	+18.7
Total formal votes		17,788	87.3	−11.1
Informal votes		2,586	12.7	+11.1
Turnout		20,374	95.3	−0.2
United Australia hold		Swing	N/A	

=== Hurstville ===
1935 New South Wales state election: Hurstville
Party	Candidate	Votes	%	±%
United Australia	James Webb	9,587	50.3	−1.3
Labor (NSW)	Walter Butler	8,840	46.4	+3.5
Federal Labor	Richard Bramston	616	3.2	−1.4
Total formal votes		19,043	98.2	−0.5
Informal votes		345	1.8	+0.5
Turnout		19,388	97.5	−0.4
United Australia hold		Swing	N/A	

- Preferences were not distributed.

=== Illawarra ===
1935 New South Wales state election: Illawarra
Party	Candidate	Votes	%	±%
Labor (NSW)	Billy Davies	8,086	51.4	+3.7
United Australia	Walter Duncan	6,659	42.3	−5.9
Communist	John Cranston	659	4.2	+1.8
Federal Labor	Albert Rowe	327	2.1	+0.7
Total formal votes		15,731	98.0	−0.2
Informal votes		322	2.0	+0.2
Turnout		16,053	97.6	+0.2
Labor (NSW) hold		Swing	N/A	

- Preferences were not distributed.

=== King ===
1935 New South Wales state election: King
Party	Candidate	Votes	%	±%
Labor (NSW)	Daniel Clyne	7,867	51.6	+0.6
United Australia	Geoffrey Robin	6,651	43.6	−0.1
Communist	James Prentice	723	4.7	+2.6
Total formal votes		15,241	96.8	−0.9
Informal votes		495	3.2	+0.9
Turnout		15,736	91.7	−0.9
Labor (NSW) hold		Swing	N/A	

- Preferences were not distributed.

=== Kogarah ===
1935 New South Wales state election: Kogarah
Party	Candidate	Votes	%	±%
United Australia	James Ross	10,799	53.6	+4.0
Labor (NSW)	Mark Gosling	8,155	40.5	−1.5
Federal Labor	Patrick Quinane	688	3.4	−4.0
Communist	Edward Bulmer	508	2.5	+1.6
Total formal votes		20,150	98.2	0.0
Informal votes		378	1.8	0.0
Turnout		20,528	97.6	−0.5
United Australia hold		Swing	N/A	

- Preferences were not distributed.

=== Kurri Kurri ===
1935 New South Wales state election: Kurri Kurri
Party	Candidate	Votes	%	±%
Labor (NSW)	George Booth	15,855	85.2	−3.3
Communist	Jack Miles	2,757	14.8	+3.3
Total formal votes		18,612	88.2	+5.6
Informal votes		2,353	11.2	−5.6
Turnout		20,965	96.0	−0.6
Labor (NSW) hold		Swing	−3.3	

=== Lachlan ===
1935 New South Wales state election: Lachlan
Party	Candidate	Votes	%	±%
Country	Ernest Buttenshaw	9,094	64.6	−0.2
Labor (NSW)	Valdimer Connellan	4,978	35.4	+11.2
Total formal votes		14,072	98.4	+0.2
Informal votes		225	1.6	−0.2
Turnout		14,297	94.7	−1.4
Country hold		Swing	N/A	

=== Lakemba ===
1935 New South Wales state election: Lakemba
Party	Candidate	Votes	%	±%
Labor (NSW)	Fred Stanley	10,276	56.8	+7.6
United Australia	Roland Murray	7,049	39.0	−2.8
Independent	John Stewart	753	4.2	+4.2
Total formal votes		18,078	97.9	−0.4
Informal votes		390	2.1	+0.4
Turnout		18,468	97.1	+0.6
Labor (NSW) hold		Swing	N/A	

- Preferences were not distributed.

=== Lane Cove ===
1935 New South Wales state election: Lane Cove
Party	Candidate	Votes	%	±%
United Australia	Herbert FitzSimons	14,018	83.3	+4.6
Centre	Eric Campbell	2,813	16.7	+16.7
Total formal votes		16,831	90.1	−8.5
Informal votes		1,852	9.9	+8.5
Turnout		18,683	96.3	0.0
United Australia hold		Swing	N/A	

=== Leichhardt ===
1935 New South Wales state election: Leichhardt
Party	Candidate	Votes	%	±%
Labor (NSW)	Claude Matthews	9,539	57.1	+2.6
Federal Labor	William Dyer	7,175	42.9	+35.3
Total formal votes		16,714	97.7	−0.6
Informal votes		393	2.3	+0.6
Turnout		17,107	97.6	+0.3
Labor (NSW) hold		Swing	N/A	

=== Lismore ===
1935 New South Wales state election: Lismore
Party	Candidate	Votes	%	±%
Country	William Frith	unopposed		
Country hold				

=== Liverpool Plains ===
1935 New South Wales state election: Liverpool Plains
Party	Candidate	Votes	%	±%
Country	Harry Carter	7,590	61.1	−5.2
Labor (NSW)	Percy Forsyth	4,835	38.9	+5.2
Total formal votes		12,425	98.6	+0.2
Informal votes		181	1.4	−0.2
Turnout		12,606	95.8	−0.6
Country hold		Swing	−5.2	

=== Maitland ===
1935 New South Wales state election: Maitland
Party	Candidate	Votes	%	±%
United Australia	Walter Howarth	7,262	57.3	+18.1
Labor (NSW)	Walter O'Hearn	5,420	42.7	+3.0
Total formal votes		12,682	98.6	0.0
Informal votes		182	1.4	0.0
Turnout		12,864	98.1	+0.2
United Australia hold		Swing	−1.2	

=== Manly ===
1935 New South Wales state election: Manly
Party	Candidate	Votes	%	±%
United Australia	Alfred Reid	14,167	73.8	−2.7
Ind. United Australia	Ernest Kidd	5,023	26.2	+26.2
Total formal votes		19,190	90.7	−6.7
Informal votes		1,956	9.3	+6.7
Turnout		21,146	95.3	−1.3
United Australia hold		Swing	N/A	

=== Marrickville ===
1935 New South Wales state election: Marrickville
Party	Candidate	Votes	%	±%
Labor (NSW)	Carlo Lazzarini	9,948	55.2	+7.8
United Australia	Herbert Donald	8,063	44.8	+3.8
Total formal votes		18,011	98.8	+1.0
Informal votes		218	1.2	−1.0
Turnout		18,229	97.5	+0.3
Labor (NSW) hold		Swing	+3.9	

=== Monaro ===
1935 New South Wales state election: Monaro
Party	Candidate	Votes	%	±%
Country	William Hedges	7,306	56.9	−0.6
Labor (NSW)	Clarence Moore	5,526	43.1	+10.8
Total formal votes		12,832	98.7	+1.5
Informal votes		165	1.3	−1.5
Turnout		12,997	97.1	−0.7
Country hold		Swing	N/A	

=== Mosman ===
1935 New South Wales state election: Mosman
Party	Candidate	Votes	%	±%
United Australia	Herbert Lloyd	unopposed		
United Australia hold				

=== Mudgee ===
1935 New South Wales state election: Mudgee
Party	Candidate	Votes	%	±%
Labor (NSW)	Bill Dunn (defeated)	7,598	52.7	+5.5
Country	David Spring	6,818	47.3	−5.2
Total formal votes		14,416	99.4	+0.3
Informal votes		91	0.6	−0.3
Turnout		14,507	97.4	+0.5
Labor (NSW) gain from Country		Swing	N/A	

=== Murray ===
1935 New South Wales state election: Murray
Party	Candidate	Votes	%	±%
Country	Joe Lawson	6,510	51.0	+4.6
Labor (NSW)	John Donovan	6,263	49.0	+8.4
Total formal votes		12,773	98.6	+0.7
Informal votes		175	1.4	−0.7
Turnout		12,948	90.4	−3.3
Country hold		Swing	−6.2	

=== Murrumbidgee ===
1935 New South Wales state election: Murrumbidgee
Party	Candidate	Votes	%	±%
Country	Robert Hankinson	7,617	52.3	+11.0
Labor (NSW)	George Enticknap	6,941	47.7	+6.0
Total formal votes		14,558	98.2	+0.1
Informal votes		261	1.8	−0.1
Turnout		14,819	94.8	−2.3
Country hold		Swing	−4.0	

=== Namoi ===
1935 New South Wales state election: Namoi
Party	Candidate	Votes	%	±%
Country	Colin Sinclair	7,404	52.6	−3.7
Labor (NSW)	William Scully	6,678	47.4	+3.7
Total formal votes		14,082	98.6	−0.4
Informal votes		194	1.4	+0.4
Turnout		14,276	95.4	−0.9
Country hold		Swing	N/A	

=== Nepean ===
1935 New South Wales state election: Nepean
Party	Candidate	Votes	%	±%
United Australia	Joseph Jackson	10,085	65.6	−20.3
Labor (NSW)	John Jackson	5,292	34.4	+34.4
Total formal votes		15,377	97.8	+6.5
Informal votes		340	2.2	−6.5
Turnout		15,717	94.9	−0.4
United Australia hold		Swing	N/A	

=== Neutral Bay ===
1935 New South Wales state election: Neutral Bay
Party	Candidate	Votes	%	±%
United Australia	Reginald Weaver	13,937	88.4	+7.7
Independent	Peter Pollack	1,825	11.6	+11.6
Total formal votes		15,762	93.5	−4.8
Informal votes		1,092	6.5	+4.8
Turnout		16,854	94.2	−2.4
United Australia hold		Swing	N/A	

=== Newcastle ===
1935 New South Wales state election: Newcastle
Party	Candidate	Votes	%	±%
Labor (NSW)	Frank Hawkins	9,640	51.6	−1.3
Independent Labor	Hugh Sutherland	3,774	20.2	+20.2
Federal Labor	William Nye	3,652	19.5	+13.5
Communist	Frederick Dodd	1,624	8.7	+6.7
Total formal votes		18,690	95.6	−1.8
Informal votes		854	4.4	+1.8
Turnout		19,544	96.1	−0.9
Labor (NSW) hold		Swing	N/A	

- Preferences were not distributed.

=== Newtown ===
1935 New South Wales state election: Newtown
Party	Candidate	Votes	%	±%
Labor (NSW)	Frank Burke	11,042	67.5	+0.3
Federal Labor	Joseph Bugler	5,318	32.5	+30.0
Total formal votes		16,360	97.1	0.0
Informal votes		490	2.9	0.0
Turnout		16,850	96.9	0.0
Labor (NSW) hold		Swing	N/A	

- Preferences were not distributed.

=== North Sydney ===
1935 New South Wales state election: North Sydney
Party	Candidate	Votes	%	±%
United Australia	Hubert Primrose	9,773	55.6	−3.0
Labor (NSW)	Ben Howe	6,518	37.1	+1.4
Ind. United Australia	Leslie Dare	736	4.2	+4.2
Federal Labor	Thomas Lavelle	537	3.1	−0.1
Total formal votes		17,564	97.5	−0.4
Informal votes		448	2.5	+0.4
Turnout		18,012	96.4	+0.1
United Australia hold		Swing	N/A	

- Preferences were not distributed.

=== Orange ===
1935 New South Wales state election: Orange
Party	Candidate	Votes	%	±%
United Australia	Alwyn Tonking	7,628	54.0	+22.4
Federal Labor	William Folster	6,493	46.0	+6.6
Total formal votes		14,121	98.3	−0.6
Informal votes		247	1.7	+0.6
Turnout		14,368	96.8	−0.1
United Australia hold		Swing	−4.4	

=== Oxley ===
1935 New South Wales state election: Oxley
Party	Candidate	Votes	%	±%
United Australia	Lewis Martin	10,192	70.5	−6.7
Labor (NSW)	Francis Hartley	4,269	29.5	+6.7
Total formal votes		14,461	98.3	+0.3
Turnout		14,703	96.2	−0.4
United Australia hold		Swing	+6.7	

=== Paddington ===
1935 New South Wales state election: Paddington
Party	Candidate	Votes	%	±%
Labor (NSW)	Maurice O'Sullivan	10,470	66.5	+8.5
Federal Labor	Leslie Kirkwood	3,931	25.0	+21.1
Communist	George Gowland	1,352	8.6	+6.6
Total formal votes		15,753	96.1	−0.4
Informal votes		635	3.9	+0.4
Turnout		16,388	93.4	−3.1
Labor (NSW) hold		Swing	N/A	

- Preferences were not distributed.

=== Parramatta ===
1935 New South Wales state election: Parramatta
Party	Candidate	Votes	%	±%
United Australia	George Gollan	11,854	58.3	+3.3
Labor (NSW)	Joseph Byrne	7,928	39.0	+1.8
Communist	William Beck	546	2.7	+1.7
Total formal votes		20,328	98.3	+1.8
Informal votes		358	1.7	−1.8
Turnout		20,686	96.5	−1.2
United Australia hold		Swing	N/A	

- Preferences were not distributed.

=== Petersham ===
1935 New South Wales state election: Petersham
Party	Candidate	Votes	%	±%
United Australia	Eric Solomon	8,701	49.1	−0.3
Labor (NSW)	Bill Sheahan	7,995	45.1	+1.8
Federal Labor	Patrick Colbourne	749	4.2	−2.9
Independent	Jervis Blackman	286	1.6	+1.6
Total formal votes		17,731	98.1	−0.5
Informal votes		341	1.9	+0.5
Turnout		18,072	95.9	−0.2
Two-party-preferred result
United Australia	Eric Solomon	9,178	51.8	−1.7
Labor (NSW)	Patrick Colbourne	8,553	48.2	+1.7
United Australia hold		Swing	−1.7	

=== Phillip ===
1935 New South Wales state election: Phillip
Party	Candidate	Votes	%	±%
Labor (NSW)	Tom Shannon	unopposed		
Labor (NSW) hold				

=== Raleigh ===
1935 New South Wales state election: Raleigh
Party	Candidate	Votes	%	±%
Country	Roy Vincent	8,719	57.5	−19.6
Independent	Arthur Wallace	6,435	42.5	+42.5
Total formal votes		15,154	98.3	0.0
Informal votes		268	1.7	0.0
Turnout		15,422	96.0	−0.3
Country hold		Swing	N/A	

=== Randwick ===
1935 New South Wales state election: Randwick
Party	Candidate	Votes	%	±%
United Australia	Arthur Moverly	9,892	52.9	+0.5
Labor (NSW)	Jack Flanagan	8,029	43.0	+1.1
Federal Labor	John Taylor	772	4.1	−1.6
Total formal votes		18,693	98.4	−0.6
Informal votes		296	1.6	+0.6
Turnout		18,989	96.7	+0.7
United Australia hold		Swing	N/A	

- Preferences were not distributed.

=== Redfern ===
1935 New South Wales state election: Redfern
Party	Candidate	Votes	%	±%
Labor (NSW)	William McKell	13,981	91.1	+17.7
Communist	Robert McWilliams	1,373	8.9	+7.9
Total formal votes		15,354	92.2	−5.9
Informal votes		1,295	7.8	+5.9
Turnout		16,649	96.0	−0.2
Labor (NSW) hold		Swing	N/A	

=== Ryde ===
1935 New South Wales state election: Ryde
Party	Candidate	Votes	%	±%
United Australia	Eric Spooner	11,983	59.3	+2.3
Labor (NSW)	Evan Davies	8,208	40.7	+3.5
Total formal votes		20,191	98.1	−0.4
Informal votes		395	1.9	+0.4
Turnout		20,586	97.5	+0.1
United Australia hold		Swing	N/A	

=== South Coast ===
1935 New South Wales state election: South Coast
Party	Candidate	Votes	%	±%
United Australia	Henry Bate	9,142	64.7	−10.2
Labor (NSW)	Reginald Murphy	3,379	23.9	−1.2
Independent	Herb Turner	1,608	11.4	+11.4
Total formal votes		14,129	98.1	−0.5
Informal votes		267	1.9	+0.5
Turnout		14,396	95.8	−0.7
United Australia hold		Swing	N/A	

- Preferences were not distributed.

=== Sturt ===
1935 New South Wales state election: Sturt
Party	Candidate	Votes	%	±%
Labor (NSW)	Ted Horsington	8,924	88.0	−5.2
Independent	Stuart Coombe	1,213	12.0	+12.0
Total formal votes		10,137	90.4	+7.0
Informal votes		1,070	9.6	−7.0
Turnout		11,207	92.5	−2.1
Labor (NSW) hold		Swing	N/A	

=== Tamworth ===
1935 New South Wales state election: Tamworth
Party	Candidate	Votes	%	±%
United Australia	Frank Chaffey	5,879	44.3	−16.6
Labor (NSW)	William McArdle	3,469	26.2	+1.0
Independent	William McKnight	2,096	15.8	+15.8
Independent	James Brownhill	1,221	9.2	−3.9
Independent	John Killalea	602	4.5	+4.5
Total formal votes		13,267	97.9	−0.5
Informal votes		283	2.1	+0.5
Turnout		13,550	96.0	−0.9
Two-party-preferred result
United Australia	Frank Chaffey	8,258	62.2	
Labor (NSW)	William McArdle	5,009	37.8	
United Australia hold		Swing	N/A	

=== Temora ===
1935 New South Wales state election: Temora
Party	Candidate	Votes	%	±%
Country	Hugh Main	7,290	59.3	−1.9
Labor (NSW)	Edward O'Neill	5,004	40.7	+4.7
Total formal votes		12,294	98.3	−0.2
Informal votes		212	1.7	+0.2
Turnout		12,506	95.9	−1.1
Country hold		Swing	N/A	

=== Tenterfield ===
1935 New South Wales state election: Tenterfield
Party	Candidate	Votes	%	±%
Country	Michael Bruxner	unopposed		
Country hold				

=== Upper Hunter ===
1935 New South Wales state election: Upper Hunter
Party	Candidate	Votes	%	±%
Country	Malcolm Brown	7,573	54.0	−2.4
Labor (NSW)	John Wood	4,274	30.5	+4.0
Ind. United Australia	William Chapman	2,178	15.5	+15.5
Total formal votes		14,025	98.5	−0.2
Informal votes		211	1.5	+0.2
Turnout		14,236	96.0	−0.3
Country hold		Swing	N/A	

- Preferences were not distributed.

=== Vaucluse ===
1935 New South Wales state election: Vaucluse
Party	Candidate	Votes	%	±%
United Australia	William Foster	unopposed		
United Australia hold				

=== Wagga Wagga ===
1935 New South Wales state election: Wagga Wagga
Party	Candidate	Votes	%	±%
Country	Matthew Kilpatrick	7,876	63.5	−4.1
Labor (NSW)	Ray Maher	4,529	36.5	+4.1
Total formal votes		12,405	98.7	+0.8
Informal votes		158	1.3	−0.8
Turnout		12,563	95.8	−1.9
Country hold		Swing	−4.1	

=== Waratah ===
1935 New South Wales state election: Waratah
Party	Candidate	Votes	%	±%
Labor (NSW)	Robert Cameron	11,451	58.8	+9.9
Federal Labor	Roy McIlveen	6,390	32.8	+22.5
Communist	Douglas Gillies	1,625	8.4	+6.7
Total formal votes		19,466	96.5	−1.4
Informal votes		712	3.5	+1.4
Turnout		20,178	96.8	−1.0
Labor (NSW) hold		Swing	N/A	

- Preferences were not distributed.

=== Waverley ===
1935 New South Wales state election: Waverley
Party	Candidate	Votes	%	±%
United Australia	John Waddell	9,344	50.2	−2.1
Labor (NSW)	William Clementson	8,545	45.9	+3.7
Federal Labor	Alexander Hogan	732	3.9	−1.0
Total formal votes		18,621	98.3	−0.4
Informal votes		314	1.7	+0.4
Turnout		18,935	95.8	0.0
United Australia hold		Swing	N/A	

- Preferences were not distributed.

=== Willoughby ===
1935 New South Wales state election: Willoughby
Party	Candidate	Votes	%	±%
United Australia	Edward Sanders	11,865	69.0	−2.3
Labor (NSW)	David Rees	5,327	31.0	+2.3
Total formal votes		17,192	98.4	−0.6
Informal votes		278	1.6	+0.6
Turnout		17,470	97.4	+0.3
United Australia hold		Swing	+2.3	

=== Wollondilly ===
1935 New South Wales state election: Wollondilly
Party	Candidate	Votes	%	±%
United Australia	Mark Morton	unopposed		
United Australia hold				

=== Woollahra ===
1935 New South Wales state election: Woollahra
Party	Candidate	Votes	%	±%
United Australia	Daniel Levy	11,900	71.9	−3.6
Independent	Rupert Beale	4,660	28.1	+28.1
Total formal votes		16,560	96.8	−1.5
Informal votes		555	3.2	+1.5
Turnout		17,115	91.2	−1.8
United Australia hold		Swing	N/A	

=== Yass ===
1935 New South Wales state election: Yass
Party	Candidate	Votes	%	±%
United Australia	George Ardill	7,206	57.8	−4.1
Labor (NSW)	John Cleary	5,263	42.2	+4.1
Total formal votes		12,469	98.6	+0.2
Informal votes		180	1.4	−0.2
Turnout		12,649	97.1	−0.2
United Australia hold		Swing	−4.1	

=== Young ===
1935 New South Wales state election: Young
Party	Candidate	Votes	%	±%
Country	Albert Reid	7,480	53.7	+5.0
Labor (NSW)	Stanley Neagle	6,460	46.3	+6.2
Total formal votes		13,940	98.7	+0.2
Informal votes		190	1.3	−0.2
Turnout		14,130	96.6	−0.2
Country hold		Swing	−5.5	

== See also ==
- Candidates of the 1935 New South Wales state election
- Members of the New South Wales Legislative Assembly, 1935–1938
