= Candidates of the 1935 New South Wales state election =

This is a list of candidates for the 1935 New South Wales state election. The election was held on 11 May 1935.

== Retiring members ==
=== Labor ===
- William Brennan (Hamilton)
- Peter Connolly (Newcastle) — lost party endorsement
- Tom Keegan (Glebe)

=== United Australia ===
- Sir Thomas Henley (Burwood)

== Legislative Assembly ==
Sitting members are shown in bold text. Successful candidates are highlighted in the relevant colour.

Electorate	Held by	Labor candidate	Coalition candidate	Fed. Labor candidate	Other candidates
Albury	United Australia	Edward Jones	**Alexander Mair** (UAP)		
Annandale	Labor	**Bob Gorman**		John Keegan	
Armidale	Country		**David Drummond** (CP)		
Arncliffe	United Australia	Joseph Cahill	**Horace Harper** (UAP)	Northey Du Maurier	Enoch Jones (CM); William Yewdall (Ind)
Ashburnham	Country	William Keast	**Hilton Elliott** (CP)		
Ashfield	United Australia	Robert Bruce	Athol Richardson (UAP)		**Milton Jarvie** (Ind UAP)
Auburn	Labor	**Jack Lang**		Ben Chifley	
Balmain	Labor	**John Quirk**		Allan Howie	Lance Sharkey (CPA)
Bankstown	Labor	**James McGirr**	Julian De Meyrick (UAP)		Frederick Loveday (CPA)
Barwon	Country	John O'Connor	**Ben Wade** (CP)		
Bathurst	Country	Gus Kelly	**Gordon Wilkins** (CP)	Martin Griffin	
Bondi	United Australia	Jack Fitzpatrick	**Norman Thomas** (UAP)		
Botany	Labor	**Bob Heffron**			
Bulli	Labor	**John Sweeney**			Patrick McHenry (CPA)
Burwood	United Australia	Arthur Dowd	Gordon Jackett (UAP)		George Bland (Ind)
Byron	Country	John Rogan	**Arthur Budd** (CP)		Frederick Stuart (Ind)
Canterbury	United Australia	Arthur Tonge	**Edward Hocking** (UAP)	Albert Gardiner	
Casino	Country	Leonard Sweeney	**John Reid** (CP)		
Castlereagh	Country	Joseph Clark	**Alfred Yeo** (CP)		
Cessnock	Labor	**Jack Baddeley**			Charles Evans (CPA); Eugene O'Neill (Ind)
Clarence	Country		**Alfred Henry** (CP)		William Robinson (Ind)
Clarence	Country		Bertie Eggins (CP)		William Robinson (Ind)
Cobar	Labor	**Mat Davidson**		Joseph Bowe	
Concord	United Australia	Alan McNamara	**Stan Lloyd** (UAP)	Henry McDicken	Aubrey Murphy (CM)
Coogee	United Australia	Karl Guhl	**John Dunningham** (UAP)		
Cootamundra	Country	Ken Hoad	**Bill Ross** (CP)		
Corowa	Country		**Richard Ball** (CP)		
Croydon	United Australia	Archibald Pattinson	**Bertram Stevens** (UAP)		Harold Bondeson (SC)
Drummoyne	United Australia	Michael Croot	**John Lee** (UAP)		
Dubbo	Country	Alfred McClelland	**George Wilson** (CP)		
Dulwich Hill	United Australia	Frank Connors	**John Ness** (UAP)		
George's River	United Australia	Ted Kinsella	**Cecil Monro** (UAP)		James Fowler (CM)
Glebe	Labor	Bill Carlton			Tom Dowling (CPA); Bertie Lewis (Ind); Henry Wood (Ind)
Gloucester	United Australia		**Charles Bennett** (UAP)		
Gordon	United Australia		**Sir Thomas Bavin** (UAP)		
Goulburn	United Australia	Jack Tully	**Peter Loughlin** (UAP)		
Granville	United Australia	Bill Ely	**Claude Fleck** (UAP)	James Brophy	Adam Ogston (CPA)
Hamilton	Labor	Joshua Arthur	Ernest Richardson (UAP)	John Doyle	
Hartley	Labor	**Hamilton Knight**			Robert Cram (CPA)
Hawkesbury	United Australia		**Bruce Walker Jr** (UAP)		Allan Cordner (Ind)
Hornsby	United Australia		**James Shand** (UAP)		Fergus Munro (CM)
Hurstville	United Australia	Walter Butler	**James Webb** (UAP)	Richard Bramston	
Illawarra	Labor	**Billy Davies**	Walter Duncan (UAP)	Albert Rowe	John Cranston (CPA)
King	Labor	**Daniel Clyne**	Geoffrey Robin (UAP)		James Prentice (CPA)
Kogarah	United Australia	Mark Gosling	**James Ross** (UAP)	Patrick Quinane	Edward Bulmer (CPA)
Kurri Kurri	Labor	**George Booth**			Jack Miles (CPA)
Lachlan	Country	Valdimer Connellan	**Ernest Buttenshaw** (CP)		
Lakemba	Labor	**Fred Stanley**	Roland Murray (UAP)		John Stewart (Ind)
Lane Cove	United Australia		**Herbert FitzSimons** (UAP)		Eric Campbell (CM)
Leichhardt	Labor	**Claude Matthews**		William Dyer	
Lismore	Country		**William Frith** (CP)		
Liverpool Plains	Country	Percy Forsyth	**Harry Carter** (CP)		
Maitland	United Australia	Walter O'Hearn	**Walter Howarth** (UAP)		
Manly	United Australia		**Alfred Reid** (UAP)		Ernest Kidd (Ind UAP)
Marrickville	Labor	**Carlo Lazzarini**	Herbert Donald (UAP)		
Monaro	Country	Clarence Moore	**William Hedges** (CP)		
Mosman	United Australia		**Herbert Lloyd** (UAP)		
Mudgee	Country	Bill Dunn	**David Spring** (CP)		
Murray	Country	John Donovan	**Joe Lawson** (CP)		
Murrumbidgee	Country	George Enticknap	**Robert Hankinson** (CP)		
Namoi	Country	William Scully	**Colin Sinclair** (CP)		
Nepean	United Australia	John Jackson	**Joseph Jackson** (UAP)		
Neutral Bay	United Australia		**Reginald Weaver** (UAP)		Peter Pollack (Ind)
Newcastle	Labor	Frank Hawkins		William Nye	Frederick Dodd (CPA); Hugh Sutherland (Ind Lab)
Newtown	Labor	**Frank Burke**		Joseph Bugler	
North Sydney	United Australia	Ben Howe	**Hubert Primrose** (UAP)	Thomas Lavelle	Leslie Dare (Ind UAP)
Orange	United Australia	William Folster	**Alwyn Tonking** (UAP)		
Oxley	United Australia	Francis Hartley	**Lewis Martin** (UAP)		
Paddington	Labor	**Maurice O'Sullivan**		Leslie Kirkwood	George Gowland (CPA)
Parramatta	United Australia	Joseph Byrne	**George Gollan** (UAP)		William Beck (CPA)
Petersham	United Australia	Bill Sheahan	**Eric Solomon** (UAP)	Patrick Colbourne	Jervis Blackman (Ind)
Phillip	Labor	**Tom Shannon**			
Raleigh	Country		**Roy Vincent** (CP)		Arthur Wallace (Ind)
Randwick	United Australia	Jack Flanagan	**Arthur Moverly** (UAP)	John Taylor	
Redfern	Labor	**William McKell**			Robert McWilliams (CPA)
Ryde	United Australia	Evan Davies	**Eric Spooner** (UAP)		
South Coast	United Australia	Reginald Murphy	**Henry Bate** (UAP)		Herb Turner (Ind)
Sturt	Labor	**Ted Horsington**			Stuart Coombe (Ind)
Tamworth	United Australia	William McArdle	**Frank Chaffey** (UAP)		James Brownhill (Ind); John Killalea (Ind); William McKnight (Ind)
Temora	Country	Edward O'Neill	**Hugh Main** (CP)		
Tenterfield	Country		**Michael Bruxner** (CP)		
Upper Hunter	Country	John Wood	**Malcolm Brown** (CP)		William Chapman (Ind UAP)
Vaucluse	United Australia		**William Foster** (UAP)		
Wagga Wagga	Country	Ray Maher	**Matthew Kilpatrick** (CP)		
Waratah	Labor	**Robert Cameron**		Roy McIlveen	Douglas Gillies (CPA)
Waverley	United Australia	William Clementson	**John Waddell** (UAP)	Alex Hogan	
Willoughby	United Australia	David Rees	**Edward Sanders** (UAP)		
Wollondilly	United Australia		**Mark Morton** (UAP)		
Woollahra	United Australia		**Sir Daniel Levy** (UAP)		Rupert Beale (Ind)
Yass	United Australia	John Cleary	**George Ardill** (UAP)		
Young	Country	Stanley Neagle	**Albert Reid** (CP)		

== See also ==
- Members of the New South Wales Legislative Assembly, 1935–1938
