= Electoral results for the district of Middle Harbour =

Election results for Middle Harbour, New South Wales, Australia

Middle Harbour, an electoral district of the Legislative Assembly in the Australian state of New South Wales had two incarnations, from 1904 to 1920 and from 1988 to 1991.

Election	Member	Party
1904	Richard Arthur	Liberal Reform
1907	Richard Arthur	Liberal Reform
1910	Richard Arthur	Liberal Reform
1913	Richard Arthur	Liberal Reform
1917	Richard Arthur	Nationalist
Member	Party	Term
1988	Peter Collins	Liberal

== Election results ==
=== Elections in the 1980s ===
==== 1988 ====
1988 New South Wales state election: Middle Harbour
Party	Candidate	Votes	%	±%
Liberal	Peter Collins	20,147	71.2	+5.2
Labor	Marilyn Dodkin	8,161	28.8	−1.1
Total formal votes		28,308	96.4	−1.4
Informal votes		1,061	3.6	+1.4
Turnout		29,369	93.4	
Liberal notional hold		Swing	+3.2	

District recreated

==== 1920 - 1988 ====
District abolished

=== Elections in the 1910s ===
==== 1917 ====
1917 New South Wales state election: Middle Harbour
Party	Candidate	Votes	%	±%
Nationalist	Richard Arthur	5,106	59.5	−5.1
Independent	Alfred Reid	1,904	22.2	+22.2
Independent	Arthur Keirle	1,568	18.3	+18.3
Total formal votes		8,578	98.8	+1.0
Informal votes		107	1.2	−1.0
Turnout		8,685	53.9	−13.2
Nationalist hold		Swing	−5.1	

==== 1913 ====
1913 New South Wales state election: Middle Harbour
Party	Candidate	Votes	%	±%
Liberal Reform	Richard Arthur	5,785	64.6	
Labor	Ellison Quirk	3,068	34.3	
Independent	James Bray	76	0.9	
Independent	Henry Johnson	29	0.3	
Total formal votes		8,958	97.8	
Informal votes		205	2.2	
Turnout		9,163	67.1	
Liberal Reform hold				

==== 1910 ====
1910 New South Wales state election: Middle Harbour
Party	Candidate	Votes	%	±%
Liberal Reform	Richard Arthur	7,554	68.7	
Labour	Stephen O'Brien	2,793	25.4	
Independent Liberal	David Middleton	647	5.9	
Total formal votes		10,994	98.7	
Informal votes		150	1.3	
Turnout		11,144	68.2	
Liberal Reform hold				

=== Elections in the 1900s ===
==== 1907 ====
1907 New South Wales state election: Middle Harbour
Party	Candidate	Votes	%	±%
Liberal Reform	Richard Arthur	5,120	57.2	
Independent Liberal	William Fell	3,674	41.0	
Independent	Thomas Loxton	92	1.0	
Independent	John Hayes	70	0.8	
Total formal votes		8,956	98.0	
Informal votes		183	2.0	
Turnout		9,139	75.9	
Liberal Reform hold				

==== 1904 ====
1904 New South Wales state election: Middle Harbour
Party	Candidate	Votes	%	±%
Liberal Reform	Richard Arthur	3,137	58.2	
Ind. Progressive	Ellison Quirk	2,207	41.0	
Socialist Labor	William Gocher	33	0.6	
Independent	Edgar Vanhee	13	0.2	
Total formal votes		5,390	99.3	
Informal votes		37	0.7	
Turnout		5,427	60.5	
Liberal Reform win		(new seat)		

Middle Harbour was a new seat and consisted of part of the abolished seat of Warringah and the balance of Warringah was included in St Leonards. The member for Warringah was Ellison Quirk (Independent).
