= Members of the New South Wales Legislative Assembly, 1935–1938 =

Members of the New South Wales Legislative Assembly who served in the 31st parliament held their seats from 1935 to 1938. They were elected at the 1935 state election, and at by-elections. The Speaker was Sir Daniel Levy until his death in 1937 and then Reginald Weaver.

Name	Party	Electorate	Term in office
George Ardill	United Australia	Yass	1930–1941
Joshua Arthur	Labor	Hamilton	1935–1953
Jack Baddeley	Labor	Cessnock	1922–1949
Richard Ball (Note: Corowa Country MLA Richard Ball died on 30 October 1937. Independent candidate Christopher Lethbridge won the resulting by-election on 11 December.)	Country	Corowa	1895–1898, 1904–1937
Henry Bate	United Australia	South Coast	1926–1941
Thomas Bavin (Note: Gordon UAP MLA Thomas Bavin retired to take an appointment as a judge of the Supreme Court of New South Wales. UAP candidate Philip Goldfinch won the resulting by-election on 23 November (unopposed).)	United Australia	Gordon	1917–1935
Charles Bennett	United Australia	Gloucester	1934–1941
George Booth	Labor	Kurri Kurri	1925–1960
Malcolm Brown	Country	Upper Hunter	1931–1939
Michael Bruxner	Country	Tenterfield	1920–1962
Arthur Budd	Country	Byron	1927–1944
Frank Burke	Labor	Newtown	1917–1944
Ernest Buttenshaw	Country	Lachlan	1917–1938
Joseph Cahill	Labor	Arncliffe	1925–1959
Robert Cameron	Labor	Waratah	1927–1956
Bill Carlton	Labor	Glebe	1935–1941
Harry Carter	Country	Liverpool Plains	1927–1941
Frank Chaffey	United Australia	Tamworth	1913–1940
Daniel Clyne	Labor	King	1927–1956
Mat Davidson	Labor	Cobar	1918–1949
Billy Davies	Labor	Illawarra	1917–1949
David Drummond	Country	Armidale	1920–1949
Bill Dunn	Labor	Mudgee	1910–1911, 1911–1932, 1935–1950
John Dunningham	United Australia	Coogee	1928–1938
Hilton Elliott	Country	Ashburnham	1932–1941
Herbert FitzSimons	United Australia	Lane Cove	1930–1944
Claude Fleck	United Australia	Granville	1932–1938
William Foster (Note: Vaucluse UAP MLA William Foster died on 21 July 1936. Independent UAP candidate Murray Robson won the resulting by-election on 29 August.)	United Australia	Vaucluse	1925–1936
William Frith	Country	Lismore	1933–1953
Sir Philip Goldfinch (Note: Gordon MLA Philip Goldfinch resigned on 5 July 1937 citing a heavy commitment to business interests. Independent UAP candidate Harry Turner won the resulting by-election on 7 August 1937.)	United Australia	Gordon	1935–1937
George Gollan	United Australia	Parramatta	1932–1953
Bob Gorman	Labor	Annandale	1933–1950
Robert Hankinson	Country	Murrumbidgee	1932–1941
Frank Hawkins	Labor	Newcastle	1935–1968
William Hedges	Country	Monaro	1927–1941
Bob Heffron (Note: Bob Heffron (Botany) and Carlo Lazzarini (Marrickville) were expelled from the Labor Party in August 1936 and formed the Industrial Labor Party.)	Labor/Industrial Labor	Botany	1930–1968
Alfred Henry	Country	Clarence	1931–1938
Ted Horsington	Labor	Sturt	1922–1947
Walter Howarth	United Australia	Maitland	1932–1956
Gordon Jackett	United Australia	Burwood	1935–1951
Joseph Jackson	United Australia	Nepean	1922–1956
Matthew Kilpatrick	Country	Wagga Wagga	1920–1941
Gus Kelly	Labor	Bathurst	1925–1932, 1935–1967
Hamilton Knight	Labor	Hartley	1927–1947
Jack Lang	Labor	Auburn	1913–1943, 1943–1946
Joe Lawson	Country	Murray	1932–1973
Carlo Lazzarini	Labor/Industrial Labor	Marrickville	1917–1952
John Lee	United Australia	Drummoyne	1920–1941
Christopher Lethbridge	Independent	Corowa	1937–1946
Sir Daniel Levy (Note: The Speaker Sir Daniel Levy (Woollahra) died on 20 May 1937. Independent UAP candidate Harold Mason won the resulting by-election on 26 June.)	United Australia	Woollahra	1901–1937
Herbert Lloyd	United Australia	Mosman	1929–1941
Stan Lloyd	United Australia	Concord	1932–1941
Hugh Main	Country	Temora	1922–1938
Alexander Mair	United Australia	Albury	1932–1946
Harold Mason	Ind. United Australia	Woollahra	1937–1938
Claude Matthews	Labor	Leichhardt	1934–1954
James McGirr	Labor	Bankstown	1922–1952
William McKell	Labor	Redfern	1917–1947
Lewis Martin	United Australia	Oxley	1927–1941
Cecil Monro	United Australia	Georges River	1932–1941, 1950–1953
Mark Morton	United Australia	Wollondilly	1901–1920, 1922–1938
Arthur Moverly	United Australia	Randwick	1932–1941
John Ness	United Australia	Dulwich Hill	1927–1938
Maurice O'Sullivan	Labor	Paddington	1927–1959
Hubert Primrose	United Australia	North Sydney	1932–1941
John Quirk	Labor	Balmain	1917–1938
Albert Reid	Country	Young	1927–1930, 1932–1941
Alfred Reid	United Australia	Manly	1920–1922, 1925–1945
John Reid	Country	Casino	1930–1953
Athol Richardson	United Australia	Ashfield	1935–1946, 1946–1952
Murray Robson	Ind. United Australia	Vaucluse	1936–1957
Bill Ross	Country	Cootamundra	1932–1941
James Ross	United Australia	Kogarah	1932–1941
Edward Sanders	United Australia	Willoughby	1925–1943
James Shand	United Australia	Hornsby	1926–1944
Tom Shannon	Labor	Phillip	1927–1954
Colin Sinclair	Country	Namoi	1932–1941
Eric Solomon	United Australia	Petersham	1932–1941
Eric Spooner	United Australia	Ryde	1932–40
Fred Stanley	Labor	Lakemba	1927–1950
Bertram Stevens	United Australia	Croydon	1927–1940
John Sweeney	Labor	Bulli	1933–1947
Norman Thomas	United Australia	Bondi	1932–1941
Arthur Tonge	Labor	Canterbury	1926–1932, 1935–1962
Alwyn Tonking	United Australia	Orange	1932–1944
Jack Tully	Labor	Goulburn	1925–1932, 1935–1946
Harry Turner	United Australia	Gordon	1937–1952
Roy Vincent	Country	Raleigh	1922–1953
John Waddell	United Australia	Waverley	1932–1939
Ben Wade	Country	Barwon	1932–1940
Bruce Walker Jr	United Australia	Hawkesbury	1932–1941
Reginald Weaver	United Australia	Neutral Bay	1917–1925, 1927–1945
James Webb	United Australia	Hurstville	1932–1939
George Wilson	Country	Dubbo	1932–1942
Alfred Yeo	Country	Castlereagh	1932–1941

== See also ==
- Second Stevens ministry
- Results of the 1935 New South Wales state election
- Candidates of the 1935 New South Wales state election
