= Electoral results for the district of Arncliffe =

Election results for Arncliffe, New South Wales, Australia

Arncliffe, an electoral district of the Legislative Assembly in the Australian state of New South Wales, was created in 1930 and abolished in 1941.

Election	Member	Party
1930	Joseph Cahill	Labor
1932	Horace Harper	United Australia
1935	Joseph Cahill	Labor (NSW)
1938	Joseph Cahill	Labor

== Election results ==
=== Elections in the 1930s ===
==== 1938 ====
1938 New South Wales state election: Arncliffe
Party	Candidate	Votes	%	±%
Labor	Joseph Cahill	9,885	51.9	+5.8
United Australia	Ernest Barton	9,156	48.1	+4.2
Total formal votes		19,041	98.5	+1.0
Informal votes		297	1.5	−1.0
Turnout		19,338	97.2	−0.4
Labor hold		Swing	+0.3	

==== 1935 ====
1935 New South Wales state election: Arncliffe
Party	Candidate	Votes	%	±%
Labor (NSW)	Joseph Cahill	8,438	46.1	+0.5
United Australia	Horace Harper	8,036	43.9	−4.4
Federal Labor	Northey Du Maurier	959	5.2	0.0
Independent	William Yewdall	666	3.6	+3.6
Centre	Enoch Jones	199	1.1	+1.1
Total formal votes		18,298	97.5	−1.0
Informal votes		471	2.5	+1.0
Turnout		18,769	97.6	0.0
Two-party-preferred result
Labor (NSW)	Joseph Cahill	9,439	51.6	+3.1
United Australia	Horace Harper	8,859	48.4	−3.1
Labor (NSW) gain from United Australia		Swing	+3.1	

==== 1932 ====
1932 New South Wales state election: Arncliffe
Party	Candidate	Votes	%	±%
United Australia	Horace Harper	8,692	48.3	+15.7
Labor (NSW)	Joseph Cahill	8,208	45.6	−20.7
Federal Labor	Patrick Coyne	932	5.2	+5.2
Communist	Frederick Farrall	173	1.0	−0.2
Total formal votes		18,005	98.5	+0.6
Informal votes		282	1.5	−0.6
Turnout		18,287	97.6	+2.2
Two-party-preferred result
United Australia	Horace Harper	9,280	51.5	
Labor (NSW)	Joseph Cahill	8,725	48.5	
United Australia gain from Labor (NSW)		Swing	N/A	

==== 1930 ====
1930 New South Wales state election: Arncliffe
Party	Candidate	Votes	%	±%
Labor	Joseph Cahill	11,585	66.3	
Nationalist	David Rogers	5,696	32.6	
Communist	Frederick Farrall	204	1.2	
Total formal votes		17,485	97.9	
Informal votes		368	2.1	
Turnout		17,853	95.4	
Labor win		(new seat)		

Joseph Cahill (Labor) was the sitting member for the abolished district of St George which was largely replaced by Arncliffe.
