= 2017 North Shore state by-election =

Election result for North Shore, New South Wales, Australia

- 8 April 2017

	First party	Second party	Third party
		IND
Candidate	Felicity Wilson	Carrolyn Corrigan	Justin Alick
Party	Liberal	Independent	Greens
Popular vote	18,081	10,122	6,723
Percentage	42.8%	23.9%	15.9%
Swing	▼15.3pp	▲23.9pp	▲1.3pp
TPP	54.7%	45.3%
TPP swing	▼16.5pp	▲45.53pp
MP before election
Jillian Skinner
Liberal
Elected MP
Felicity Wilson
Liberal

A by-election was held in the state electoral district of North Shore on 8 April 2017. The by-election was triggered by the resignation of Jillian Skinner (Liberal) after a cabinet reshuffle. It was held on the same day as the Gosford and Manly state by-elections.

== Dates ==
Date	Event
17 March 2017	Writ of election issued by the Speaker and close of electoral rolls
Noon, 22 March 2017	Close of nominations for party-endorsed candidates
Noon, 23 March 2017	Close of nominations for other candidates
8 April 2017	Polling day, between the hours of 8 am and 6 pm

== Candidates ==
The candidates in ballot paper order are as follows:

Candidate nominations
Party	Candidate	Notes (not on ballot paper)
Independent	Harry Fine	
Independent	Carolyn Corrigan	Mosman councillor and specialist nurse. She is a strong opponent of the controversial forced council amalgamations. She is the former President of the Save Our Councils Coalition.
Independent	Ian Mutton	"Community consultation on council mergers" and expanding the number of parks in the area.
Liberal Party	Felicity Wilson	Corporate affairs director of infrastructure company Broadspectrum defeated Tim James to win Liberal preselection to defend the seat. Wilson had indicated her support for controversial council mergers.
Voluntary Euthanasia Party (NSW)	Brian Beaumont Owles	
Greens	Justin Alick	Overseas aid worker who grew up in a farm in Queensland and went to school in Armidale in northern NSW. Alick is against the Spit Tunnel and is pushing for a new train line instead.
Animal Justice Party	Ila Lessing	
Christian Democratic Party (Fred Nile Group)	Silvana Nile	Wife of party leader Fred Nile. She claims to be running on a "pro-family, pro-marriage and pro-life" platform.

== Results ==
New South Wales state by-election, 2017: North Shore
Party	Candidate	Votes	%	±%
Liberal	Felicity Wilson	18,081	42.8	−15.3
Independent	Carolyn Corrigan	10,122	23.9	+23.9
Greens	Justin Alick	6,723	15.9	+1.3
Independent	Ian Mutton	3,456	8.2	+8.2
Independent	Harry Fine	1,182	2.8	+2.8
Voluntary Euthanasia	Brian Beaumont Owles	998	2.4	+2.4
Animal Justice	Ila Lessing	911	2.2	+2.2
Christian Democrats	Silvana Nile	819	1.9	+1.1
Total formal votes		42,292	98.1	+0.0
Informal votes		837	1.9	−0.0
Turnout		43,129	78.8	−9.4
Two-candidate-preferred result
Liberal	Felicity Wilson	19,733	54.7	−16.5
Independent	Carolyn Corrigan	16,334	45.3	+45.3
Liberal hold				

== See also ==
- Electoral results for the district of North Shore
- List of New South Wales state by-elections
