= Electoral district of North Shore =

North Shore New South Wales—Legislative Assembly
- Interactive map of district boundaries from the 2023 state election
- State: New South Wales
- Dates current: 1920–1927; 1981–present
- MP: Felicity Wilson
- Party: Liberal
- Namesake: North Shore
- Electors: 55,332 (2019)
- Area: 25.09 km^{2} (9.7 sq mi)
- Demographic: Inner-metropolitan
Electorates around North Shore:
Willoughby	Willoughby	Manly
Lane Cove	North Shore	Vaucluse
Balmain	Sydney	Vaucluse

North Shore is an electoral district of the Legislative Assembly in the Australian state of New South Wales, located on Sydney's lower North Shore. It is currently held by Liberal MP Felicity Wilson.

== History ==
North Shore was originally created as a five-member electorate with the introduction of proportional representation in 1920, replacing Middle Harbour, Mosman, St Leonards and Willoughby and named after the North Shore of Sydney Harbour. It was abolished in 1927 and replaced by Lane Cove, Manly, Mosman, Neutral Bay, North Sydney and Willoughby. It was recreated in 1981, replacing Kirribilli.

It was originally expected to be a very safe Liberal seat; northern Sydney has been the power base for the Liberals and their predecessors for over a century. However, it was held by independents from 1981 to 1991—most notably Ted Mack from 1981 to 1988. The Liberals did not take the seat until 1991, but have held it with virtually no difficulty since then.

While Labor frequently runs dead in northern Sydney, North Shore is very unfriendly territory for Labor even by northern Sydney standards. Labor has never tallied more than 37 percent of the two-party vote. In the last four elections, Labor candidates have been pushed into third place, and have struggled to get to 20 percent of the primary vote.

== Geography ==
On its current boundaries, North Shore takes in the suburbs of Cremorne Point, Kirribilli, Kurraba Point, Lavender Bay, McMahons Point, Milsons Point, Mosman, Neutral Bay, North Sydney, Waverton, Wollstonecraft and parts of St Leonards.

== Members for North Shore ==
First incarnation (1920–1927)
Member	Party	Term	Member	Party	Term	Member	Party	Term	Member	Party	Term	Member	Party	Term
Alfred Reid	Ind. Nationalist	1920–1922	Arthur Cocks	Nationalist	1920–1925	Reginald Weaver	Nationalist	1920–1925	Richard Arthur	Nationalist	1920–1927	Cecil Murphy	Labor	1920–1927
William Fell	Independent Coalitionist	1922–1927	Arthur Cocks	Nationalist	1925–1927	Reginald Weaver	Nationalist	1920–1925	Richard Arthur	Nationalist	1920–1927	Cecil Murphy	Labor	1920–1927
William Fell	Independent Coalitionist	1922–1927	Alfred Reid	Nationalist	1925–1927	Reginald Weaver	Nationalist	1920–1925	Richard Arthur	Nationalist	1920–1927	Cecil Murphy	Labor	1920–1927
William Fell	Independent Coalitionist	1922–1927	Alfred Reid	Nationalist	1925–1927	Alick Kay	Independent	1925–1926	Richard Arthur	Nationalist	1920–1927	Cecil Murphy	Labor	1920–1927
William Fell	Independent Coalitionist	1922–1927	Alfred Reid	Nationalist	1925–1927	Arthur Tonge	Labor	1926–1927	Richard Arthur	Nationalist	1920–1927	Cecil Murphy	Labor	1920–1927
Second incarnation (1981–present)
Member	Party	Term												
Ted Mack	Independent	1981–1988												
Robyn Read	Independent	1988–1991												
Phillip Smiles	Liberal	1991–1993												
Jillian Skinner	Liberal	1994–2017												
Felicity Wilson	Liberal	2017–present												

== Election results ==
2023 New South Wales state election: North Shore
Party	Candidate	Votes	%	±%
Liberal	Felicity Wilson	21,308	44.23	−2.37
Independent	Helen Conway	10,527	21.85	+21.85
Labor	Godfrey Santer	8,239	17.10	+4.75
Greens	James Mullan	5,305	11.01	−0.28
Independent	Victoria Walker	1,107	2.30	+2.30
Sustainable Australia	Lachlan Commins	901	1.87	+0.49
Informed Medical Options	Michael Antares	790	1.64	+1.64
Total formal votes		48,177	98.08	−0.44
Informal votes		945	1.92	+0.44
Turnout		49,122	87.03	−0.61
Notional two-party-preferred count
Liberal	Felicity Wilson	24,208	58.22	−9.63
Labor	Godfrey Santer	17,371	41.78	+9.63
Two-candidate-preferred result
Liberal	Felicity Wilson	23,040	55.69	−5.44
Independent	Helen Conway	18,329	44.31	+44.31
Liberal hold				
