= Cecil Murphy =

Australian politician

Cecil Horace Murphy (1 April 1891 – 14 September 1935) was an Australian politician, elected as a member of the New South Wales Legislative Assembly.

Murphy was born in Sydney and was a teacher trainee at Hereford House in Sydney in 1912. He served in the First Australian Imperial Force in 1915 and 1916 as a private, but was invalidated out to the United Kingdom in 1916. He taught in state schools at Artarmon in 1917 and Cleveland Street High School, Surry Hills from 1917 to 1920. He became a student at the University of Sydney in 1920 and later became a real estate agent.

Murphy was elected as a Labor Party member for the seat of North Shore from 1920 to 1927. He married Genevieve Mary Taylor in about 1925 and they had issue three daughters and one son. He died in Sydney.

== Notes ==
New South Wales Legislative Assembly
Preceded by New seat	Member for North Shore; 1920 – 1927; Served alongside: Arthur, Cocks/Kay/Tonge, Reid/Fell, Weaver/Reid	Succeeded by Abolished
