= Alick Kay =

Australian politician and Domain orator

Member of the New South Wales Legislative Assembly for North Shore
- In office 1925–1926
- Preceded by: Arthur Cocks
- Succeeded by: Arthur Tonge

Personal details
- Born: Alick Dudley Kay; 3 October 1884 Petersham, New South Wales
- Died: 4 February 1961 (aged 77) Mosman, New South Wales

Alick Dudley Kay (3 October 1884 – 4 February 1961) was an Australian politician and Domain orator. He is described by the Australian Dictionary of Biography as a "harmless ratbag".

== Early life and education ==
Kay was born in the Sydney suburb of Petersham, New South Wales and educated at Petersham and Stanmore public schools. Alick became a clerk with New South Wales Government Railways and joined the Australian Army in 1915.

== Career ==
Kay ran unsuccessfully for the federal seat of South Sydney for the Nationalist Party in 1917. In 1918 he left the Nationalists and started appearing regularly as an anti-Communist speaker at Sydney Domain. He also travelled regularly to Melbourne to orate next to the Yarra. In 1925, he won one of the five seats of North Shore under proportional representation in the New South Wales Legislative Assembly as an independent. In parliament, he regularly voted with Labor to the horror of his former supporters. Under the electoral system, the Labor Party automatically won his position if he resigned, so Jack Lang offered him a position on the Metropolitan Meat Board in 1926 as a consumers' representative. The Thomas Bavin government passed legislation in 1927 to remove him from the board. After Lang's return to power in 1930, he was reappointed to the board, but was sacked again by the Bertram Stevens government.

== Personal life ==
In 1913, Kay married Mary Elizabeth Clasby, a 52-year-old widow with five children (one of her sons, John Clasby, was briefly a federal MP).

In 1933, Kay travelled to England. His wife had died and he married Dorothy Edith Gamson at Islington in June 1943. He later claimed to have worked for the Ministry of Information during World War II. In 1951, he returned to Sydney, and resumed speaking at the Domain on Sundays. He died in the Sydney suburb of Mosman, survived by his wife.

== Notes ==
New South Wales Legislative Assembly
Preceded by Arthur Cocks	Member for North Shore; 1925 – 1926; Served alongside: Arthur, Fell, Murphy, Reid	Succeeded by Arthur Tonge
