= Felicity Wilson =

Australian politician (born 1982)

Felicity Wilson MP
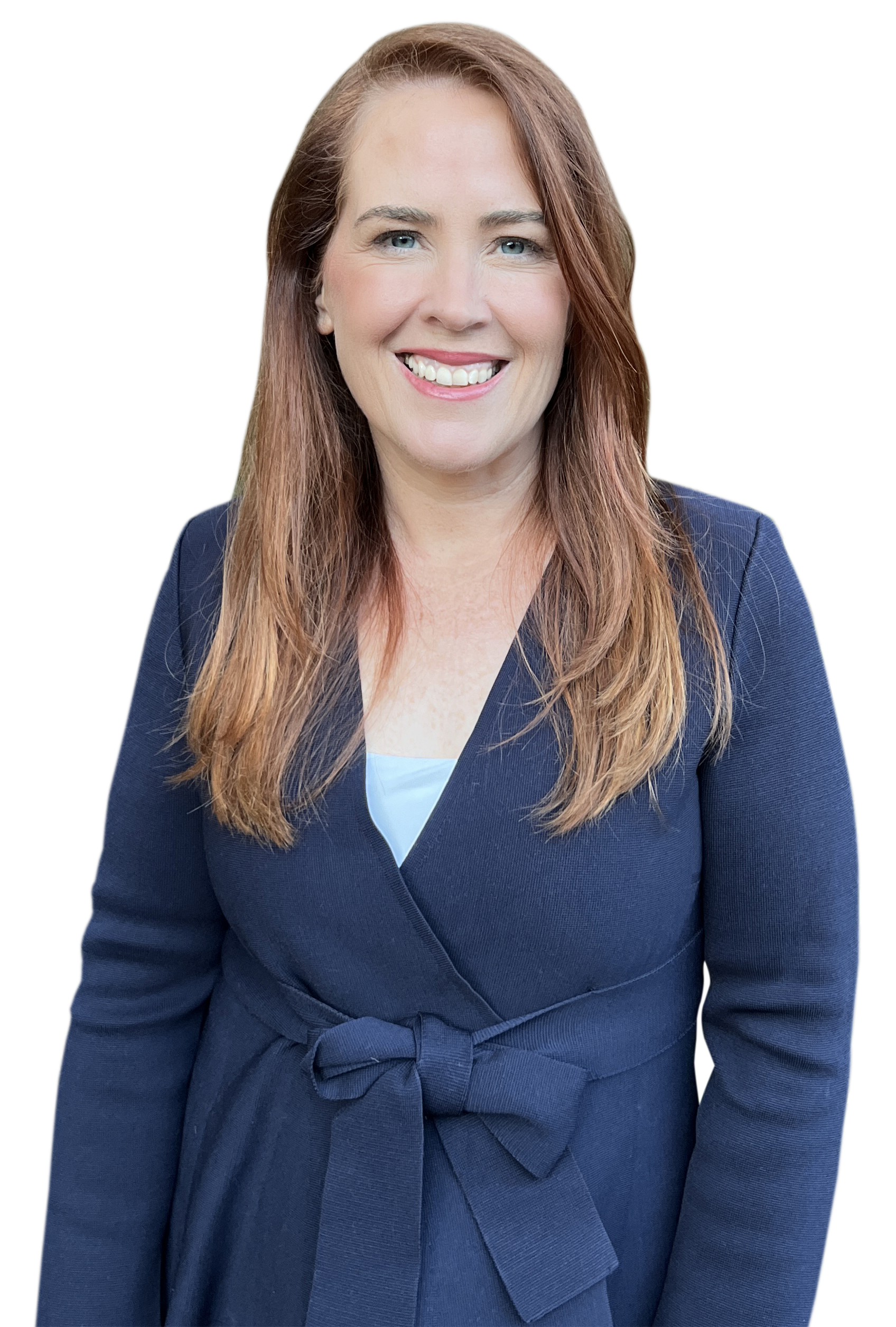

Member of the New South Wales Legislative Assembly for North Shore
- Incumbent
- Assumed office 8 April 2017
- Preceded by: Jillian Skinner
- Majority: 11.1 points

Shadow Minister for Women
- Incumbent
- Assumed office 10 April 2025
- Preceded by: Leslie Williams

Shadow Minister for Aboriginal Affairs
- Incumbent
- Assumed office 10 April 2025
- Preceded by: Leslie Williams

Shadow Minister for Early Education
- Incumbent
- Assumed office January 2026
- Preceded by: Sarah Mitchell

Personal details
- Born: Cessnock, New South Wales, Australia
- Party: Liberal Party of Australia (NSW Division)
- Education: University of Sydney; Macquarie University; University of New South Wales
- Occupation: Parliamentarian
- Website: https://www.felicitywilson.com.au/

Felicity Lesley Wilson (born 7 June 1982) is an Australian politician. She has been a member of the New South Wales Legislative Assembly representing the electoral district of North Shore for the Liberal Party since 2017.

Wilson was first elected on 8 April 2017 at the North Shore state by-election held to replace the previous member, former Minister for Health Jillian Skinner, and was re-elected in the 2019 and 2023 elections.

Wilson is currently the Shadow Minister for Women, Shadow Minister for Aboriginal Affairs, and Shadow Minister for Early Education.

She has previously served as the NSW Parliamentary Secretary to the Treasurer and for COVID Recovery, and as the NSW Parliamentary Secretary for the Environment.

== Early life and background ==
Wilson was born in 1982 in Cessnock as the youngest of 3 children. She lives in Cremorne as a single mum to her 2 children, both born since her election to parliament.

In her inaugural speech to the Parliament, she spoke about her turbulent childhood due to her father's undiagnosed schizophrenia which led to violence experienced by her and her sisters. She pledged her commitment to addressing the stigma associated with mental illness.

She holds a Master of Public Policy from the University of Sydney, a Master of Business Administration from University of New South Wales, and a Bachelor of Media from Macquarie University.

Before entering politics, Wilson was a corporate affairs director for Broadspectrum, and had previously worked in executive and corporate affairs roles at the Property Council of Australia and Caltex.

Prior to her election, Wilson served as Vice President of the NSW Liberal Party and as President of the Liberal Women's Council (NSW) from 2012 to 2015.

== Political career ==
Wilson was first elected to the NSW Legislative Assembly at a by-election on 8 April 2017 to fill the vacancy in the electoral district of North Shore caused by the retirement of Jillian Skinner.

She has gone on to be re-elected in two subsequent elections, the 2019 New South Wales state election and 2023 New South Wales state election.

Wilson was appointed to the NSW Shadow Cabinet by Leader of the Opposition Mark Speakman in April 2025. She was reappointed to the NSW Shadow Cabinet by newly elected leader Kellie Sloane and promoted with the additional portfolio of Early Education.

Wilson has a history of advocating for women's rights and has been outspoken on indigenous affairs. During her time in Government, she supported legislation to decriminalise abortion and introduce safe access zones around abortion clinics, as well as supporting action on climate change. She was part of the Liberals for Yes campaign during the 2023 Australian Indigenous Voice referendum.

Prior to the defeat of the Liberal/National Coalition government led by Premier Dominic Perrottet in the 2023 New South Wales state election, Wilson served as Parliamentary Secretary to the Treasurer and for COVID Recovery.

Wilson provided incorrect information in a statutory declaration and 'solemn declaration' when she falsely claimed to have lived in the North Shore constituency for a decade. In relation to that affair, a sub-committee of the Mosman branch of the Liberal Party recorded that it had been left 'unimpressed by the apparent evasiveness of many answers' on Wilson's part, 'together with the lack of contrition for any embarrassment caused to the party'.

In a separate scandal, Wilson admitted to providing false information on political forms having overstated the number of undergraduate university degrees that she held. Ms Wilson claimed she had a double degree from Macquarie University when she applied to be vice-president of the NSW Liberal state executive in 2013. However, she later admitted to holding only one undergraduate degree.

Despite a 16.5-point against the Liberals on a two-candidate preferred basis, Wilson was elected on 8 April 2017 at the North Shore state by-election held to replace the previous member, Jillian Skinner.

In 2018, while heavily pregnant with her first child, Wilson was challenged for preselection by the hard-right's Tim James, who had lost preselection to Wilson first in 2017. Wilson was strongly supported by the Premier Gladys Berejiklian along with the moderate wing of the Liberal Party. After Wilson narrowly won the vote, James and right-wing supporters chose to challenge the preselection in the NSW Supreme Court. However, his case was dismissed.

Wilson suffered a 10.1-point swing against her on a two-candidate preferred basis at the 2019 election, but retained her seat.

New South Wales Legislative Assembly
Preceded by Jillian Skinner	Member for North Shore; 2017–present	Incumbent
