= 1935 New South Wales state election =

- 11 May 1935

All 90 seats in the New South Wales Legislative Assembly 46 Assembly seats were needed for a majority
- Registered: 1,528,713
- Turnout: 1,255,419 (96.06%) (▼0.34 pp)
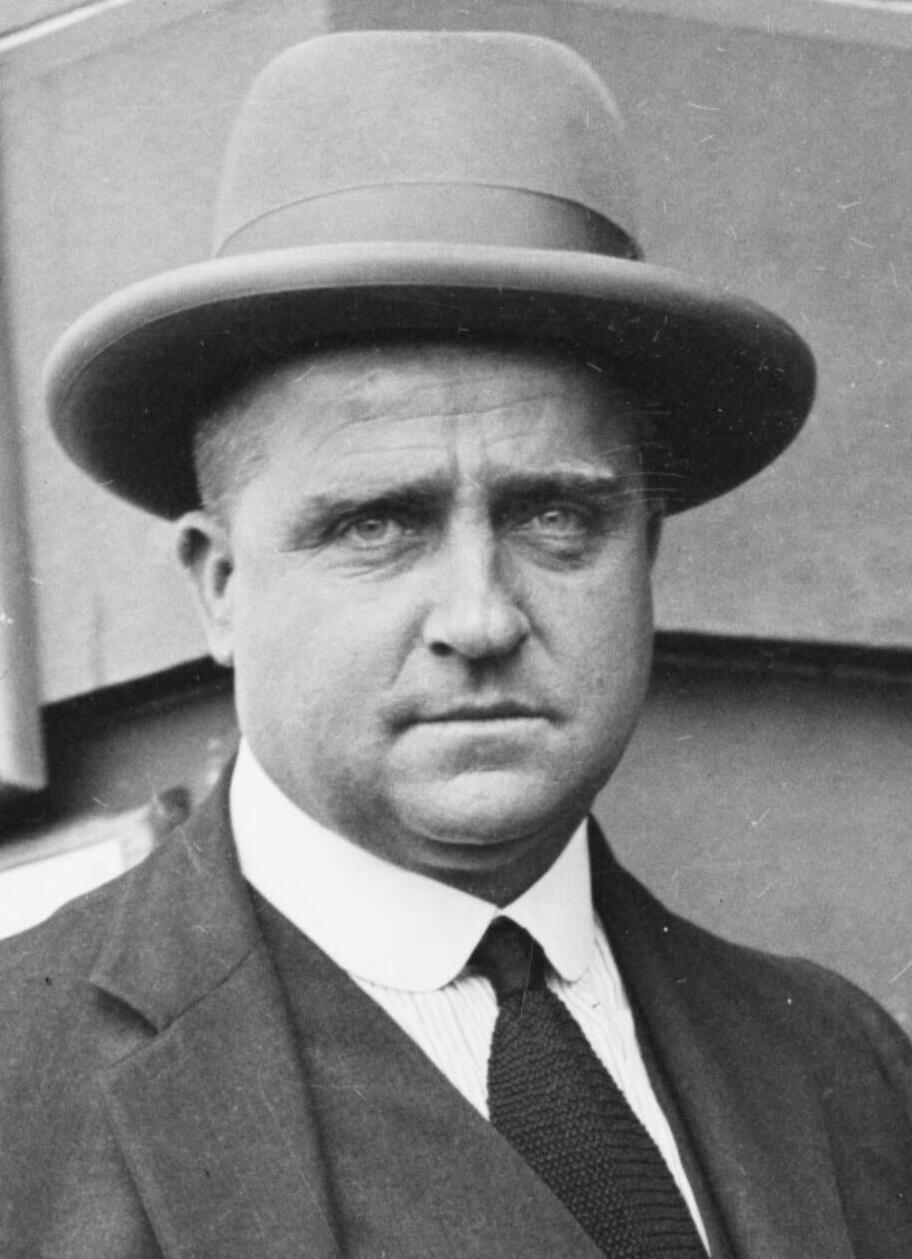

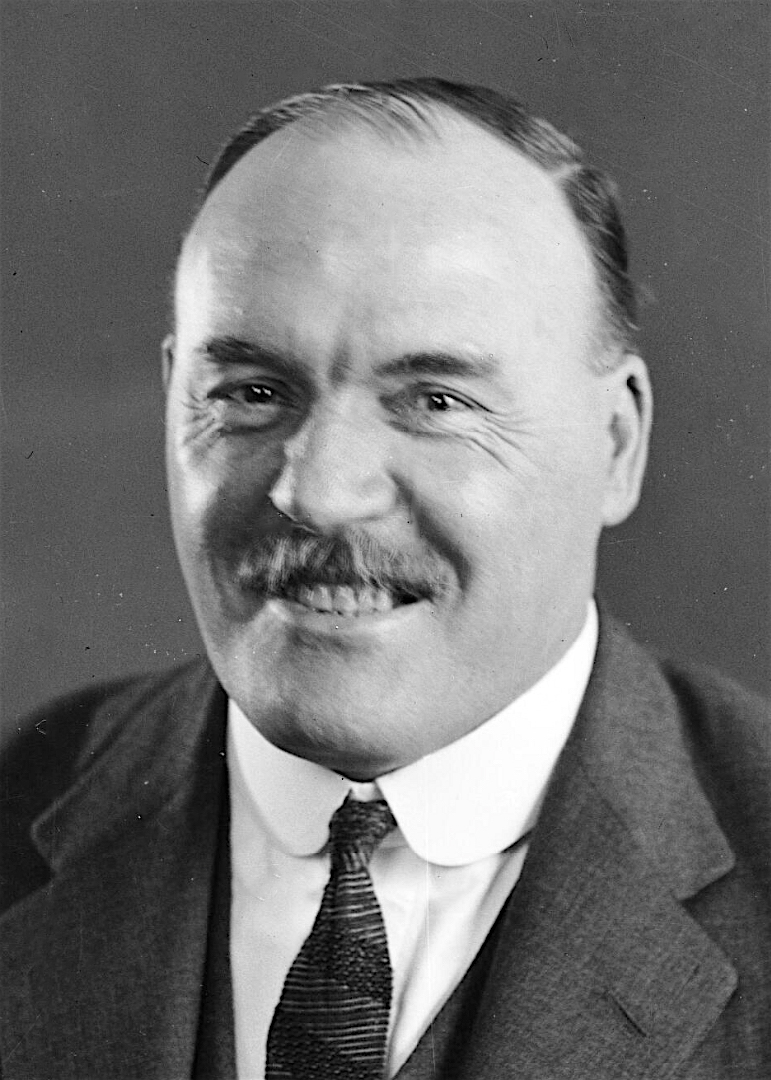

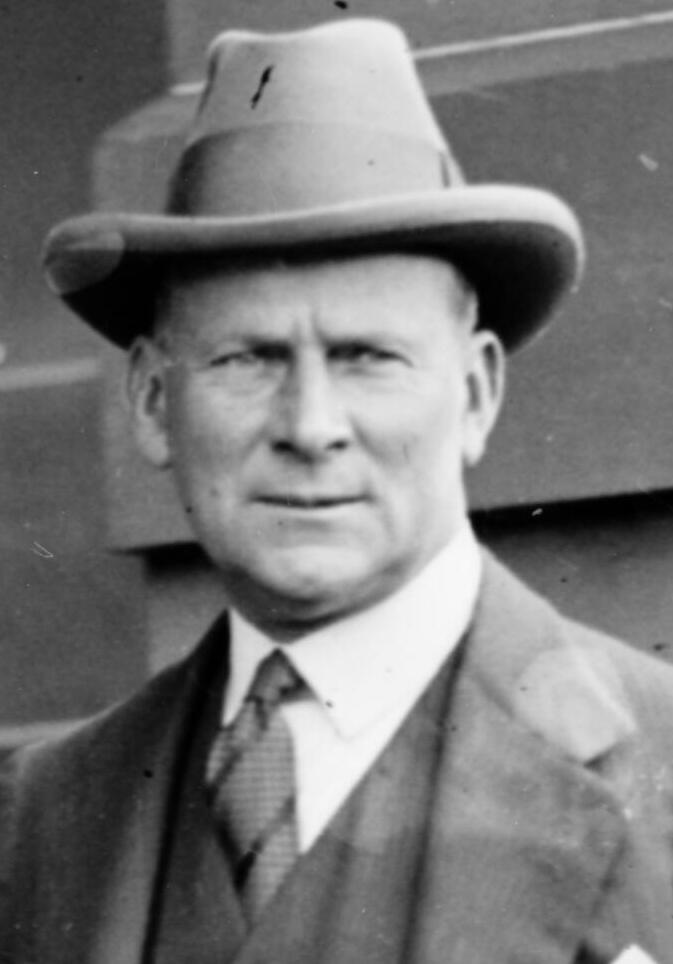
	First party	Second party	Third party
Leader	Bertram Stevens	Jack Lang	Michael Bruxner
Party	United Australia	Lang Labor	Country
Leader since	5 April 1932	31 July 1923	27 April 1932
Leader's seat	Croydon	Auburn	Tenterfield
Last election	41 seats, 36.74%	24 seats, 40.16%	23 seats, 13.16%
Seats won	38	29	23
Seat change	▼3	▲5	Steady
Popular vote	415,485	532,486	162,178
Percentage	33.10%	42.42%	12.92%
Swing	▼3.64%	▲2.26%	▼0.24%
- Results by division for the Legislative Assembly, shaded by winning party's margin of victory.

- Composition of New South Wales Legislative Assembly following the election.
Premier before election
Bertram Stevens
United Australia (United Australia–Country Coalition)
Elected Premier
Bertram Stevens
United Australia (United Australia–Country Coalition)

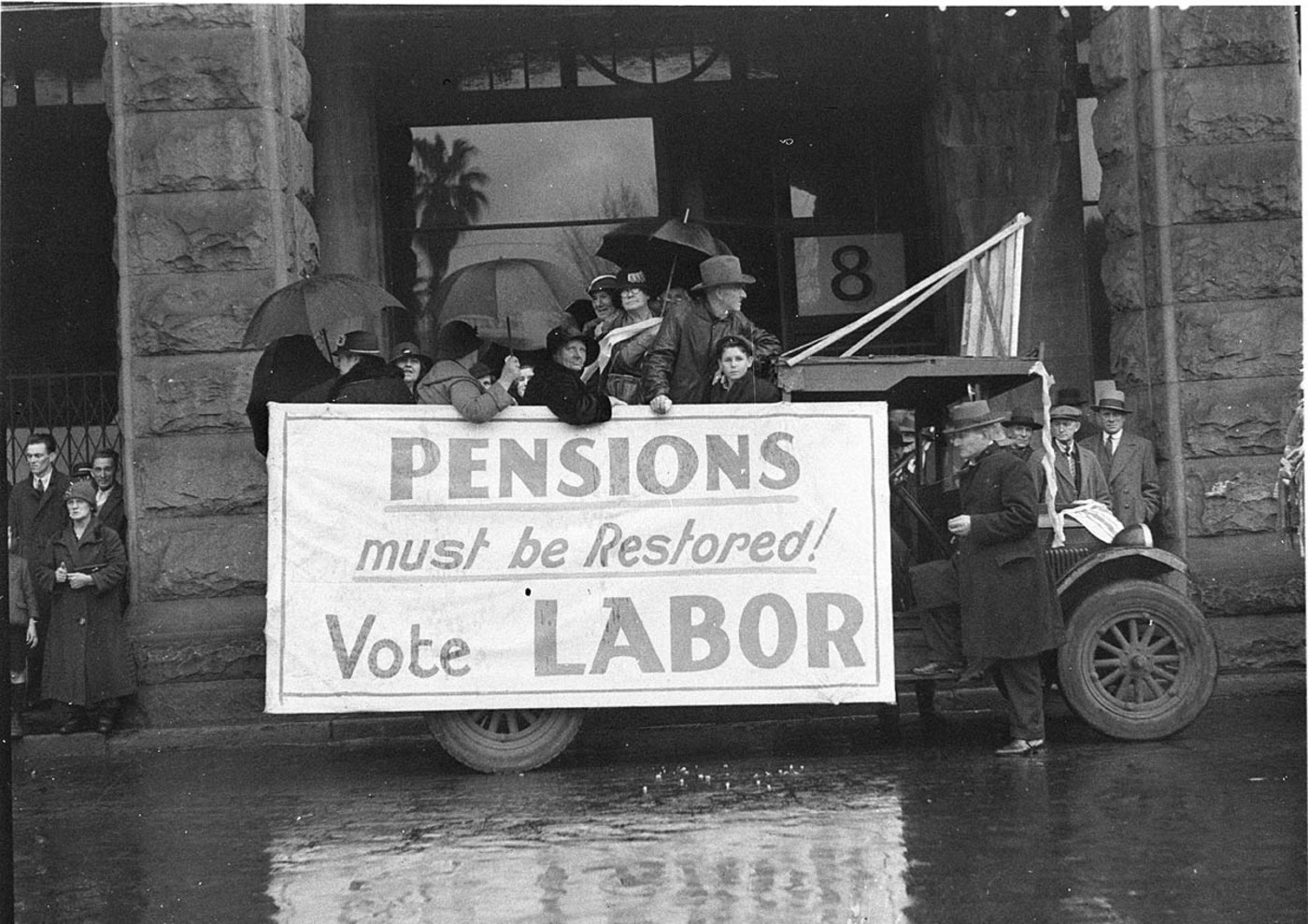
Campaigning in 1934

The 1935 New South Wales state election was held on 11 May 1935. This election was for all of the 90 seats in the 31st New South Wales Legislative Assembly and was conducted in single member constituencies with compulsory preferential voting.

The result of the election was:

- United Australia Party 38 seats
- Country Party 23 seats
- Australian Labor Party (NSW) 29 seats.

The UAP–Country Coalition of Bertram Stevens/Michael Bruxner had a majority of 32 (down 10) and continued in government throughout the term.

Labor (NSW) and the Federal Executive of the Australian Labor Party were still divided at the 1935 election and Federal Labor ran candidates in 22 seats without success. The parties were re-united in 1936. Jack Lang remained party leader and Leader of the Opposition throughout the term of the parliament.

== Key dates ==
Date	Event
10 February 1935	Second Stevens ministry sworn in.
12 April 1935	The Legislative Assembly was dissolved, and writs were issued by the Governor to proceed with an election.
18 April 1935	Nominations for candidates for the election closed at noon.
11 May 1935	Polling day.
10 June 1935	The writs were returned and the results formally declared.
12 June 1935	Opening of 31st Parliament.

== Results ==
New South Wales state election, 11 May 1935 Legislative Assembly << 1932–1938 >>
Enrolled voters	1,347,884 (Note: There were 1,528,713 enrolled voters but 180,829 were enrolled in 11 electorates (five UAP, four Country and two Labor) which were uncontested at the election.)				
Votes cast	1,255,419		Turnout	96.06	−0.34
Informal votes	39,333		Informal	3.04	0.83
Summary of votes by party
Party	Primary votes	%	Swing	Seats	Change
Labor (NSW)	532,486	42.42	+2.26	29	+ 5
United Australia	415,485	33.10	–3.64	38	– 5
Country	162,178	12.92	–0.24	23	± 0
Federal Labor	59,694	4.75	+0.51	0	± 0
Communist	19,105	1.52	+0.60	0	± 0
Ind. United Australia	11,114	0.89	+0.21	0	± 0
Centre	7,489	0.60	+0.60	0	± 0
Independent Labor	3,774	0.30	+0.16	0	± 0
Social Credit	1,996	0.16	+0.16	0	± 0
Independents	42,098	3.35	+1.17	0	± 0
Total	1,255,419			90	

Popular vote
Labor (NSW)	42.42%
United	33.10%
Country	12.92%
Federal Labor	4.75%
Others	2.9%
Parliamentary seats
Labor (NSW)	29
United	38
Country	23
Federal Labor	0
Others	0

== Retiring members ==
=== Labor ===
- William Brennan (Hamilton)
- Peter Connolly (Newcastle) — lost party endorsement
- Tom Keegan (Glebe)

=== United Australia ===
- Sir Thomas Henley (Burwood)

== Changing seats ==
Seats changing hands
Seat	1932		1935	
Seat	Party	Member	Member	Party
Arncliffe	United Australia	Horace Harper	Joseph Cahill	Labor (NSW)
Bathurst	Country	Gordon Wilkins	Gus Kelly	Labor (NSW)
Canterbury	United Australia	Edward Hocking	Arthur Tonge	Labor (NSW)
Goulburn	United Australia	Peter Loughlin	Jack Tully	Labor (NSW)
Mudgee	Country	David Spring	Bill Dunn	Labor (NSW)

== See also ==
- Candidates of the 1935 New South Wales state election
- Members of the New South Wales Legislative Assembly, 1935–1938

== Bibliography ==
- Nairn, Bede (1995). Jack Lang the 'Big Fella':Jack Lang and the Australian Labor Party 1891–1949. Melbourne University Press Melbourne. ISBN 0522846963. OCLC 34416531.
