= Arthur Cocks (politician) =

Australian politician (1862–1943)

Sir Arthur Cocks KBE
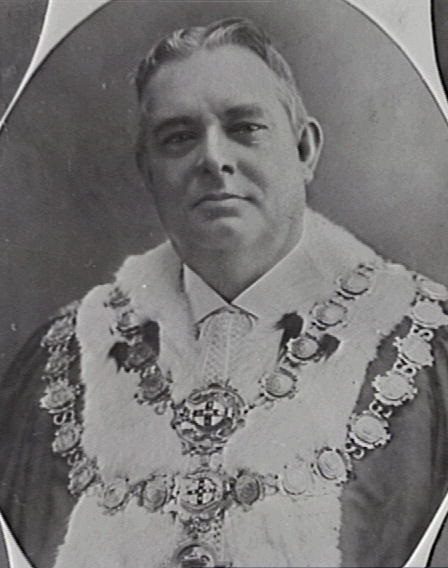

Member of the New South Wales Legislative Assembly
- In office 25 March 1922 – 14 February 1925 Serving with Richard Arthur, Cecil Murphy, Alfred Reid, William Scott Fell, Reginald Weaver
- Preceded by: Constituency established
- Succeeded by: Alick Kay
- Constituency: North Shore
- In office 21 October 1910 – 18 February 1920
- Preceded by: Edward Clark
- Succeeded by: Constituency abolished
- Constituency: St Leonards

Colonial Treasurer of New South Wales
- In office 13 April 1922 – 14 February 1925
- Premier: George Fuller
- Preceded by: Jack Lang
- Succeeded by: George Fuller
- In office 20 December 1921
- Premier: George Fuller
- Preceded by: Jack Lang
- Succeeded by: Jack Lang

45th Lord Mayor of Sydney
- In office 1 January 1913 – 31 December 1913
- Preceded by: George Thomas Clarke
- Succeeded by: Richard Richards

Member of the Sydney Municipal Council
- In office 1906–1914

Personal details
- Born: Arthur Alfred Clement Cocks; 27 May 1862 near Heathcote, Victoria
- Died: Mosman, New South Wales, Australia
- Party: Nationalist
- Other political affiliations: Liberal Reform
- Spouse: Elizabeth Agnes Gibb (m. 1884)
- Children: 2
- Occupation: Politician

Sir Arthur Alfred Clement Cocks KBE (27 May 1862 – 25 April 1943) was an Australian politician, elected as a member of the New South Wales Legislative Assembly.

== Early life ==
Cocks was born at Wild Duck Creek, near Heathcote, Victoria and educated at a state school at Richmond before entering retailing at 14. He established a business of wholesale jewellers and opticians, Arthur Cocks & Co.

== Political career ==
He was a member of the Sydney Municipal Council from 1906 to 1914 and was Lord Mayor of Sydney in 1913 and was in 1920 involved in the foundation of the Civic Reform Association.

Cocks represented St Leonards from 1910 to 1920 and North Shore from 1920 to 1925, initially for the Liberal Reform Party and then the Nationalist Party. He was Colonial Treasurer on 20 December 1921 then from 13 April 1922 to 14 February 1925 in the Fuller ministry.

== Personal life and death ==
He married Elizabeth Agnes Gibb in 1884 and they had a son and a daughter.

Cocks died on 25 April 1943 in Mosman, New South Wales. His wife and children predeceased him.

== Honours ==
Cocks was appointed a Knight Commander of the Order of the British Empire (KBE) in 1925.

New South Wales Legislative Assembly
Preceded by Edward Clark	Member for St Leonards; 1910 – 1920	Succeeded by Abolished
Preceded by New seat	Member for North Shore; 1920 – 1925; Served alongside: Arthur, Murphy, Reid/Fell, Weaver	Succeeded by Alick Kay
