= William Scott Fell =

Australian politician

William Scott Fell (20 July 1866 – 7 September 1930) was an Australian shipping merchant and politician.

Fell was born at Elleray Villa, Rosneath, Dunbartonshire, Scotland and educated at Dollar Academy and Graham's Academy, Greenock, Scotland. After his father's death, they migrated with their mother, reaching Sydney in 1879. He set up as a broker and then had mixed success as a shipping and coal contractor, but had achieved success by the outbreak of World War I. He married Emma Catherine Bain in September 1889.

Fell stood for election as an Independent Liberal to the seat of Middle Harbour in the New South Wales Legislative Assembly in 1907 and 1913. In 1922, he won North Shore as an Independent Coalitionist candidate, which he held until his resignation in 1927 to contest a by-election for the federal seat of Warringah.

Fell died of a stroke in his Macquarie Street, Sydney home. He had a wife, two surviving sons and three surviving daughters. His brother, David Fell, was also a member of the NSW Legislative Assembly, and their cousin was the industrialist John Fell.

New South Wales Legislative Assembly
Preceded by Alfred Reid	Member for North Shore; 1922 – 1927; Served alongside: Arthur, Cocks/Kay/Tonge, Murphy, Weaver/Reid	Succeeded by Abolished
