= Reginald Weaver =

Australian politician (1876–1945)

The Honourable Reginald Weaver
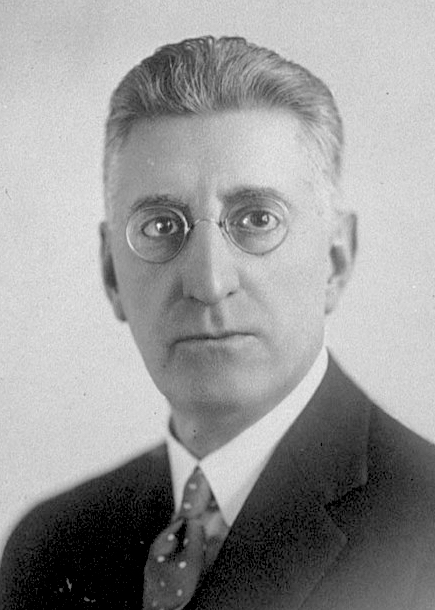
- Weaver in October 1932

16th Leader of the Opposition of New South Wales
- In office 10 February 1944 – 12 November 1945
- Monarch: George VI
- Deputy: Athol Richardson
- Preceded by: Alexander Mair
- Succeeded by: Alexander Mair

19th Speaker of the New South Wales Legislative Assembly
- In office 4 August 1937 – 27 May 1941
- Preceded by: Sir Daniel Levy
- Succeeded by: Daniel Clyne

Member of the New South Wales Legislative Assembly for Neutral Bay
- In office 8 October 1927 – 12 November 1945
- Preceded by: New district
- Succeeded by: Ivan Black

Personal details
- Born: Reginald Walter Darcy Weaver; 18 July 1876 Quirindi, Colony of New South Wales
- Died: 12 November 1945 (aged 69) Hornsby, New South Wales, Australia
- Spouse: Gertrude Walker
- Education: Newington College

Military service
- Allegiance: Australia
- Branch/service: (Australia) Australian Army
- Years of service: 1918
- Rank: Private
- Unit: AIF
- Battles/wars: World War I

Reginald Walter Darcy Weaver (18 July 1876 – 12 November 1945) was an Australian conservative parliamentarian who served in the New South Wales Legislative Assembly for 28 years. Serving from 1917 in the backbenches, he entered the cabinet of Thomas Bavin in 1929 as Secretary for Mines and Minister for Forests until he returned to opposition in 1930. Following the success of the United Australia Party in the 1932 election, Weaver returned as the Secretary for Public Works and Minister for Health in the Stevens ministry.

In 1935, he was dropped from the ministry but was later elected as the Speaker of the New South Wales Legislative Assembly in 1937, holding office until the Mair Government lost power in 1941. Weaver then witnessed the death of the United Australia Party in 1943 and became the leader of the new Democratic Party in 1944. He was then involved in the negotiations to form the New South Wales branch of the Liberal Party, with Weaver becoming the first leader of the state Liberal Party in April 1945. He served only briefly until dying of a heart attack in November 1945.

== Early life ==
Reginald Weaver was born at Kickerbill station, Quirindi, New South Wales, on the Liverpool Plains, the twelfth child of English-born parents Richard Weaver and his wife Fanny Seymour Weaver. Weaver was educated at Newington College (1890–1894) in Sydney before joining two of his brothers in a stock and station agency in Forbes and then branching out on his own at Condobolin and Narrandera. A member of the Farmers and Settlers' Association, Weaver first entered politics when he was elected as an Alderman on Condobolin Municipal Council from 1898 to 1900 and then later as an Alderman on Narrandera Municipal Council in 1902. On 19 April 1899, he married Gertrude Susan Bond Walker at St Andrew's Cathedral, Sydney.

== Early political career ==
In 1910, Weaver, now living in Dubbo, contested the seat of Ashburnham for the Liberal Party but was defeated on 46-53% against the Labor Party's John Lynch. Undeterred, Weaver stood again in 1913 as the Farmers and Settlers Party candidate for the seat of Macquarie but was narrowly defeated with 49.61% against the Labor Party candidate's 50.39%. Weaver contested the result, accusing the Labor Party of manipulating the rolls. An inquiry found no fault in these accusations against the Labor Party, but instead found Weaver's own organisers guilty of roll-stuffing.

Moving to North Sydney in 1916, he established a real estate business and on 24 March 1917 entered the New South Wales Legislative Assembly at the 1917 election, as the Nationalist Party candidate for the seat of Willoughby with 51.68%. A fervent Imperialist and pro-conscriptionist, he was rejected as medically unfit for the Australian Imperial Force in 1916 but eventually enlisted on 23 August 1918. Raising over £25,000 in War Loans, Weaver was discharged from the Army on 2 December 1918. When the Willoughby seat was abolished at the next election, Weaver contested the new multi-member electorate of North Shore, receiving 15.31% and the first seat on the electorate.

Suspicious of the Irish Catholic establishment, embodied by the Labor Party, Weaver joined the Protestant Federation in 1921 and became a sympathiser of the right-wing New Guard. At the 1922 election, he was re-elected with an increased margin of 20.16%, gaining first place once again. He served until, citing business reasons, he retired from parliament on 18 April 1925.

== Minister of the Crown ==
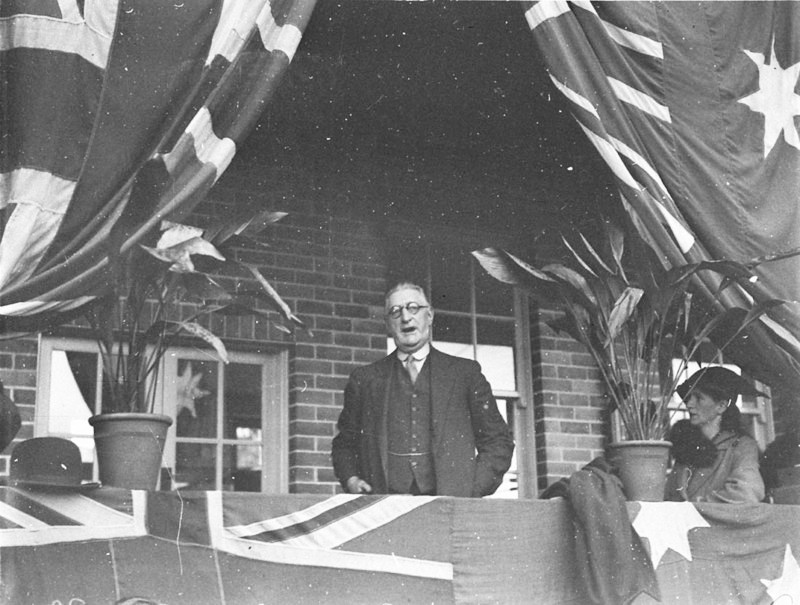
Weaver, as Minister for Health, opening Ryde District Hospital in 1934.

Weaver soon returned to politics, when on 8 October 1927, at the 1927 election, he was elected to the seat of Neutral Bay with 69.49%. Rising to prominence within the party, Weaver gained a reputation as an independent-minded but powerful debater in the House, crossing the floor on many issues.

Nevertheless, Weaver was appointed by Premier Thomas Bavin on 16 April 1929 as the Secretary for Mines and Minister for Forests. Taking over the worsening dispute on the northern coalfields, he believed the struggle to be communist-inspired and made possible by unemployment relief and child endowment and attempted to resolve an industrial dispute by supporting the use of non-union labour in the Rothbury coal mine. The resultant protests led to the Rothbury riot and the death of one miner. His suspension of unemployment relief gained him many enemies from the Labor Party. This promotion proved short-lived however, when the Bavin Government was defeated at the October 1930 election, at which Weaver was returned with 65.42%, by Jack Lang's Labor Party.

In opposition, Weaver witnessed the end of the Nationalist Party and was elected Deputy Leader of the new United Australia Party (UAP) in New South Wales in 1931. When Lang's Government was dismissed on 13 May 1932 by the Governor of New South Wales, Sir Philip Game, an early election was called by caretaker-Premier and UAP Leader, Bertram Stevens. At the 11 June 1932 election, in which Weaver was returned with 80.70%, Stevens' UAP/Country Coalition gained 31 seats and won government. Stevens had already appointed Weaver as the Secretary for Public Works and Minister for Health on 16 May 1932.

A competent, if controversial member of the cabinet, Weaver, as Minister for Health, travelled extensively and concentrated on the expansion of hospitals, becoming Director of Royal Prince Alfred Hospital (1929–1930). His determination to exert more control over hospitals and the banning of honorary doctors from local hospital boards brought him into conflict with the NSW branch of the British Medical Association. His strict control over Hospital administrators brought him into conflict with the medical community and he was eventually dropped from the cabinet on 10 February 1935 by Premier Stevens, who found him "too extreme in personal independence" and possessing a "needlessly sharp tongue." Weaver returned to the backbenches and won re-election at the 1935 election on 11 May with an increased margin of 88.42%. On 3 July 1935, King George V, on the advice of the Governor of New South Wales, Lord Gowrie, granted him retention of the title "The Honourable", for having served more than three years on the Executive Council of New South Wales.

== Later career ==
Weaver as Speaker in 1941

When Sir Daniel Levy retired from parliament, Weaver was elected as the Speaker of the Legislative Assembly on 4 August 1937. In 1938, he was cleared by a judicial inquiry, chaired by Sir Percival Rogers, into Jack Lang's allegations of fraud and corruption in the sale of state enterprises in 1933 when Weaver was the Secretary for Public Works. At the 1938 election Weaver was returned uncontested. He served as Speaker until the succeeding government of Alexander Mair was defeated at the May 1941 election by the Labor Party under William McKell. Weaver was returned in his seat uncontested.

However, with the very poor results of the federal United Australia Party under Billy Hughes at the 1943 federal election, the UAP disintegrated. A large number of former UAP members in New South Wales merged with the Commonwealth Party to form Democratic Party in November 1943. Mair resigned as leader of Democratic Party and Leader of the Opposition on 10 February 1944 and was replaced by Weaver. Weaver then led the party to the 1944 election where it won 19% of the vote and 12 of the 90 seats in the Legislative Assembly. Weaver himself retained his seat with 56.90%.

Weaver's efforts to merge the Democratic Party with the Liberal Democratic Party (LDP) were deadlocked over questions of party organisation and by acrimony between himself and the LDP leader, Ernest White. In 1945, the two parties dissolved and joined the New South Wales branch of the Liberal Party of Australia newly formed by Robert Menzies. Weaver was elected as the first leader of the New South Wales Liberal Party on 20 April 1945.

His term as leader of the newly formed party was to prove short-lived. Weaver suffered a mild heart attack in the Legislative Assembly chamber on the evening of 7 November 1945 and drove himself home. He died a week later on 12 November 1945 at Hornsby Hospital, survived by his wife, son and three daughters. At the resulting by-election on 15 December, Neutral Bay was retained by the Liberal Party candidate, Ivan Black, against a single Independent candidate with 56%.

New South Wales Legislative Assembly
Preceded by John Haynes	Member for Willoughby; 1917–1920	District abolished
New district	Member for North Shore; 1920–1925; With: Arthur, Cocks, Murphy, Reid/Fell	Succeeded by Alfred Reid
New district	Member for Neutral Bay; 1927–1945	Succeeded by Ivan Black
Preceded by Sir Daniel Levy	Speaker of the New South Wales Legislative Assembly; 1937–1941	Succeeded by Daniel Clyne
Political offices
Preceded by Frank Chaffey	Secretary for Mines; 1929–1930	Succeeded by Jack Baddeley
Preceded by Frank Chaffey	Minister for Forests; 1929–1930	Succeeded by William Dunn
Preceded by Mat Davidson	Secretary for Public Works; 1932–1935	Succeeded by Bertram Stevens
Preceded by Bill Ely	Minister for Health; 1932–1935	Succeeded by Herbert FitzSimons
Preceded by Alexander Mair	Leader of the Opposition in New South Wales; 1944–1945	Succeeded by Alexander Mair
Party political offices
Preceded by Alexander Mair	Leader of the Democratic Party; 1944–1945	Party merged into Liberal Party
New political party	Leader of the New South Wales Liberal Party; 1945	Succeeded by Alexander Mair
