= Electoral district of Middle Harbour =

Former state electoral district of New South Wales, Australia

Middle Harbour was an electoral district for the Legislative Assembly in the Australian state of New South Wales, named after Middle Harbour, Sydney and was originally created in the 1904 re-distribution of electorates following the 1903 New South Wales referendum, which required the number of members of the Legislative Assembly to be reduced from 125 to 90. It consisted of part of the abolished seat of Warringah with the balance of Warringah going to St Leonards. In 1920, with the introduction of proportional representation, it was absorbed into North Shore. It was recreated in 1988, replacing Willoughby, and abolished in 1991, being replaced by Willoughby.

== Members for Middle Harbour ==
First incarnation (1904–1920)
Member	Party	Term
Richard Arthur	Liberal Reform	1904–1917
Richard Arthur	Nationalist	1917–1920
Second incarnation (1988–1991)
Member	Party	Term
Peter Collins	Liberal	1988–1991

== Election results ==
1988 New South Wales state election: Middle Harbour
Party	Candidate	Votes	%	±%
Liberal	Peter Collins	20,147	71.2	+5.2
Labor	Marilyn Dodkin	8,161	28.8	−1.1
Total formal votes		28,308	96.4	−1.4
Informal votes		1,061	3.6	+1.4
Turnout		29,369	93.4	
Liberal notional hold		Swing	+3.2	
