= Richard Arthur (Australian politician) =

Australian politician (1865–1932)

Minister for Public Health
- In office 1927–1930
- Preceded by: Robert Stuart-Robertson
- Succeeded by: James McGirr

Member of the New South Wales Legislative Assembly
- In office 1927–1932
- Preceded by: District established
- Succeeded by: Herbert Lloyd
- Constituency: Mosman
- In office 1920–1927 Serving with Arthur Cocks, Alick Kay, Arthur Tonge, Cecil Murphy, Alfred Reid, William Scott Fell, Reginald Weaver
- Preceded by: District established
- Succeeded by: District abolished
- Constituency: North Shore
- In office 1904–1920
- Preceded by: District established
- Succeeded by: District abolished
- Constituency: Middle Harbour

Personal details
- Born: 25 October 1865 Aldershot, Hampshire, England
- Died: 21 May 1932 (aged 66) Mosman, New South Wales, Australia
- Spouse: Jessie Sinclair Bruce (m. 1890)
- Children: 3
- Education: Dover College; University of St Andrews (MA); University of Edinburgh (MB BCh, MD)
- Occupation: Politician; social reformer; medical practitioner

Richard Arthur (25 October 1865 – 21 May 1932) was an Australian politician, social reformer and medical practitioner.

== Family ==
The son of Rev. David Arthur (1827-1910), and Isabella Arthur (1837–1921), née Simpson, Richard Arthur was born in Aldershot, Hampshire, England on 25 October 1865.

He met his wife, Jessie Sinclair Bruce (1886–1959), (Note: His wife's sister, Mary Alexander Sinclair Bruce, was married to Frederick Smythe Willis, sometime mayor of Willoughby, New South Wales and a founder member (and first hon. treasurer) of the Corporation of Accountants of Australia ("Marriage". The Press. Vol. XLIX, no. 8317. 31 October 1892. p. 2.)) the daughter of Rev. Dr. David Bruce (1824–1911), in Australia, and married her, at Coolangatta, near Shoalhaven Heads on 19 March 1890. They had three children: Bruce Murray Arthur (1891–1939), Jessie Gwendolen Arthur (1893–1965), and Beatrice Sinclair Arthur (1894–1950).

== Education and medical career ==
Educated at Dover College, he received a Master of Arts (M.A.) from the University of St Andrews (1885) and a Bachelor of Medicine and Surgery (M.B. Ch.B.) from the University of Edinburgh (1888). He worked in the slums of Edinburgh, but contracted typhoid fever.

He met his wife in Australia, where he had gone to convalesce; and, following his marriage, he returned to Europe and studied hypnotism in Paris, which earned him the advanced degree of Doctor of Medicine (M.D.) from the University of Edinburgh in 1891.

After again becoming ill working in the slums of London, he returned to Australia, and was the first to establish a practice in the Sydney suburb of Mosman, specialising in eye, ear-nose-and-throat, and dental work. He was a director of the Royal Prince Alfred Hospital from 1917 to 1920 and from 1927 to 1931 and of Sydney Hospital from 1924 to 1932.

== Political career ==
- Elected in 1904 to the New South Wales Legislative Assembly as member for Middle Harbour, representing the Liberal and Reform Party.
- In December 1912, he became the inaugural president of the Eugenics Education Society of New South Wales.
- An early advocate of child endowment in 1916, he was a strong supporter of closer settlement and assisted immigration to reduce the Japanese threat.
- In expressing his growing concerns (1919–1921) about the poor quality of life and limited services available to women and children living in the country, he contributed to the formation of the Country Women's Association.
- Represented North Shore from 1920 to 1927.
- Chairman of the 1923 Royal Commission on Lunacy Law and Administration; and, as a eugenicist, recommended special training and institutions for "defectives".
- Represented Mosman from 1927 to 1932, and was Minister for Public Health from 1927 to 1930 during the Bavin Government, but failed to carry a mental defectives bill.

== Death ==
Arthur, who had been "very ill for the past few months", died in Mosman, New South Wales on 21 May 1932.

== See also ==
- Origins of the Country Women's Association

== Footnotes ==
New South Wales Legislative Assembly
New district	Member for Middle Harbour; 1904 – 1920	District abolished
New district	Member for North Shore; 1920 – 1927; With: Cocks/Kay/Tonge, Murphy, Reid/Fell, Weaver/Reid	District abolished
New district	Member for Mosman; 1927 – 1932	Succeeded by Herbert Lloyd
Political offices
Preceded by Robert Stuart-Robertson	Minister for Public Health; 1927 – 1930	Succeeded by James McGirr as Minister for Health
