= Electoral district of Arncliffe =

Former state electoral district of New South Wales, Australia

Arncliffe was an electoral district of the Legislative Assembly in the Australian state of New South Wales, created in 1930, partly replacing St George, and named after and including the Sydney suburb of Arncliffe. It was abolished in 1941 and partly replaced by Cook's River.

== Members for Arncliffe ==
| Member | Party | Term |
|---|---|---|
| Joseph Cahill | Labor | 1930–1932 |
| Horace Harper | United Australia | 1932–1935 |
| Joseph Cahill | Labor (NSW) | 1935–1938 |
| Joseph Cahill | Labor | 1935–1941 |

== See also ==
- Electoral results for the district of Arncliffe
