= Edward Hocking =

Australian politician

Edward John Hocking (9 September 1874 – 23 May 1944) was an Australian politician.

He was born at Waterloo in Sydney to storekeeper Francis Hocking and Louisa, née Collins. He attended Cleveland Street Public School and established Hocking Brothers, a building and contracting firm, in 1898, eventually becoming a significant employer. On 10 March 1902 he married Ethel Westacott at Pyrmont, with whom he had four children. He became director of the Canterbury Brick Company, the Master Builders' Insurance Company and Hocking Indestructible Water Heater Company, and was also president of the Canterbury-Bankstown branch of the Master Builders Association from 1919 to 1928. In 1932 he was elected to the New South Wales Legislative Assembly as the United Australia Party member for Canterbury; he was defeated in 1935. Hocking died at Camperdown in 1944.

New South Wales Legislative Assembly
Preceded by Arthur Tonge	Member for Canterbury; 1932–1935	Succeeded by Arthur Tonge
