= Alfred Reid (Australian politician) =

Australian politician

Alfred Albert Edward Ernest Theodore Muswellbrooke Orlando Vassa Reid (1867 – 5 August 1945), nicknamed Alphabet Reid, was an Australian politician.

He was born in Penrith to Michael and Ann Clara Reid. He became a baker, and in 1898 married Mary Ann Robertson. He served on Penrith Municipal Council from 1895 to 1898 and was mayor in 1898, and after moving to Manly around 1907 served on Manly Council from 1915 and 1928 (mayor from 1919 to 1921). In 1920 he was elected to the New South Wales Legislative Assembly as one of the members for North Shore; he was initially an independent, but subsequently joined the Nationalist Party. He did not stand for election in 1922 and was re-elected in 1925. In 1927, when single-member electorates were re-introduced, he became the member for Manly. He lost Democratic preselection for the 1944 state election and ran successfully as an independent Democrat. He joined the Liberal Party in 1945 but died later that year at Manly.

== See also ==
- Members of the New South Wales Legislative Assembly
- 1920–1922
- 1925–1927
- 1927–1930
- 1930–1932
- 1932–1935
- 1935–1938
- 1938–1941
- 1941–1944
- 1944–1947
- Results of New South Wales state elections
- 1917 (Middle Harbour)
- 1920 (North Shore)
- 1925 (North Shore)
- 1927 (Manly)
- 1930 (Manly)
- 1932 (Manly)
- 1935 (Manly)
- 1938 (Manly)
- 1941 (Manly)
- 1944 (Manly)

Civic offices
Preceded by William Fulton	Mayor of Penrith; 1898	Succeeded by William Player
Preceded by Francis William Heaton	Mayor of Manly; 1919 – 1921	Succeeded by Francis William Heaton
New South Wales Legislative Assembly
Preceded by New seat	Member for North Shore; 1920–1922; Served alongside: Arthur, Cocks, Murphy, Weaver	Succeeded by William Fell
Preceded by Reginald Weaver	Member for North Shore; 1925–1927; Served alongside: Arthur, Fell, Kay/Tonge, Murphy	Succeeded by Seat abolished
Preceded by New seat	Member for Manly; 1927–1945	Succeeded by Douglas Darby
