= Arthur Tonge =

Australian politician

Arthur Tonge MLA

Member of the New South Wales Legislative Assembly for Canterbury
- In office 11 May 1935 – 5 February 1962
- Preceded by: Edward Hocking
- Succeeded by: Kevin Stewart
- In office 8 October 1927 – 11 June 1932
- Preceded by: New seat
- Succeeded by: Edward Hocking

Member of the New South Wales Legislative Assembly for North Shore
- In office 22 September 1926 – 7 September 1927
- Preceded by: Alick Kay
- Succeeded by: Seat abolished

Personal details
- Born: 18 December 1887 Glebe, New South Wales
- Died: 1 June 1963 (aged 75) Sydney
- Party: Labor Party Australian Labor Party (NSW) Australian Labor Party (Non-Communist)

Arthur Tonge (18 December 1887 – 1 June 1963) was an Australian politician and a member of the New South Wales Legislative Assembly between 1926 and 1932 and from 1935 to 1962. He was variously a member of the Labor Party (ALP), the Australian Labor Party (NSW) and the Australian Labor Party (Non-Communist)

== Personal life ==
Tonge was born in Glebe, New South Wales, the son of a broker, and was educated to intermediate level. He worked as a newspaper clerk and became the secretary of the Federated Clerks' Union. He was involved in community groups including the Royal Society for the Prevention of Cruelty to Animals.

== Election to parliament ==
Tonge entered the New South Wales Parliament in highly controversial circumstances in 1926. After two unsuccessful attempts, Tonge contested the 1925 state election as the second candidate on the Labor list for the 5 member seat of North Shore. Cecil Murphy, Labor's first candidate was elected but Tonge failed to take a seat.

The result of the election, which was the last election held in New South Wales using multi-member seats and proportional representation, gave a majority of 1 to the Labor Party under premier Jack Lang. However, the Labor government could also generally count on the support of Walter Skelton of the Protestant Labor Party and Alick Kay, the independent member for North Shore. Kay's political ideology was somewhat obscure and he has been described by the Australian Dictionary of Biography as a "harmless ratbag".

To avoid by-elections under the proportional representation voting system, the Parliamentary Casual Vacancies Act ensured that retiring members were replaced by the first unsuccessful candidate from their party list in their electorate. In an attempt to make his majority more secure, Lang offered Kay the position as the consumer representative on the Metropolitan Meat Board. Kay accepted and, as this was a paid government position, he was required to resign from parliament. The method for replacing an independent member, under the act, was not completely clear but the Clerk of the Legislative Assembly ruled that as Kay had supported the government in questions of confidence and supply he could be replaced in parliament by the defeated Labor candidate for North Shore, Arthur Tonge. The reverberations from this piece of sharp political practice continued to disrupt the state Labor party for the next 15 years (see Lang Labor).

== State Parliament ==
With the end of proportional representation at the 1927 state election, Tonge successfully transferred to the relatively safe Labor seat of Canterbury, which was physically and demographically far removed from the North Shore. He lost the seat to the United Australia Party candidate, Edward Hocking by 111 votes at the 1932 landslide that swept Jack Lang and Labor from power. However he regained the seat at the next election in 1935. Tonge was a member of Lang's Australian Labor Party (NSW) when that party was estranged from the Federal Executive of the ALP between 1931 and 1936 and was also a member of Lang's short lived breakaway Australian Labor Party (Non-Communist) in 1940. He retained the seat of Canterbury until he lost ALP endorsement for the 1962 election. He then retired from public life. He was secretary of the Labor Party caucus between 1959 and 1962 but did not hold a ministerial or parliamentary position.

New South Wales Legislative Assembly
Preceded by Alick Kay	Member for North Shore; 1926–1927; Served alongside: Arthur, Murphy, Reid, Fell	Succeeded by Abolished
Preceded by re-established seat	Member for Canterbury; 1927–1932	Succeeded by Edward Hocking
Preceded by Edward Hocking	Member for Canterbury; 1935–1962	Succeeded by Kevin Stewart
