= Horace Harper =

Australian politician

Horace Edward Harper (11 June 1898 – 14 February 1970) was an Australian politician.

He was born in Sydney to casual hand Horace Edward Harper and Rachael, née Gregory. He attended Sydney High School and the University of Sydney; while studying at the latter, he enlisted in the Australian Imperial Force in 1917 and served in the 55th Battalion. After returning from the war he travelled to England to study at King's College London, qualifying as an accountant in 1922. On 2 September 1922 he married Rose Pierpoint in London, with whom he had four children. He returned to Australia to work for the Australian Consolidated Industries.

In 1932, Harper was elected to the New South Wales Legislative Assembly as the United Australia Party member for Arncliffe. He was defeated in 1935. From 1943 to 1949 he was general manager of Griffith Cannery, and from 1952 he became a newsagent, with stores in South Hurstville and Punchbowl. An active Freemason, Harper served as Grand Master of the Grand Lodge of New South Wales and remained active in the local community. He died at Glenfield in 1970.

New South Wales Legislative Assembly
Preceded by Joseph Cahill	Member for Arncliffe; 1932–1935	Succeeded by Joseph Cahill
