= Electoral results for the Division of North Sydney =

Australian division election results

This is a list of electoral results for the Division of North Sydney in Australian federal elections from the electorate's creation in 1901 until 2022. The division was abolished in 2025.

== Members ==
Member	Party	Term
Dugald Thomson	Free Trade	1901–1910
George Edwards	Liberal	1910–1911
Granville Ryrie	Liberal	1911 by–1916
Granville Ryrie	Nationalist	1916–1922
Billy Hughes	Nationalist	1922–1929
Billy Hughes	Independent Nationalist	1929–1930
Billy Hughes	Australian	1930–1931
Billy Hughes	United Australia	1931–1945
Billy Hughes	Liberal	1945–1949
William Jack	Liberal	1949–1966
Bill Graham	Liberal	1966–1980
John Spender	Liberal	1980–1990
Ted Mack	Independent	1990–1996
Joe Hockey	Liberal	1996–2015
Trent Zimmerman	Liberal	2015-2022
Kylea Tink	Independent	2022–2025

== Election results ==
=== Elections in the 2020s ===
==== 2022 ====
2022 Australian federal election: North Sydney
Party	Candidate	Votes	%	±%
Liberal	Trent Zimmerman	36,956	38.05	−13.91
Independent	Kylea Tink	24,477	25.20	+25.20
Labor	Catherine Renshaw	20,835	21.45	−3.63
Greens	Heather Armstrong	8,308	8.55	−5.07
United Australia	Robert Nalbandian	1,730	1.78	+0.49
Sustainable Australia	William Bourke	1,163	1.20	−0.69
One Nation	Michael Walls	1,149	1.18	+1.18
Liberal Democrats	Dajen Tinkler	1,123	1.16	+1.16
TNL	Victor Kline	886	0.91	+0.91
Informed Medical Options	Lesley Kinney	491	0.51	+0.51
Total formal votes		97,118	94.98	−0.98
Informal votes		5,138	5.02	+0.98
Turnout		102,256	91.55	−0.85
Notional two-party-preferred count
Liberal	Trent Zimmerman	49,781	51.26	−8.01
Labor	Catherine Renshaw	47,337	48.74	+8.01
Two-candidate-preferred result
Independent	Kylea Tink	51,392	52.92	+52.92
Liberal	Trent Zimmerman	45,726	47.08	−12.19
Independent gain from Liberal				

Alluvial diagram for preference flows in the seat of North Sydney in the 2022 federal election. indicates at what stage the winning candidate had over 50% of the votes and was declared the winner.

=== Elections in the 2010s ===
==== 2019 ====
2019 Australian federal election: North Sydney
Party	Candidate	Votes	%	±%
Liberal	Trent Zimmerman	50,319	51.96	+0.47
Labor	Brett Stone	24,289	25.08	+8.28
Greens	Daniel Keogh	13,193	13.62	+0.60
Independent	Arthur Chesterfield-Evans	4,295	4.44	+4.44
Sustainable Australia	Greg Graham	1,831	1.89	+1.89
Christian Democrats	David Vernon	1,660	1.71	−0.34
United Australia	Peter Vagg	1,249	1.29	+1.29
Total formal votes		96,836	95.96	+0.72
Informal votes		4,077	4.04	−0.72
Turnout		100,913	92.40	+1.69
Two-party-preferred result
Liberal	Trent Zimmerman	57,398	59.27	−4.34
Labor	Brett Stone	39,438	40.73	+4.34
Liberal hold		Swing	−4.34	

==== 2016 ====
2016 Australian federal election: North Sydney
Party	Candidate	Votes	%	±%
Liberal	Trent Zimmerman	47,614	51.49	−9.42
Labor	Peter Hayes	15,537	16.80	−3.22
Greens	Arthur Chesterfield-Evans	12,036	13.02	−2.50
Independent	Stephen Ruff	11,829	12.79	+12.79
Christian Democrats	Sharon Martin	1,894	2.05	+1.08
Science	James Coffey	1,629	1.76	+1.76
Liberal Democrats	Daniel Leahy	1,289	1.39	+1.39
Family First	Eddy Ku	649	0.70	+0.70
Total formal votes		92,477	95.24	+0.59
Informal votes		4,623	4.76	−0.59
Turnout		97,100	90.71	−1.54
Two-party-preferred result
Liberal	Trent Zimmerman	58,825	63.61	−2.10
Labor	Peter Hayes	33,652	36.39	+2.10
Liberal hold		Swing	−2.10	

==== 2015 by-election ====
2015 North Sydney by-election
Party	Candidate	Votes	%	±%
Liberal	Trent Zimmerman	36,690	48.20	−12.84
Independent	Stephen Ruff	14,303	18.79	+18.79
Greens	Arthur Chesterfield-Evans	11,959	15.71	+0.36
Independent	Maryann Beregi	2,613	3.43	+3.43
Sustainable Population	William Bourke	2,189	2.88	+2.88
Christian Democrats	Silvana Nero	1,917	2.52	+1.51
Liberal Democrats	Sam Kennard	1,591	2.09	+2.09
Arts	Lou Pollard	1,400	1.84	+1.84
Bullet Train	Tim Bohm	964	1.27	+1.27
Voluntary Euthanasia	Kerry Bromson	815	1.07	+1.07
Cyclists	Luke Freeman	815	1.07	+1.07
Future	James Jansson	513	0.67	+0.67
Palmer United	Robert Marks	352	0.46	−1.23
Total formal votes		76,121	93.08	−1.54
Informal votes		5,658	6.92	+1.54
Turnout		81,779	78.37	−13.88
Two-candidate-preferred result
Liberal	Trent Zimmerman	45,848	60.23	−5.66
Independent	Stephen Ruff	30,273	39.77	+39.77
Liberal hold		Swing	N/A	

==== 2013 ====
2013 Australian federal election: North Sydney
Party	Candidate	Votes	%	±%
Liberal	Joe Hockey	53,991	61.04	+1.33
Labor	Peter Hayes	17,727	20.04	−2.08
Greens	Alison Haines	13,579	15.35	−0.18
Palmer United	Raheam Khan	1,493	1.69	+1.69
Christian Democrats	Maureen Guthrie	892	1.01	+1.01
Democratic Labour	Angus McCaffrey	766	0.87	+0.87
Total formal votes		88,448	94.62	−0.94
Informal votes		5,031	5.38	+0.94
Turnout		93,479	92.26	+0.34
Two-party-preferred result
Liberal	Joe Hockey	58,274	65.89	+1.83
Labor	Peter Hayes	30,174	34.11	−1.83
Liberal hold		Swing	+1.83	

==== 2010 ====
2010 Australian federal election: North Sydney
Party	Candidate	Votes	%	±%
Liberal	Joe Hockey	51,179	59.71	+7.94
Labor	Leta Webb	18,961	22.12	−13.15
Greens	Andrew Robjohns	13,314	15.53	+5.97
Democrats	Daniel Pearce	1,275	1.49	+1.45
Family First	Daniel Le	980	1.14	+0.64
Total formal votes		85,709	95.56	−0.72
Informal votes		3,986	4.44	+0.72
Turnout		89,695	91.93	−2.28
Two-party-preferred result
Liberal	Joe Hockey	54,901	64.06	+8.55
Labor	Leta Webb	30,808	35.94	−8.55
Liberal hold		Swing	+8.55	

=== Elections in the 2000s ===
==== 2007 ====
2007 Australian federal election: North Sydney
Party	Candidate	Votes	%	±%
Liberal	Joe Hockey	44,177	51.81	−4.42
Labor	Mike Bailey	30,372	35.62	+8.35
Greens	Ted Nixon	7,851	9.21	−3.12
Climate Change	Barry Thompson	1,119	1.31	+1.31
Christian Democrats	Arie Baalbergen	621	0.73	+0.73
Independent	Marcus Aussie-Stone	526	0.62	+0.62
Family First	John Cafferatta	352	0.41	+0.39
Citizens Electoral Council	Kundan Misra	245	0.29	+0.29
Total formal votes		85,263	96.53	+0.19
Informal votes		3,061	3.47	−0.19
Turnout		88,324	93.80	+0.18
Two-party-preferred result
Liberal	Joe Hockey	47,222	55.38	−4.66
Labor	Mike Bailey	38,041	44.62	+4.66
Liberal hold		Swing	−4.66	

==== 2004 ====
2004 Australian federal election: North Sydney
Party	Candidate	Votes	%	±%
Liberal	Joe Hockey	45,105	56.24	−0.72
Labor	Fran Teirney	21,864	27.26	+2.79
Greens	Ted Nixon	9,890	12.33	+4.67
Independent	Edwina Mary Cowdery	1,884	2.35	+2.35
Democrats	Jan de Voogd	1,456	1.82	−6.44
Total formal votes		80,199	96.35	+0.37
Informal votes		3,034	3.65	−0.37
Turnout		83,233	93.43	+0.71
Two-party-preferred result
Liberal	Joe Hockey	48,145	60.03	−3.19
Labor	Fran Teirney	32,054	39.97	+3.19
Liberal hold		Swing	−3.19	

==== 2001 ====
2001 Australian federal election: North Sydney
Party	Candidate	Votes	%	±%
Liberal	Joe Hockey	44,995	56.96	+1.80
Labor	Fran Teirney	19,325	24.47	−1.31
Democrats	Bryan McGuire	6,528	8.26	+1.13
Greens	Mike Steel	6,053	7.66	+3.81
Christian Democrats	Colin Ward	1,227	1.55	+0.81
Unity	Brian Lam	861	1.09	−2.92
Total formal votes		78,989	95.98	−0.70
Informal votes		3,310	4.02	+0.70
Turnout		82,299	93.11	
Two-party-preferred result
Liberal	Joe Hockey	49,934	63.21	+0.55
Labor	Fran Teirney	29,055	36.79	−0.55
Liberal hold		Swing	+0.55	

=== Elections in the 1990s ===
==== 1998 ====
1998 Australian federal election: North Sydney
Party	Candidate	Votes	%	±%
Liberal	Joe Hockey	42,887	54.32	−2.97
Labor	Julie Owens	20,403	25.84	+0.57
Democrats	Anthony Spain	5,726	7.25	−2.72
Unity	Henry Pong	3,727	4.72	+4.72
Greens	Andrew Woodroffe	3,106	3.93	+0.12
One Nation	John Hockley	2,270	2.88	+2.88
Christian Democrats	Roger Bourne	698	0.88	+0.88
Natural Law	Glenn Russell	136	0.17	+0.17
Total formal votes		78,953	96.72	−0.73
Informal votes		2,676	3.28	+0.73
Turnout		81,629	93.09	−2.04
Two-party-preferred result
Liberal	Joe Hockey	49,124	62.22	−3.34
Labor	Julie Owens	29,829	37.78	+3.34
Liberal hold		Swing	−3.34	

==== 1996 ====
1996 Australian federal election: North Sydney
Party	Candidate	Votes	%	±%
Liberal	Joe Hockey	45,634	57.29	+11.35
Labor	Julie Owens	20,132	25.27	+8.28
Democrats	Linda Wade	7,947	9.98	+9.98
Greens	George Carter	3,039	3.81	+3.81
Independent	Richard Tanner	2,908	3.65	+3.65
Total formal votes		79,660	97.45	−0.51
Informal votes		2,081	2.55	+0.51
Turnout		81,741	95.14	+0.57
Two-party-preferred result
Liberal	Joe Hockey	51,851	65.56	+6.6
Labor	Julie Owens	27,244	34.44	−6.6
Liberal gain from Independent		Swing	+6.6	

The sitting member Ted Mack (Independent) did not contest the election.

==== 1993 ====
1993 Australian federal election: North Sydney
Party	Candidate	Votes	%	±%
Liberal	Bruce McNeilly	34,490	45.94	+1.69
Independent	Ted Mack	26,535	35.34	+0.99
Labor	Richard Elstone	12,759	16.99	+2.66
Independent	Stuart Carraill	877	1.17	+1.17
Natural Law	Ian Stokes	422	0.56	+0.56
Total formal votes		75,083	97.97	−0.07
Informal votes		1,559	2.03	+0.07
Turnout		76,642	94.56	
Notional two-party-preferred count
Liberal	Bruce McNeilly	44,681	59.53	−0.46
Labor	Richard Elstone	30,379	40.47	+0.46
Two-candidate-preferred result
Independent	Ted Mack	38,912	51.84	+4.8
Liberal	Bruce McNeilly	36,154	48.16	−4.8
Independent notional gain from Liberal		Swing	+4.8	

The sitting member was Ted Mack (Independent) however a redistribution gave a notional Liberal majority.

==== 1990 ====
1990 Australian federal election: North Sydney
Party	Candidate	Votes	%	±%
Independent	Ted Mack	27,116	44.5	+44.5
Liberal	John Spender	24,582	40.4	−18.1
Labor	Chrissa Loukas	7,240	11.9	−17.6
Democrats	Graeme MacLennan	1,940	3.2	−8.7
Total formal votes		60,878	98.2	
Informal votes		1,111	1.8	
Turnout		61,989	94.6	
Notional two-party-preferred count
Liberal	John Spender		58.4	−5.8
Labor	Chrissa Loukas		41.6	+5.8
Two-candidate-preferred result
Independent	Ted Mack	35,092	57.7	+57.7
Liberal	John Spender	25,772	42.3	−21.9
Independent gain from Liberal		Swing	N/A	

Ted Mack was the first independent elected to the House of Representatives since Sam Benson for Batman in 1966.

=== Elections in the 1980s ===
==== 1987 ====
1987 Australian federal election: North Sydney
Party	Candidate	Votes	%	±%
Liberal	John Spender	36,290	58.5	+1.5
Labor	Eddie Britt	18,303	29.5	−3.1
Democrats	Rod Dominish	7,396	11.9	+1.5
Total formal votes		61,989	96.2	
Informal votes		2,461	3.8	
Turnout		64,450	90.0	
Two-party-preferred result
Liberal	John Spender	39,815	64.2	+3.2
Labor	Eddie Britt	22,174	35.8	−3.2
Liberal hold		Swing	+3.2	

==== 1984 ====
1984 Australian federal election: North Sydney
Party	Candidate	Votes	%	±%
Liberal	John Spender	34,579	57.0	−1.8
Labor	Philip Kelso	19,780	32.6	−0.4
Democrats	Rod Dominish	6,331	10.4	+2.3
Total formal votes		60,690	95.0	
Informal votes		3,190	5.0	
Turnout		63,880	91.6	
Two-party-preferred result
Liberal	John Spender	37,020	61.0	−0.6
Labor	Philip Kelso	23,666	39.0	+0.6
Liberal hold		Swing	−0.6	

==== 1983 ====
1983 Australian federal election: North Sydney
Party	Candidate	Votes	%	±%
Liberal	John Spender	35,544	57.6	−2.4
Labor	Kirk McKenzie	21,096	34.2	+3.0
Democrats	Rodney Dominish	5,024	8.1	+2.3
Total formal votes		61,664	98.1	
Informal votes		1,214	1.9	
Turnout		62,878	92.1	
Two-party-preferred result
Liberal	John Spender		60.4	−4.1
Labor	Kirk McKenzie		39.6	+4.1
Liberal hold		Swing	−4.1	

==== 1980 ====
1980 Australian federal election: North Sydney
Party	Candidate	Votes	%	±%
Liberal	John Spender	37,016	60.0	+1.4
Labor	Maxine Broughton	19,223	31.2	+5.0
Democrats	Anita Stiller	3,573	5.8	−5.2
Progress	Peter Corrie	1,131	1.8	−0.8
Independent	Josephine Chisholm-Mallett	737	1.2	+1.2
Total formal votes		61,680	97.8	
Informal votes		1,410	2.2	
Turnout		63,090	90.0	
Two-party-preferred result
Liberal	John Spender		64.5	−2.8
Labor	Maxine Broughton		35.5	+2.8
Liberal hold		Swing	−2.8	

=== Elections in the 1970s ===
==== 1977 ====
1977 Australian federal election: North Sydney
Party	Candidate	Votes	%	±%
Liberal	Bill Graham	38,176	58.6	−5.2
Labor	Maurice May	17,111	26.2	−6.5
Democrats	John Pierce	7,153	11.0	+11.0
Progress	Peter Corrie	1,672	2.6	−0.2
Independent	John Maher	1,073	1.6	+1.6
Total formal votes		65,185	97.7	
Informal votes		1,503	2.3	
Turnout		66,688	92.7	
Two-party-preferred result
Liberal	Bill Graham		67.3	+0.9
Labor	Maurice May		32.7	−0.9
Liberal hold		Swing	+0.9	

==== 1975 ====
1975 Australian federal election: North Sydney
Party	Candidate	Votes	%	±%
Liberal	Bill Graham	35,009	63.8	+6.9
Labor	Patrick Healy	17,959	32.7	−4.8
Workers	Peter Sawyer	1,564	2.8	+2.8
Independent	Romualds Kemps	362	0.7	+0.1
Total formal votes		54,894	98.3	
Informal votes		944	1.7	
Turnout		55,838	93.3	
Two-party-preferred result
Liberal	Bill Graham		66.4	+7.5
Labor	Patrick Healy		33.6	−7.5
Liberal hold		Swing	+7.5	

==== 1974 ====
1974 Australian federal election: North Sydney
Party	Candidate	Votes	%	±%
Liberal	Bill Graham	30,155	56.9	+6.3
Labor	Patrick Healy	19,883	37.5	+1.3
Australia	James Feros	2,609	4.9	−3.2
Independent	Romualds Kemps	326	0.6	+0.1
Total formal votes		52,973	97.8	
Informal votes		1,202	2.2	
Turnout		54,175	92.6	
Two-party-preferred result
Liberal	Bill Graham		58.9	+0.5
Labor	Patrick Healy		41.1	−0.5
Liberal hold		Swing	+0.5	

==== 1972 ====
1972 Australian federal election: North Sydney
Party	Candidate	Votes	%	±%
Liberal	Bill Graham	26,043	50.6	−6.9
Labor	Brian Maguire	18,666	36.2	+0.6
Australia	James Feros	4,197	8.1	+8.1
Democratic Labor	Michael Fitzpatrick	2,351	4.6	−0.4
Independent	Romualds Kemps	247	0.5	−1.4
Total formal votes		51,504	98.2	
Informal votes		919	1.8	
Turnout		52,423	92.1	
Two-party-preferred result
Liberal	Bill Graham		58.4	−4.1
Labor	Brian Maguire		41.6	+4.1
Liberal hold		Swing	−4.1	

=== Elections in the 1960s ===
==== 1969 ====
1969 Australian federal election: North Sydney
Party	Candidate	Votes	%	±%
Liberal	Bill Graham	29,933	57.5	−4.5
Labor	Mervyn Page	18,524	35.6	+13.4
Democratic Labor	Reginald Lawson	2,622	5.0	−1.7
Independent	Romualds Kemps	984	1.9	+1.7
Total formal votes		52,063	97.7	
Informal votes		1,206	2.3	
Turnout		53,269	91.7	
Two-party-preferred result
Liberal	Bill Graham		62.5	−8.3
Labor	Mervyn Page		37.5	+8.3
Liberal hold		Swing	−8.3	

==== 1966 ====
1966 Australian federal election: North Sydney
Party	Candidate	Votes	%	±%
Liberal	Bill Graham	21,477	59.8	+0.5
Labor	Jack Grahame	8,776	24.4	−11.0
Democratic Labor	Edmund Bateman	2,391	6.7	+1.3
Liberal Reform Group	Frederick Simpson	1,940	5.4	+5.4
Independent	Joyce Duncan	720	2.0	+2.0
Independent	Nicholas Gorshenin	391	1.1	+1.1
Independent	David Wall	161	0.4	+0.4
Independent	Romualds Kemps	62	0.2	+0.2
Total formal votes		35,918	95.5	
Informal votes		1,694	4.5	
Turnout		37,612	92.9	
Two-party-preferred result
Liberal	Bill Graham		68.6	+5.8
Labor	Jack Grahame		31.4	−5.8
Liberal hold		Swing	+5.8	

==== 1963 ====
1963 Australian federal election: North Sydney
Party	Candidate	Votes	%	±%
Liberal	William Jack	22,492	59.3	+9.6
Labor	Maurice Isaacs	13,417	35.4	−5.5
Democratic Labor	Michael Fitzpatrick	2,035	5.4	−4.0
Total formal votes		37,944	98.5	
Informal votes		575	1.5	
Turnout		38,519	94.1	
Two-party-preferred result
Liberal	William Jack		62.8	+8.8
Labor	Maurice Isaacs		37.2	−8.8
Liberal hold		Swing	+8.8	

==== 1961 ====
1961 Australian federal election: North Sydney
Party	Candidate	Votes	%	±%
Liberal	William Jack	18,959	49.7	−7.4
Labor	Maurice Isaacs	15,610	40.9	+6.7
Democratic Labor	Michael Fitzpatrick	3,575	9.4	+1.8
Total formal votes		38,144	97.9	
Informal votes		805	2.1	
Turnout		38,949	94.3	
Two-party-preferred result
Liberal	William Jack	20,608	54.0	−9.7
Labor	Maurice Isaacs	17,536	46.0	+9.7
Liberal hold		Swing	−9.7	

=== Elections in the 1950s ===
==== 1958 ====
1958 Australian federal election: North Sydney
Party	Candidate	Votes	%	±%
Liberal	William Jack	22,273	57.1	−5.2
Labor	Jack Stephens	13,344	34.2	−3.5
Democratic Labor	Gregory McGirr	2,968	7.6	+7.6
Independent	Edward McGregor	400	1.0	+1.0
Total formal votes		38,985	96.7	
Informal votes		1,336	3.3	
Turnout		40,321	94.9	
Two-party-preferred result
Liberal	William Jack		63.7	+1.4
Labor	Jack Stephens		36.3	−1.4
Liberal hold		Swing	+1.4	

==== 1955 ====
1955 Australian federal election: North Sydney
Party	Candidate	Votes	%	±%
Liberal	William Jack	25,359	62.3	+8.4
Labor	Joseph McNally	15,322	37.7	−8.4
Total formal votes		40,681	97.2	
Informal votes		1,179	2.8	
Turnout		41,860	95.1	+8.4
Liberal hold		Swing	+8.4	

==== 1954 ====
1954 Australian federal election: North Sydney
Party	Candidate	Votes	%	±%
Liberal	William Jack	19,780	53.9	−4.1
Labor	Leo Haylen	16,916	46.1	+4.1
Total formal votes		36,696	98.7	
Informal votes		486	1.3	
Turnout		37,182	95.7	
Liberal hold		Swing	−4.1	

==== 1951 ====
1951 Australian federal election: North Sydney
Party	Candidate	Votes	%	±%
Liberal	William Jack	22,110	58.0	+7.1
Labor	Eileen Powell	15,984	42.0	+0.3
Total formal votes		38,094	98.3	
Informal votes		643	1.7	
Turnout		38,737	96.4	
Liberal hold		Swing	+4.7	

=== Elections in the 1940s ===
==== 1949 ====
1949 Australian federal election: North Sydney
Party	Candidate	Votes	%	±%
Liberal	William Jack	19,650	50.9	+3.3
Labor	Leo Haylen	16,094	41.7	−10.7
Independent	Patrick Williams	1,642	4.3	+4.3
Lang Labor	Norman Ferguson	1,642	3.1	+3.1
Total formal votes		38,591	97.9	
Informal votes		831	2.1	
Turnout		39,422	97.6	
Two-party-preferred result
Liberal	William Jack		53.3	+5.7
Labor	Leo Haylen		46.7	−5.7
Liberal gain from Labor		Swing	+5.7	

==== 1946 ====
1946 Australian federal election: North Sydney
Party	Candidate	Votes	%	±%
Liberal	Billy Hughes	40,845	55.9	+11.8
Labor	Leo Haylen	32,247	44.1	+8.4
Total formal votes		73,092	98.0	
Informal votes		1,503	2.0	
Turnout		74,595	96.1	
Liberal hold		Swing	+2.8	

==== 1943 ====
1943 Australian federal election: North Sydney
Party	Candidate	Votes	%	±%
United Australia	Billy Hughes	29,962	44.1	−17.2
Labor	Leo Haylen	24,989	35.7	+20.2
Independent	Patrick Williams	6,132	9.0	+9.0
Independent	Eric Bentley	3,349	4.9	+4.9
Communist	Jack Miles	2,821	4.2	+4.2
One Parliament	Jack Lewis	938	1.4	+1.4
Independent	Oliver Partington	455	0.7	+0.7
Total formal votes		67,946	95.3	
Informal votes		3,323	4.7	
Turnout		71,269	98.4	
Two-party-preferred result
United Australia	Billy Hughes	36,066	53.1	−14.5
Labor	Leo Haylen	31,880	46.9	+46.9
United Australia hold		Swing	−14.5	

==== 1940 ====
1940 Australian federal election: North Sydney
Party	Candidate	Votes	%	±%
United Australia	Billy Hughes	38,381	61.3	−4.6
State Labor	William Wilson	10,965	17.5	+17.5
Labor	James Dooley	9,704	15.5	−12.4
Labor (N-C)	John Steel	3,526	5.6	+5.6
Total formal votes		62,576	98.2	
Informal votes		1,170	1.8	
Turnout		63,746	95.5	
Two-party-preferred result
United Australia	Billy Hughes		67.6	−1.4
State Labor	William Wilson		32.4	+32.4
United Australia hold		Swing	−1.4	

=== Elections in the 1930s ===
==== 1937 ====
1937 Australian federal election: North Sydney
Party	Candidate	Votes	%	±%
United Australia	Billy Hughes	38,386	65.9	+0.8
Labor	Henry Clayden	16,254	27.9	+27.9
Social Credit	Percival Minahan	3,568	6.1	−5.6
Total formal votes		58,208	97.7	
Informal votes		1,344	2.3	
Turnout		59,552	97.2	
Two-party-preferred result
United Australia	Billy Hughes		69.0	−2.0
Labor	Henry Clayden		31.0	+31.0
United Australia hold		Swing	−2.0	

==== 1934 ====
1934 Australian federal election: North Sydney
Party	Candidate	Votes	%	±%
United Australia	Billy Hughes	35,532	65.1	−12.2
Labor (NSW)	Stan Taylor	12,684	23.2	+0.6
Social Credit	Vincent Kelly	6,385	11.7	+11.7
Total formal votes		54,601	98.0	
Informal votes		1,112	2.0	
Turnout		55,713	96.0	
Two-party-preferred result
United Australia	Billy Hughes		71.0	+13.5
Labor (NSW)	Stan Taylor		29.0	+29.0
United Australia hold		Swing	+13.5	

==== 1931 ====
1931 Australian federal election: North Sydney
Party	Candidate	Votes	%	±%
United Australia	Billy Hughes	22,317	40.8	+1.3
United Australia	Norman Cowper	19,724	36.0	+36.0
Labor (NSW)	Norman Nelson	12,696	23.2	+23.2
Total formal votes		54,737	98.3	
Informal votes		920	1.7	
Turnout		55,657	94.2	
Two-party-preferred result
United Australia	Billy Hughes		57.5	+23.6
United Australia	Norman Cowper		42.5	+42.5
United Australia gain from Independent		Swing	+23.6	

=== Elections in the 1920s ===
==== 1929 ====
1929 Australian federal election: North Sydney
Party	Candidate	Votes	%	±%
Ind. Nationalist	Billy Hughes	33,263	61.2	+61.2
Nationalist	Lewis Nott	20,298	37.3	−28.9
Independent Labor	Clifford Banks	618	1.1	+1.1
Socialist Labor	Ernie Judd	180	0.3	+0.3
Total formal votes		54,359	97.9	
Informal votes		1,169	2.1	
Turnout		55,528	95.7	
Two-party-preferred result
Ind. Nationalist	Billy Hughes		66.1	+66.1
Nationalist	Lewis Nott		33.9	−32.3
Ind. Nationalist gain from Nationalist		Swing	+32.3	

==== 1928 ====
1928 Australian federal election: North Sydney
Party	Candidate	Votes	%	±%
Nationalist	Billy Hughes	32,734	66.2	−5.3
Labor	Ben Howe	16,736	33.8	+5.3
Total formal votes		49,470	94.8	
Informal votes		2,718	5.2	
Turnout		52,188	94.6	
Nationalist hold		Swing	−5.3	

==== 1925 ====
1925 Australian federal election: North Sydney
Party	Candidate	Votes	%	±%
Nationalist	Billy Hughes	33,855	71.5	+13.3
Labor	Joe Lamaro	13,500	28.5	+28.5
Total formal votes		47,355	98.8	
Informal votes		581	1.2	
Turnout		47,936	92.9	
Nationalist hold		Swing	+13.3	

==== 1922 ====
1922 Australian federal election: North Sydney
Party	Candidate	Votes	%	±%
Nationalist	Billy Hughes	16,475	58.2	−11.2
Constitutionalist	Albert Piddington	11,812	41.8	+41.8
Total formal votes		28,287	97.3	
Informal votes		775	2.7	
Turnout		29,062	65.5	
Nationalist hold		Swing	−11.2	

=== Elections in the 1910s ===
==== 1919 ====
1919 Australian federal election: North Sydney
Party	Candidate	Votes	%	±%
Nationalist	Sir Granville Ryrie	26,438	75.5	−24.5
Labor	Cecil Murphy	8,558	24.5	+24.5
Total formal votes		34,996	98.2	
Informal votes		643	1.8	
Turnout		35,639	66.9	
Nationalist hold		Swing	−24.5	

==== 1917 ====
1917 Australian federal election: North Sydney
Party	Candidate	Votes	%	±%
Nationalist	Granville Ryrie	unopposed		
Nationalist hold		Swing		

==== 1914 ====
1914 Australian federal election: North Sydney
Party	Candidate	Votes	%	±%
Liberal	Granville Ryrie	19,810	67.6	−1.5
Labor	Roland Bradley	9,507	32.4	+1.5
Total formal votes		29,317	97.2	
Informal votes		853	2.8	
Turnout		30,170	63.7	
Liberal hold		Swing	−1.5	

==== 1913 ====
1913 Australian federal election: North Sydney
Party	Candidate	Votes	%	±%
Liberal	Granville Ryrie	21,639	69.1	+1.8
Labor	Martin Shannon	9,659	30.9	−0.5
Total formal votes		31,298	95.4	
Informal votes		1,511	4.6	
Turnout		32,809	73.2	
Liberal hold		Swing	+1.1	

==== 1911 by-election ====
1911 North Sydney by-election
Party	Candidate	Votes	%	±%
Liberal	Granville Ryrie	11,687	72.48	+7.32
Labour	Stephen O'Brien	4,437	27.52	−6.06
Total formal votes		16,124	99.47	+0.74
Informal votes		86	0.53	−0.74
Registered electors		39,550		
Turnout		16,210	40.99	−20.51
Liberal hold		Swing	+7.32	

==== 1910 ====
1910 Australian federal election: North Sydney
Party	Candidate	Votes	%	±%
Liberal	George Edwards	15,233	65.2	−34.8
Labour	Percy Tighe	7,850	33.6	+33.6
Young Australia	John Steel	294	1.3	+1.3
Total formal votes		23,377	98.7	
Informal votes		300	1.3	
Turnout		23,677	61.5	
Liberal hold		Swing	−33.6	

=== Elections in the 1900s ===
==== 1906 ====
1906 Australian federal election: North Sydney
Party	Candidate	Votes	%	±%
Anti-Socialist	Dugald Thomson	unopposed		
Anti-Socialist hold		Swing		

==== 1903 ====
1903 Australian federal election: North Sydney
Party	Candidate	Votes	%	±%
Free Trade	Dugald Thomson	unopposed		
Free Trade hold		Swing		

==== 1901 ====
1901 Australian federal election: North Sydney
Party	Candidate	Votes	%	±%
Free Trade	Dugald Thomson	6,584	60.4	+60.4
Ind. Free Trade	Edward Clark	4,315	39.6	+39.6
Total formal votes		10,899	98.7	
Informal votes		145	1.3	
Turnout		11,044	73.1	
Free Trade win		(new seat)		
