= North Sydney by-election =

North Sydney by-election may refer to one of two elections for the Australian House of Representatives seat of North Sydney:

- 1911 North Sydney by-election
- 2015 North Sydney by-election
