= 1988 North Shore state by-election =

Election result for North Shore, New South Wales, Australia

A by-election was held for the New South Wales Legislative Assembly electorate of North Shore on 5 November 1988 because of the resignation of Ted Mack (Independent), shortly before he became entitled to a parliamentary pension.

The North Shore by-election was held the same day as the Port Stephens by-election.

== Dates ==
Date	Event
16 September 1988	Resignation of Ted Mack.
17 October 1988	Writ of election issued by the Speaker of the Legislative Assembly.
21 October 1988	Nominations
5 November 1988	Polling day
25 November 1988	Return of writ

== Results ==
1988 North Shore by-election Saturday 5 November
Party	Candidate	Votes	%	±%
Independent	Robyn Read	11,523	51.8	
Liberal	Jillian Skinner	7,913	35.6	−1.5
Labor	Kirk McKenzie	1,625	7.3	
Democrats	Burnum Burnum	718	3.2	
Nuclear Disarmament	Robert Wood	462	2.1	
Total formal votes		22,241	98.2	+0.2
Informal votes		402	1.8	−0.2
Turnout		22,643	70.1	−19.1
Two-candidate-preferred result
Independent	Robyn Read	13,838	63.0	
Liberal	Jillian Skinner	8,129	37.0	−3.1 (Note: compared to the two-candidate-preferred result for the 1988 North Shore election.)
Independent hold		Swing		

== See also ==
- Electoral results for the district of North Shore
- List of New South Wales state by-elections
