= 1994 North Shore state by-election =

- 5 February 1994

Electoral district of North Shore in the New South Wales Legislative Assembly
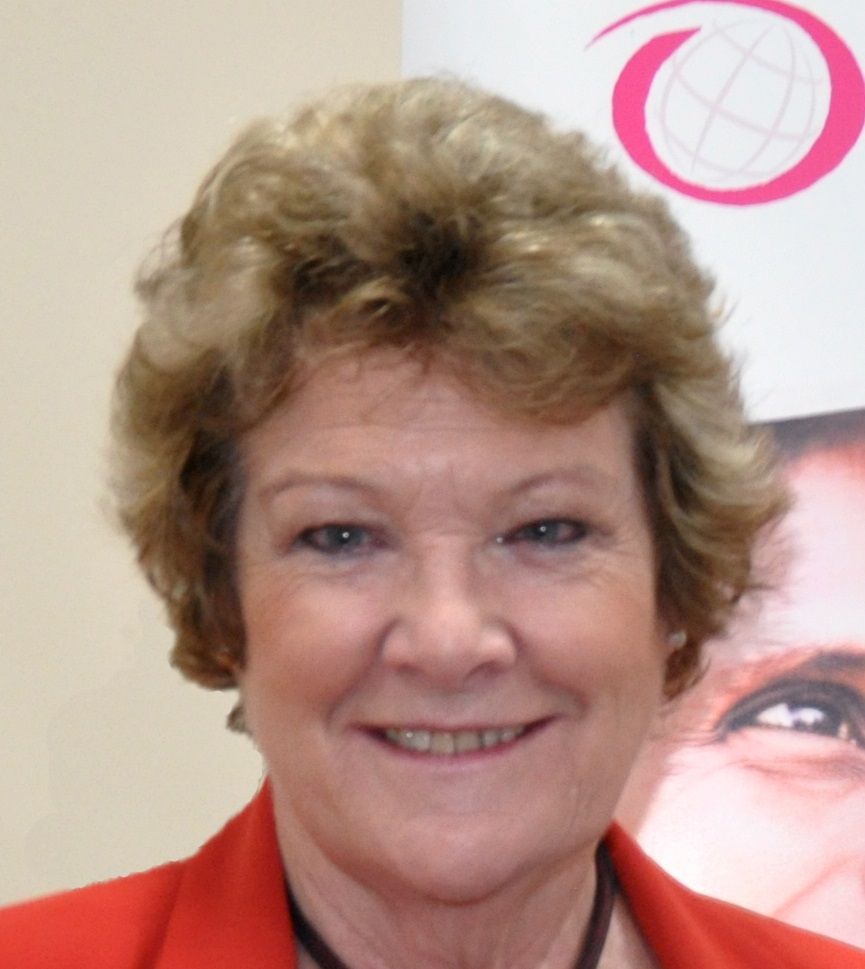
	First party	Second party
		IND
Candidate	Jillian Skinner	Robyn Read
Party	Liberal	Independent
Primary vote	15,267	10,408
Percentage	54.7%	37.3%
Swing	▲3.6	▼3.8
TCP	58.4%	41.6%
TCP swing	▲5.9	▼5.9
MP before election
Phillip Smiles
Liberal
Elected MP
Jillian Skinner
Liberal

A by-election was held in the state electoral district of North Shore on 5 February 1994. The by-election was triggered by the resignation of Liberal Party MP Phillip Smiles.

== Dates ==
Date	Event
21 December 1993	Resignation of Phillip Smiles.
18 January 1994	Writ of election issued by the Speaker of the Legislative Assembly.
20 January 1994	Day of nomination
5 February 1994	Polling day
18 February 1994	Return of writ

== Results ==
1994 North Shore by-election Saturday 5 February
Party	Candidate	Votes	%	±%
Liberal	Jillian Skinner	15,267	54.7	+3.6
Independent	Robyn Read	10,408	37.3	−3.8
Independent	Gerry Nolan	878	3.1	
Independent	Jim Reid	787	2.8	
Democrats	Alec Cater	590	2.1	
Total formal votes		27,930	98.3	+3.9
Informal votes		473	1.7	−3.9
Turnout		28,403	76.0	−14.2
Two-candidate-preferred result
Liberal	Jillian Skinner	15,905	58.4	+5.9
Independent	Robyn Read	11,338	41.6	−5.9
Liberal hold		Swing	+5.9	

The Labor Party did not nominate a candidate.

== See also ==
- Electoral results for the district of North Shore
- List of New South Wales state by-elections
