= 2015 North Sydney by-election =

- 5 December 2015

Division of North Sydney (NSW) in the House of Representatives
- Registered: 104,352
- Turnout: 78.37% (▼13.88)
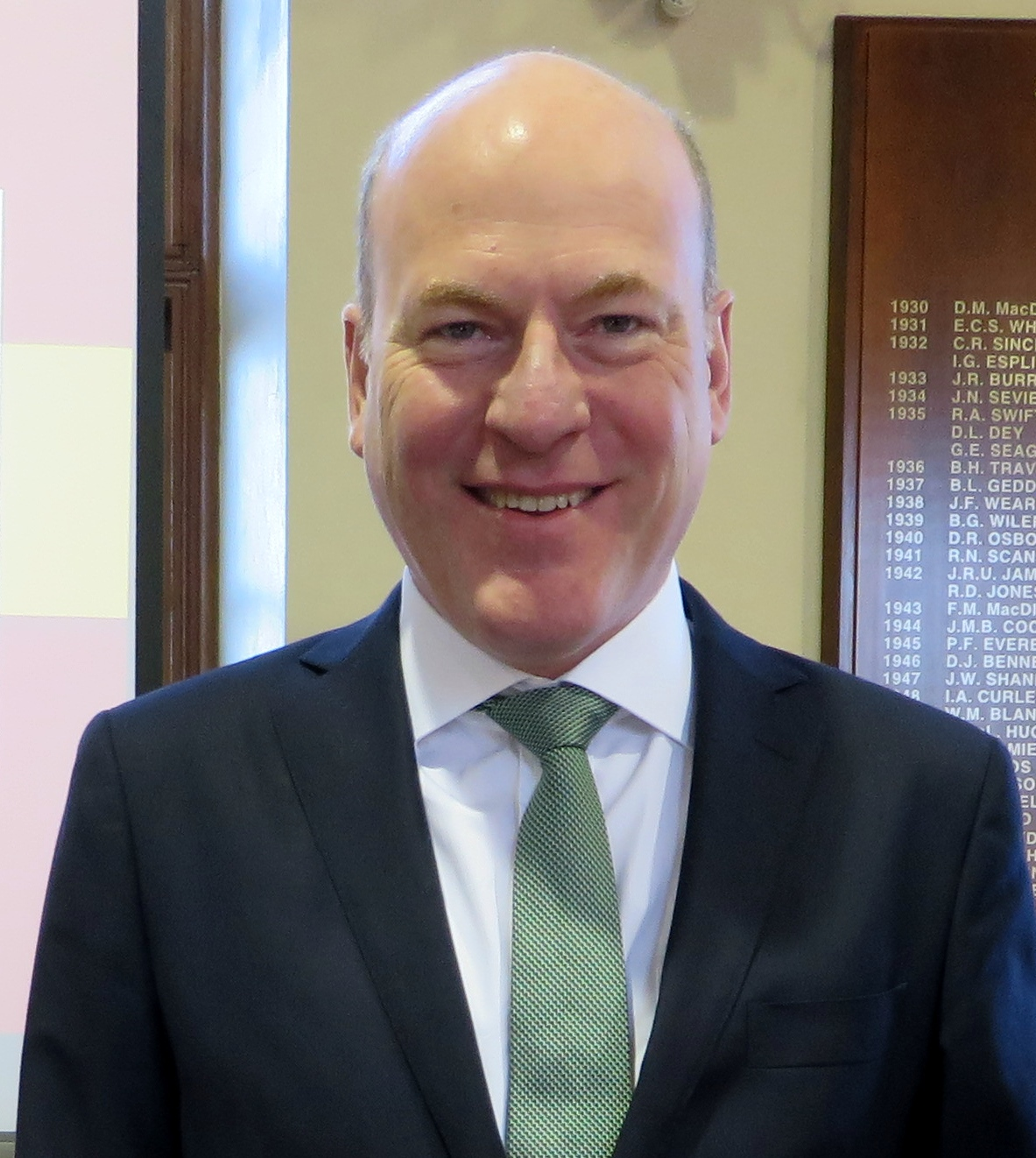

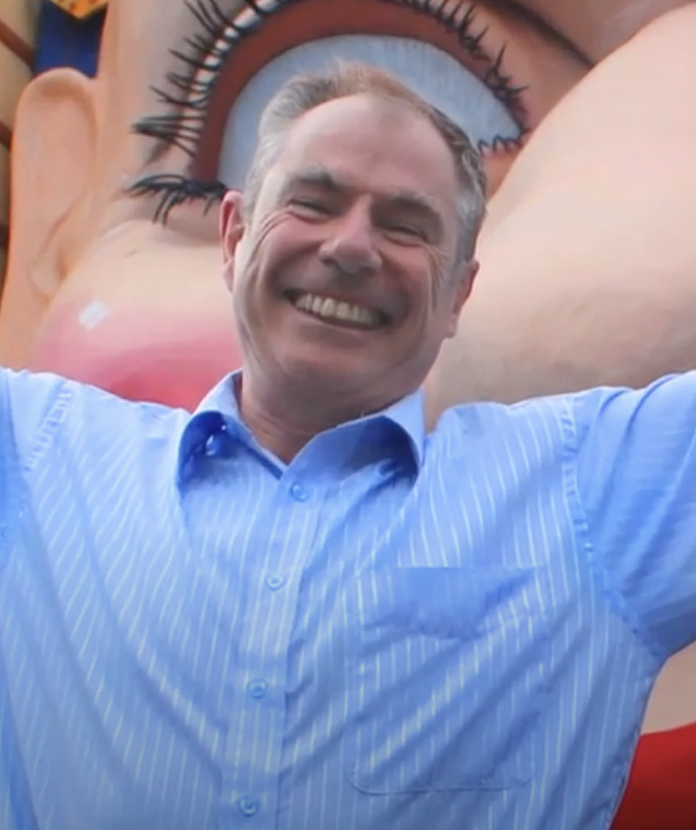
	First party	Second party	Third party
		IND
Candidate	Trent Zimmerman	Stephen Ruff	Arthur; Chesterfield-Evans
Party	Liberal	Independent	Greens
Primary vote	36,690	14,303	11,959
Percentage	48.20%	18.79%	15.71%
Swing	▼12.84	▲18.79	▲0.36
TCP	60.23%	39.77%
TCP swing	▼5.66	▲39.77
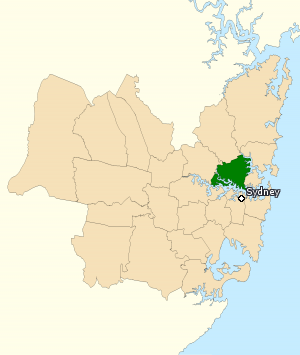
- The Division of North Sydney covers 53 km² of Sydney's lower north shore.
MP before election
Joe Hockey
Liberal
Elected MP
Trent Zimmerman
Liberal

The 2015 North Sydney by-election was held on 5 December 2015 to elect the member for North Sydney in the Australian House of Representatives.

The trigger for the by-election was the 23 October parliamentary resignation of Joe Hockey, the backbench Liberal Member for North Sydney and former Abbott Coalition government Treasurer.

House of Representatives Speaker Tony Smith issued the writ for the by-election on 26 October. The electoral roll containing 104,352 electors closed on 2 November. Candidate nominations closed on 12 November, and the draw of the ballot paper order occurred on 13 November.

The by-election was won by Liberal candidate Trent Zimmerman, a former Hockey staffer, whose pre-selection had been controversial. Zimmerman won with 48.2 percent of the primary vote after a larger-than-predicted 12.8 percent swing against the Turnbull Coalition government. This was only the second time in North Sydney's history that the successful Liberal candidate did not obtain over 50 percent of the primary (first preference) vote and had to rely on preferences, the other time was in the 1961 general election. Zimmerman faced a double-digit primary vote swing − more than triple that of the 2015 Canning by-election − despite the absence of a Labor candidate. Labor have never been successful in the safe Liberal seat.

The Liberal two-candidate vote of 60.2 percent against independent Stephen Ruff compares to the previous election vote of 65.9 percent against Labor. The reduction of 5.7 percent cannot be considered a "two-party/candidate preferred swing" − when a major party is absent, preference flows to both major parties does not take place, resulting in asymmetric preference flows.

Ian Macfarlane attempted to defect from the Liberal party room to the National party room with accompanying demands for additional Nationals cabinet representation, and the Mal Brough / James Ashby diary controversy deepened in the last week of the campaign. Along with the unexpected by-election swing and Turnbull's significantly lessened personal ratings in the concurrent December Newspoll led journalists at several news outlets to opine Malcolm Turnbull's honeymoon to be over.

Zimmerman became the first openly-LGBTI member of the House of Representatives.

== Candidates ==
Candidates are listed in the order they appeared on the ballot.

Party	Candidate	Background
Arts	Lou Pollard	Arts activist, comedian, actor, writer and clown doctor.
Sustainable Population	William Bourke	Party founder and president. Principal partner in a national marketing business.
Liberal Democrats	Sam Kennard	Managing director of Kennards Self Storage
Voluntary Euthanasia	Kerry Bromson	Party convenor.
Future	James Jansson	Party leader.
Greens	Arthur Chesterfield-Evans	Medical doctor. Democrats member of the NSW Legislative Council from 1998 to 2007.
Independent	Maryann Beregi	Councillor on North Sydney Council.
Christian Democrats	Silvana Nero	Perennial candidate. Italian language teacher. Second wife of party leader Fred Nile.
Palmer United	Robert Marks	Company director, auctioneer and real estate agent. Candidate for Bennelong at the 2013 federal election.
Liberal	Trent Zimmerman	Acting party president of the NSW division. Former Joe Hockey staffer.
Independent	Stephen Ruff	Senior orthopaedic surgeon at Royal North Shore Hospital. Backed by former independent North Sydney MP Ted Mack.
Cyclists	Luke Freeman	Digital marketer, volunteers with not-for-profit organisations.
Bullet Train	Tim Bohm	Party president. Candidate for Molonglo at the 2012 ACT election and the Senate in NSW at the 2013 federal election.

Labor declined to field a candidate in the safe Liberal seat.

== By-election events ==
The campaign began amid claims of "widespread discontent for the Liberal pre-selection factional fix of Trent Zimmerman" and in the absence of a Labor candidate. Hockey's predecessor, former independent North Sydney MP Ted Mack, announced he would steer the campaign of independent candidate Stephen Ruff, who had the support of some disgruntled Liberal supporters. Ruff was a late entrant into the 2015 New South Wales state election. Despite having no financial or campaign support and facing veteran Liberal incumbent Jillian Skinner and a Labor candidate in the overlapping state seat of North Shore, Ruff won more than 10 percent of the vote.

Regarding the North Sydney by-election, Mack stated "I've never seen an election where a Liberal candidate is so disliked by such a lot of Liberal members and Liberal voters". Leaked emails show potential voters were sent registration forms at 7:30 pm on a Thursday and asked to signal their availability, with the cut-off for replying by noon the next day. Advance notice of the e-mail and cut-off was provided to Zimmerman's backers. It was claimed up to 550 Liberal branch members were unable to vote after the Liberal state executive pushed through a shortened pre-selection process to select Zimmerman. Zimmerman is head of the body that sets the rules for Liberal pre-selections, which has been claimed as a "complete conflict of interest". Former North Sydney Liberal party member John Ruddick, described by journalist Peter Hartcher as a "prominent party reform activist", advocated that voters disenfranchised by the pre-selection process to preference Zimmerman last.

Mack also claimed that much of the electorate was angered that Hockey, who had written the "age of entitlement" speech, had forced a $1-million by-election within a year of the 2016 federal election, with the expectation of becoming the next Ambassador of Australia to the United States. The expectation was confirmed a few days after the by-election on 8 December.

The Liberal party room suffered from the attempted defection of Ian Macfarlane from the Liberal party room to the National party room with accompanying demands for additional Nationals cabinet representation, and the Mal Brough / James Ashby diary controversy deepened in the last week of the campaign.

== How-to-vote cards ==
Candidate volunteers distribute how-to-vote cards to voters at polling booths which show the candidate's suggested preference allocation. Candidates and parties which suggested preferences are shown in each column of the table below. Several candidates ran open tickets at this by-election.

	Arts	SPP	LDP	VEP	Future	Greens	Beregi	CDP	PUP	Liberal	Ruff	Cyclists	Bullet Train
Arts	1				6	3	6			10			
SPP		1			4	9	3			9			
LDP			1		10	11	11			8			
VEP				1	5	2	9			7			
Future					1	7	8			6			
Greens					7	1	4			5			
Beregi					8	4	1			4			
CDP					13	13	5	1		3			
Palmer United					12	10	12			2			
Liberal					11	12	13			1			
Ruff					9	8	7			11	1		
Cyclists					3	5	2			12			
Bullet Train					2	6	10			13			

== Polling ==
Two days before the by-election, a ReachTEL automated phone poll of 678 respondents, commissioned by the Save Our Councils Coalition, showed the Liberals with a 54.7 percent primary vote after exclusion of the 15.3 percent undecided. Accurately interpreted, this amounted to a 6.4 percent drop from the 2013 Liberal vote, rather than the 14.7 percent in the report, which ignored the undecided component. The poll result had the Greens on 22.8 percent, the Christian Democratic Party on 4.1 percent, and everyone else on 18.3 percent.

== Results ==
2015 North Sydney by-election
Party	Candidate	Votes	%	±%
Liberal	Trent Zimmerman	36,690	48.20	−12.84
Independent	Stephen Ruff	14,303	18.79	+18.79
Greens	Arthur Chesterfield-Evans	11,959	15.71	+0.36
Independent	Maryann Beregi	2,613	3.43	+3.43
Sustainable Population	William Bourke	2,189	2.88	+2.88
Christian Democrats	Silvana Nero	1,917	2.52	+1.51
Liberal Democrats	Sam Kennard	1,591	2.09	+2.09
Arts	Lou Pollard	1,400	1.84	+1.84
Bullet Train	Tim Bohm	964	1.27	+1.27
Voluntary Euthanasia	Kerry Bromson	815	1.07	+1.07
Cyclists	Luke Freeman	815	1.07	+1.07
Future	James Jansson	513	0.67	+0.67
Palmer United	Robert Marks	352	0.46	−1.23
Total formal votes		76,121	93.08	−1.54
Informal votes		5,658	6.92	+1.54
Turnout		81,779	78.37	−13.88
Two-candidate-preferred result
Liberal	Trent Zimmerman	45,848	60.23	−5.66
Independent	Stephen Ruff	30,273	39.77	+39.77
Liberal hold		Swing	N/A	

Results were final as of 22 December.

Liberal candidate Trent Zimmerman won with 48.2 percent of the primary vote after a larger-than-predicted 12.8 percent swing against the Turnbull Coalition government. This was only the second time in North Sydney's history that the successful Liberal candidate did not obtain a majority of the primary vote and had to rely on preferences. Zimmerman faced a double-digit primary vote swing − more than triple that of the 2015 Canning by-election − despite the absence of a Labor candidate. Labor have never been successful in the safe Liberal seat.

The Liberal two-candidate vote of 60.2 percent against independent Stephen Ruff compares to the previous election vote of 65.9 percent against Labor. The reduction of 5.7 percent cannot be considered a "two-party/candidate preferred swing"—when a major party is absent, preference flows to both major parties does not take place, resulting in asymmetric preference flows.

== See also ==
- Electoral results for the Division of North Sydney
- List of Australian federal by-elections
