= Hilary Penfold =

Australian parliamentary counsel and judge

Hilary Ruth Penfold PSM (born 1953) is an Australian former parliamentary counsel and judge. She was the first woman to be First Parliamentary Counsel and the first woman to be a resident judge in the Supreme Court of the Australian Capital Territory.

== Early life ==
Penfold was born in 1953 in Dunedin, New Zealand. At the age of three, her family moved to Australia. She was educated at Ascham School in Sydney. She studied the combined Arts / Law degrees course at the Australian National University in Canberra. She was a joint winner of the Tillyard Prize in 1976 with the theologian, philosopher and poet Kevin Hart.

== Career ==
Penfold joined the Office of Parliamentary Counsel (Australia) in 1977. In 1993, she became the first woman to be appointed First Parliamentary Counsel. Her drafting included legislation for the Tampa affair (the Border Protection Bill, rejected by the Senate), workplace relations reforms (the Workplace Relations Act 1996), and the constitutional amendments which would have been required to have created an Australian republic in 1999. She was awarded the Public Service Medal in 2000. In 2001, she was the first woman to be appointed a Commonwealth Queen's Counsel.

In 2004, Penfold became Secretary of the newly created Department of Parliamentary Services.

In 2008, she became the first woman to be a resident judge of the Supreme Court of the Australian Capital Territory. Margaret Beazley had been an additional judge from 1994 to 1997, but Penfold was the first woman to be a resident judge. She retired in 2018.

== Personal life ==
Penfold is married to Mark Cunliffe, and has three children.

Legal offices
Preceded by Terry Connolly	Judge of the Supreme Court of the Australian Capital Territory; 2008–2018	Succeeded by Chrissa Loukas-Karlsson
