= Robyn Read =

Australian politician

Member of the Australian Parliament for North Shore
- In office 5 November 1988 – 3 May 1991
- Preceded by: Ted Mack
- Succeeded by: Phillip Smiles

Deputy Mayor of North Sydney
- In office 25 September 1974 – 22 September 1976
- Mayor: David Wyllie
- Preceded by: David Wyllie
- Succeeded by: Carole Baker

Alderman of the Municipality of North Sydney for Kirribilli Ward
- In office 18 September 1971 – 17 September 1977

Alderman of the Municipality of North Sydney for East Ward
- In office 26 September 1987 – 14 September 1991

Personal details
- Born: St Leonards, New South Wales, Australia
- Party: Independent
- Education: University of Sydney

Robyn Read is an Australian former politician. She was the independent member for North Shore in the New South Wales Legislative Assembly from 1988 to 1991.

Read was born in St Leonards, the daughter of Norman Read and Edith Gordon. She was educated in Sydney and received a Bachelor of Arts and a Master of Town and Country Planning from the University of Sydney, becoming a journalist and university tutor. Moving into public service, she was head of the Central Policy Unit in the New South Wales Department of Planning, commissioner of Water Resources in New South Wales, and director of the New South Wales Land Co-ordination Unit. Federally she was executive director of city services in Canberra. She sat on North Sydney Municipal Council 1970–77 and 1987–91, and was general manager of Byron Shire Council.

In 1988, the Independent MP for the state seat of North Shore, Ted Mack, resigned from Parliament to avoid qualifying for a parliamentary pension. Read contested the resulting by-election as an independent with Mack's endorsement, and easily defeated her nearest rival, Liberal candidate Jillian Skinner. In the 1991 redistribution, however, the neighbouring seat of Mosman was abolished, and Read was challenged by its Liberal MP, Phillip Smiles and Smiles won narrowly. Read contested North Shore one more time unsuccessfully in the by-election held in 1994 in which she was defeated in a rematch by her old Liberal rival Jillian Skinner.

A crime novel written by Read, The More Things Change, was published in 1996 by Random House. In the novel the body of a member of parliament is found floating in the pool in parliament house. Set in Sydney, the journalist Kate Corbett investigates the murder, uncovering endemic corruption and vice along the way. The original manuscript is in the National Library of Australia Trove collection.

Civic offices
Preceded by David Wyllie	Deputy Mayor of North Sydney; 1974–1976	Succeeded by Carole Baker
New South Wales Legislative Assembly
Preceded by Ted Mack	Member for North Shore; 1988–1991	Succeeded by Phillip Smiles
Government offices
Preceded by	General Manager of Byron Shire Council; 2001–2002	Succeeded by
