= Phillip Smiles =

Australian politician

Phillip Murray Smiles (25 May 1946 – 5 March 2025) was a former Australian politician. He was a Liberal member of the New South Wales Legislative Assembly, representing Mosman from 1984 to 1991 and North Shore from 1991 to 1993.

== Early life ==
Smiles was born in Mosman, and attended local public schools. He then studied at the University of Sydney, where he received a Bachelor of Law and a Bachelor of Economics; at the University of New South Wales, where he received a Master of Business Administration, and Sydney Teachers College, where he received a Diploma of Education. He was employed as a marketing and management consultant before entering parliament.

== Political career ==
In 1984, the state member for the safe Liberal seat of Mosman, David Arblaster, retired. Smiles contested the preselection but was opposed by the local mayor, Dom Lopez and Malcolm Turnbull. Smiles was successful, and went on to defeat Lopez (running as an independent) in the election. In 1991, his seat was abolished, and he contested North Shore and defeated the Independent member, Robyn Read. He became the first Liberal to represent North Shore; it had been held by independents since its creation even though it had originally been created as an ultra-safe Liberal seat. He was briefly Assistant Treasurer from 1991 to 1992.

However, his career imploded after he tried to claim his nannies as a tax deduction. He claimed that his nannies did secretarial work for him, but they testified under oath that they had done nothing of the sort. In 1993, he was convicted of tax evasion and fined $30,000 in what was dubbed the "Nannygate" case in the Australian press. As a result, he was forced to resign from parliament. He was investigated by the New South Wales parliament.

Smiles was acquitted on appeal, but the court did not find him innocent and thus refused to order the Tax Office to foot his legal bills. Smiles then sued his accountant, Ted Moon, claiming that Moon's advice had led him to try to claim his nannies as a deduction. In 2003, the Supreme Court not only found in Moon's favour, but ordered Smiles to pay Moon's legal costs of close to $700,000. On 6 June 2005, registrar Sue McIllhatton declared him bankrupt, in part because he hadn't paid Moon a single cent of what he was owed.

New South Wales Legislative Assembly
Preceded by David Arblaster	Member for Mosman; 1984–1991	Succeeded by Abolished
Preceded by Robyn Read	Member for North Shore; 1991–1993	Succeeded by Jillian Skinner
