= Chrissa Loukas-Karlsson =

Australian judge

The Honourable Justice Chrissa Loukas-Karlsson SC
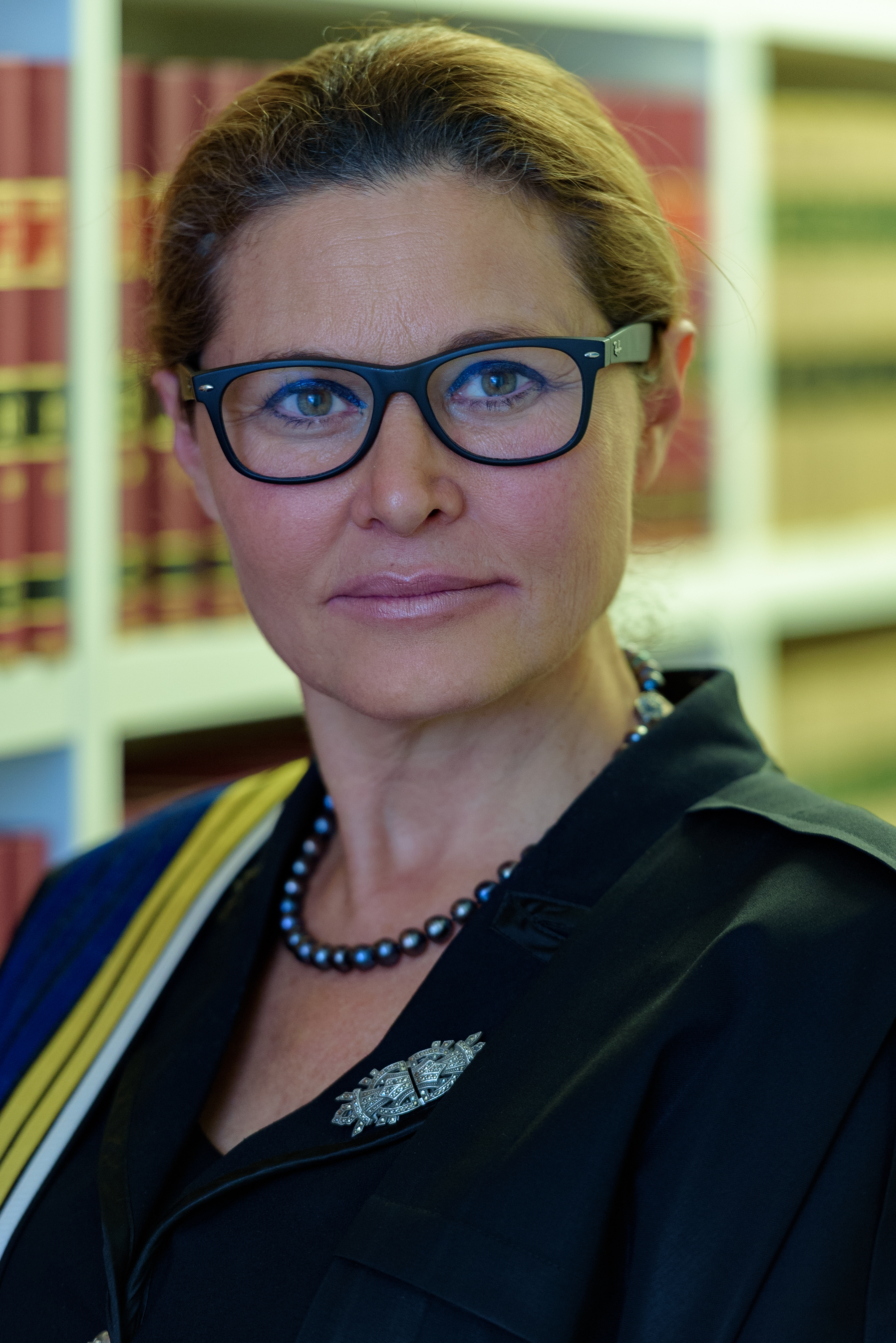

Resident Justice of the ACT Supreme Court
- Incumbent
- Assumed office 26 March 2018
- Nominated by: Gordon Ramsay
- Appointed by: Gordon Ramsay
- Preceded by: Hilary Penfold

Personal details
- Education: University of Sydney

Chrissa Loukas-Karlsson is an Australian jurist. She was sworn in as a Resident Justice of the Supreme Court of the Australian Capital Territory on 26 March 2018.

== Education and legal career ==
Loukas-Karlsson attended school in Rockhampton, Queensland and Sydney completing high school at the Liverpool Girls school in Sydney. She was the Dux of her graduating year. After high school, Loukas-Karlsson studied at the University of Sydney, graduating in 1985 with a Bachelor of Laws degree and a Bachelor of Arts degree.

After graduating from the University of Sydney, Loukas-Karlsson pursued a career in law, being admitted as a solicitor in New South Wales in July 1985 after which she worked at the Aboriginal Legal Service and the Legal Aid Commission.

In 1989, Loukas-Karlsson was called to the New South Wales Bar where she primarily worked on criminal cases as defence counsel. In 1995, Loukas-Karlsson was appointed as a Barrister with the New South Wales Public Defenders and in 1996 was appointed as an Acting Crown Prosecutor. Throughout her time at the Bar, Loukas-Karlsson maintained her connection to the University of Sydney, returning to the University and Schools Club in 1990 to debate future Australian Prime Minister Malcolm Turnbull AC.

== Later career ==
In 1996, Loukas-Karlsson was appointed as an Acting Judge of the District Court of New South Wales where she presided over criminal trials. Loukas-Karlsson was also appointed by the New South Wales Government as a part-time Judicial Member of the Administrative Decisions Tribunal (now known as NSW NCAT), a position she held until 2003.

Loukas-Karlsson appeared as counsel before the UN International Criminal Tribunal for the former Yugoslavia in the Hague from 2003 to 2006 after which she returned to the New South Wales Bar. In 2012, Loukas-Karlsson was appointed Senior Counsel.

== Appointment as a Justice of the ACT Supreme Court ==
In February 2018, Loukas-Karlsson was announced as a resident Justice of the Supreme Court of the Australian Capital Territory and was sworn in on 26 March, with the ACT Attorney General Gordon Ramsay noting that Loukas-Karlsson's "curriculum vitae is indeed impressive. You have 30 years of experience in criminal law, including six as senior counsel, and you have appeared in courts across state, federal and international jurisdictions. I am most confident that the diverse skills and the perspectives that you will bring to the bench will be very valuable to the court and to the broader community".

Mr Archer, the President of the ACT Bar Association commented that "If I could talk to your [Loukas-Karlsson's] CV perhaps in a thematic way: a commitment to championing the role of women, not only in the law but generally; a commitment to social justice; an undying faith in the idea of equality before the law; and a preparedness to take on the hardest cases and argue the cause of the most vulnerable; decades of achievement with the Legal Aid Office, the Aboriginal Legal Service and The Public Defenders Office; starting as an advocate in the courts when there were few female advocates".

== Honours and service roles ==
In 2002, Loukas-Karlsson was awarded the Woman Lawyer of Achievement Award and in 2013 was further recognised with the Senior Barrister Award at the Australian Women in Law Awards. In 2017, Loukas-Karlsson also received the Women Lawyers Association of New South Wales Barrister of the Year Award.

These awards included recognition of Loukas-Karlsson's contributions to the wider legal profession in New South Wales and Australia, with Loukas-Karlsson having served as a Bar Council Member in New South Wales for over two decades. Loukas-Karlsson was elected to the executive of the New South Wales Bar Council in 2015 and Junior Vice President in 2017.
