= Jack Grahame =

Australian lawyer

John Maitland "Jack" Grahame (30 November 1933 – 2013) was an Australian lawyer.

He was born in Gosford to William Calman Grahame, a former New South Wales agriculture minister, and Myra Campbell. He studied at Gosford High School and the University of Sydney, gaining a law degree and qualifying as a solicitor in 1965. In 1961 he married Rachel Cookson. Known as a campaigner for left-wing causes, he was especially prominent in the cause of prison reform. He was a member of the Australian Council for Civil Liberties and a founder of the Penal Reform Council and New South Wales Labor Lawyers. In 1978 he went into a partnership with several friends, developing a sales tax minimisation scheme. He and the others were arrested in 1985 for conspiracy to defraud the Commonwealth, but charges were dropped in 1990. From 1992 he worked for the Prisoners Legal Service of New South Wales Legal Aid. Grahame died in 2013.
