= Trent Zimmerman =

Australian politician (born 1968)

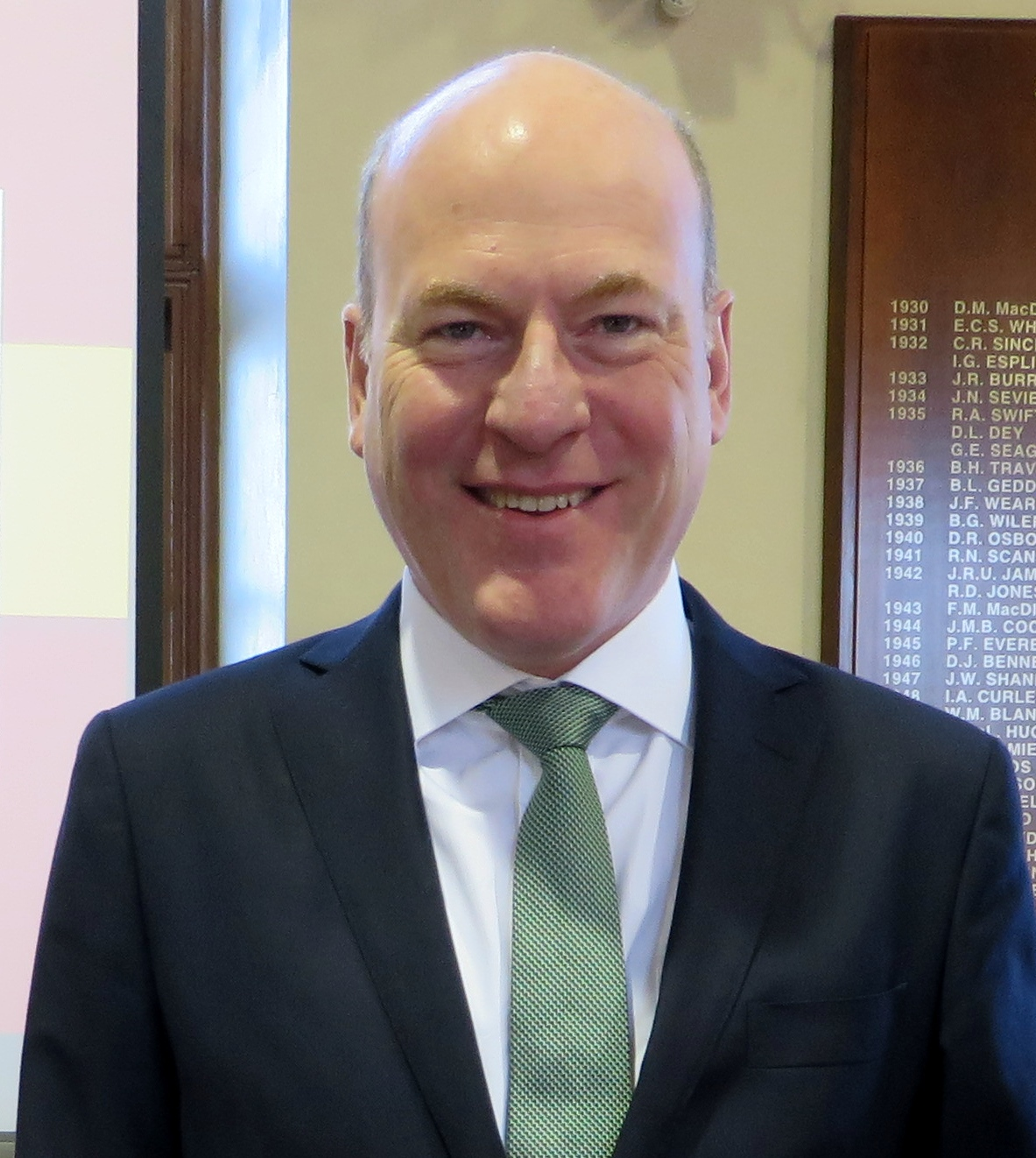

Member of the Australian Parliament for North Sydney
- In office 5 December 2015 – 21 May 2022
- Preceded by: Joe Hockey
- Succeeded by: Kylea Tink

Councillor of North Sydney Council for Wollstonecraft Ward
- In office 27 March 2004 – 8 September 2012

Personal details
- Born: Trent Moir Zimmerman; 15 October 1968 (age 58) Sydney, Australia
- Party: Liberal Party
- Parents: Roy Zimmerman OAM; Brenda Zimmerman
- Education: Newington College
- Alma mater: University of Sydney

Trent Moir Zimmerman (born 15 October 1968) is an Australian former politician. He was the member of Parliament (MP) for the division of North Sydney from 2015‍–‍2022, representing the Liberal Party of Australia. Zimmerman was the first openly LGBTI member of the House of Representatives.

He was a Vice-President and State President of the NSW Division of the Liberal Party of Australia and was also previously Deputy Chief Executive and director, Transport Policy, of the Tourism and Transport Forum of Australia.

Zimmerman lost the seat of North Sydney at the 2022 Australian federal election to independent Kylea Tink, following a trend in that election of the nation's wealthiest electorates choosing Climate 200 backed teal independents and removing the Liberal Party from its safest seats.

== Early life ==
Zimmerman was born in Sydney and is one of two children of Roy and Brenda Zimmerman. His father, Roy Zimmerman OAM, was Master-in-Charge of the GPS preparatory school Wyvern House from 1966‍–‍1996. Zimmerman attended Newington College, commencing in Wyvern House in 1974 and completing his HSC in 1986.

== Career ==
After working in the Parliament of New South Wales, Zimmerman became a ministerial adviser in the federal government of John Howard in the environment and heritage portfolio and later as an adviser to then Shadow Treasurer Joe Hockey.

He was President of the Young Liberal Movement of NSW from 1992‍–‍1993 and Federal President from 1993‍–‍1994.

Zimmerman was a councillor on North Sydney Council for two terms until the local government elections of 2012. During his time as a councillor, Zimmerman lived openly as a gay man and worked actively on LGBTI issues, describing the de-funding of the NorthAIDS program as "unforgivable". He also served as Vice President of the Sydney Gay and Lesbian Business Association.

In the September 2008 Council Elections, Zimmerman ran for the position of Mayor of North Sydney, against the long-serving incumbent, Genia McCaffery who had been in office since 1995. He was unsuccessful, getting 40% of the vote, and later commented that "I worked very hard at it and I have no qualms at the issues I raised".

During his time at Council, Zimmerman advocated on environmental issues around developments, including leading opposition to a controversial development in Vale Street, Cammeray.

Zimmerman served on the State Executive of the NSW Division of the Liberal Party from 2006‍–‍2017. He was Vice President of the Division between 2011‍–‍2015 and State President from 2015‍–‍2017.

In 2016, Zimmerman founded the North Sydney Innovation Network, to promote and enhance the fast growing contribution of innovation related businesses on the lower north shore of Sydney, bringing together people in business from different industries and sectors.

== Federal parliament ==
Zimmerman was preselected for the Liberal Party for the 2015 North Sydney by-election, which was triggered by the retirement of Joe Hockey. Zimmerman had a considerable 12.8% swing against him on primary votes, but suffered only a 5.6% swing in the two candidate preferred vote. Zimmerman won the two-candidate vote of 60.2 percent against independent Stephen Ruff. In the two subsequent elections, Zimmerman has had relatively similar two party results to the by-election with 63.6% in 2016 and 59.3% in 2019.

Zimmerman was sworn into parliament on 2 February 2016.

Zimmerman was Chair of the House Standing Committee on Health, Aged Care and Sport from 2016‍–‍2022. As Chair, he oversaw parliamentary inquiries into allergies, hearing health, sleep health, vaping, childhood rheumatic disease, and the New Frontiers report examining access to novel medical treatments and technologies.

=== Political views ===
Zimmerman is a member of the moderate faction of the Liberal Party.

Zimmerman has advocated strongly for LGBTI issues and was the first openly LGBTI member of the House of Representatives. Zimmerman indicated he would speak out on LGBTI issues and declared his support for gay marriage in Australia and stated "I would have supported a free vote and preferred it to be decided by the Parliament. But that's the path we are going to go down so I will be strongly advocating, both in North Sydney and more broadly, a Yes vote for that plebiscite".

On 10 February 2022, Zimmerman crossed the floor with four other Liberal MPs to include protection for transgender students in the government's modifications to the Sex Discrimination Act 1984, these amendments to the Act were later abandoned by the government.

== Controversies ==
=== Preselection ===
Zimmerman's preselection raised questions, with now-suspended party member Juris Laucis describing the process as "undemocratic" and "a stitch-up" and reform activist and former Liberal party member John Ruddick called for Liberal voters feeling disenfranchised to send a message to the party by giving Zimmerman their last preference. Political journalist Peter Hartcher attributed his preselection to his being an ally of Michael Photios, "the power behind the NSW machine". He was also accused of racial discrimination when he accused others of "racial branch stacking".

Other questions about his preselection were raised since Zimmerman was also the head of the body that sets the rules for party elections, a position his opponents described as a "complete conflict of interest." Ted Mack, former independent member for North Sydney and Hockey's predecessor in the seat, ran a campaign against Zimmerman on behalf of Stephen Ruff, the independent who ran second in the by-election.

=== North Sydney swimming pool ===
In early 2020, it emerged that a program of the Morrison government that was supposed to give money for local sports infrastructure was being used to further their own political goals, with many projects deemed worthy not receiving any money, in what came to be known as the "sports rorts" affair.

One project that received a lot of attention was the North Sydney swimming pool that received $10 million even though that money was earmarked for rural and regional communities. Zimmerman advocated for the money for his electorate and then defended the government's use of the money.

=== Support for vaping ===
In 2018, Zimmerman as Chairman of the Standing Committee on Health, Aged Care and Sport disagreed with the majority view to maintain bans on e-cigarettes. He subsequently lobbied Greg Hunt, the Government's own Health Minister to delay new restrictions on importing liquid nicotine which is used for vaping. It subsequently emerged that Zimmerman's coalition partner had received $120,000 from tobacco giant Philip Morris International, which has partial ownership of an e-cigarette company.

=== Political funding ===
Just before the 2022 election it was reported that Zimmerman was the beneficiary of $300,000 raised at a Liberal fund raising event organised by Joseph Carrozzi, a former PwC managing partner, prominent tax expert and chairman of the Sydney Harbour Federation Trust. Carrozzi was appointed to the Trust's Board in April 2016 by Greg Hunt who was the federal Environment Minister at the time. In July 2018, Carrozzi was appointed as Chair of the Harbour Trust by Josh Frydenberg.

== See also ==
- List of LGBTI holders of political offices in Australia

Parliament of Australia
Preceded by Joe Hockey	Member for North Sydney; 2015–2022	Succeeded by Kylea Tink
