= Joe Hockey =

Australian politician (born 1965)

The Honourable Joe Hockey
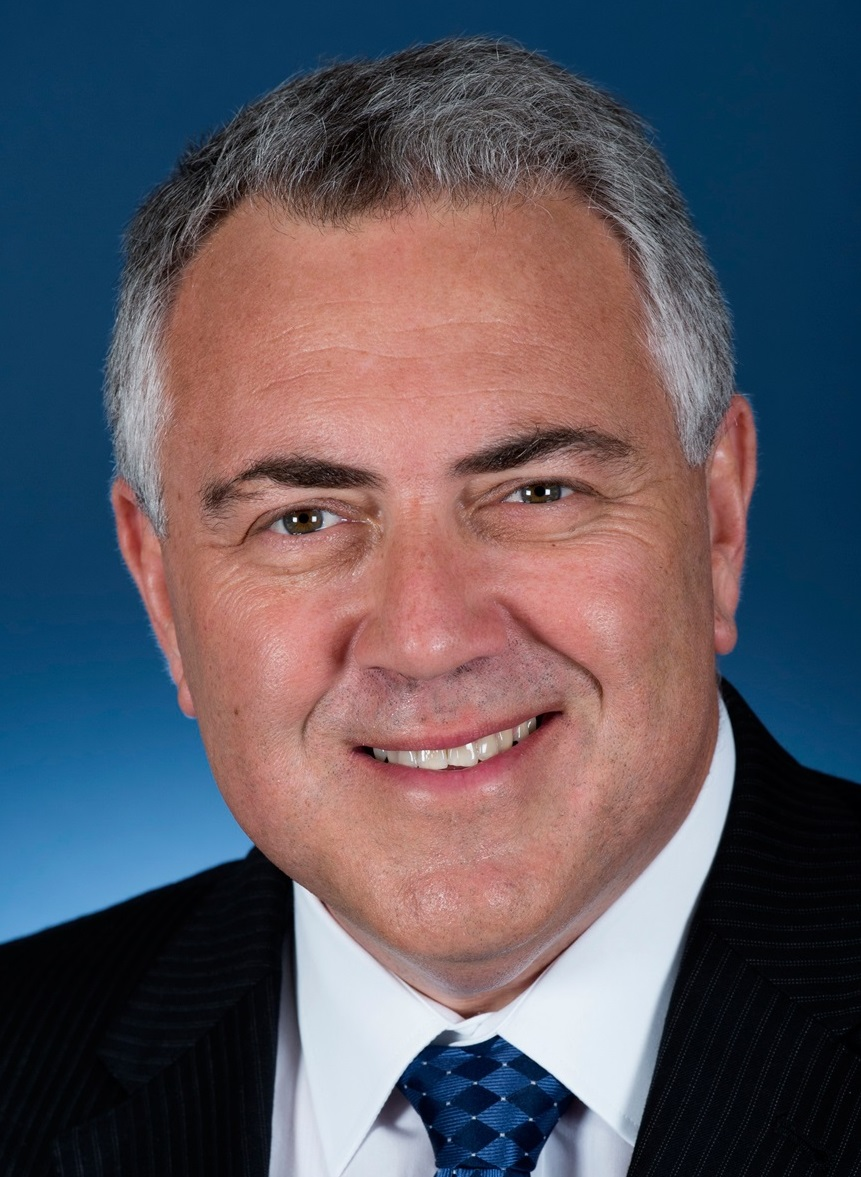
- Official portrait, 2016

21st Ambassador of Australia to the United States
- In office 29 January 2016 – 30 January 2020
- Prime Minister: Malcolm Turnbull; Scott Morrison
- Preceded by: Kim Beazley
- Succeeded by: Arthur Sinodinos

Treasurer of Australia
- In office 18 September 2013 – 21 September 2015
- Prime Minister: Tony Abbott; Malcolm Turnbull
- Preceded by: Chris Bowen
- Succeeded by: Scott Morrison

Manager of Opposition Business
- In office 3 December 2007 – 16 February 2009
- Leader: Brendan Nelson; Malcolm Turnbull
- Preceded by: Anthony Albanese
- Succeeded by: Christopher Pyne

Minister for Employment and Workplace Relations
- In office 30 January 2007 – 3 December 2007
- Prime Minister: John Howard
- Preceded by: Kevin Andrews
- Succeeded by: Julia Gillard

Minister for Human Services
- In office 26 October 2004 – 30 January 2007
- Prime Minister: John Howard
- Preceded by: Jocelyn Newman
- Succeeded by: Ian Campbell

Minister for Small Business and Tourism
- In office 26 November 2001 – 26 October 2004
- Prime Minister: John Howard
- Preceded by: Ian Macfarlane
- Succeeded by: Fran Bailey

Member of the Australian Parliament for North Sydney
- In office 2 March 1996 – 23 October 2015
- Preceded by: Ted Mack
- Succeeded by: Trent Zimmerman

Personal details
- Born: Joseph Benedict Hockey; 2 August 1965 (age 61) North Sydney, New South Wales, Australia
- Party: Liberal
- Other political affiliations: Coalition
- Spouse: Melissa Babbage (m. 1994)
- Children: 3
- Education: University of Sydney

Joseph Benedict Hockey (born 2 August 1965) is an Australian former politician and diplomat who served as the treasurer in the Abbott government from 2013 to 2015. A member of the Liberal Party, he was the member of Parliament (MP) for the New South Wales division of North Sydney from 1996 to 2015. Hockey served as the ambassador of Australia to the United States from 2016 to 2020.

Hockey's parliamentary resignation triggered a 2015 North Sydney by-election where he was succeeded by Trent Zimmerman, who had previously worked for Hockey as a staffer. His appointment as Ambassador of Australia to the United States was announced on 8 December 2015 to replace Kim Beazley, whose term ended in early 2016, and he assumed that position on 29 January 2016. His term as ambassador ended on 30 January 2020, and he was succeeded by Arthur Sinodinos the week after.

== Early life and career ==
Hockey was born the youngest of four siblings in North Sydney to an Australian mother, Beverley, and a Palestinian-Armenian father, Richard Hokeidonian, who was born in Palestine. His father's surname was anglicised to "Hockey" in 1948 after his arrival in Australia. He was named after Joseph Benedict Chifley, the post-war prime minister whose immigration policies allowed for his father to enter Australia.

Hockey attended St Aloysius' College, Milsons Point and the University of Sydney, residing at St John's College, graduating with a Bachelor of Arts and a Bachelor of Laws. While at university he was President of the University of Sydney Students' Representative Council, and assisted in inviting Pope John Paul II to visit the University of Sydney during the 1986 Australian papal visit. In 1987, Hockey protested at Bob Hawke's introduction of university fees. Hockey's term as SRC president, besides the protests, included the renovation of the club's headquarters, a cutback on the expenses of Honi Soit, the closure of the SRC Women's Room, but the opening of a free legal advice service. Towards the end of his term as SRC President, the Australian Labor Party's Deputy Prime Minister Lionel Bowen phoned Hockey and invited him to join the ALP. Hockey researched the philosophies of John Stuart Mill and decided to join the Liberal Party. Upon graduating, Hockey worked as a banking and finance lawyer at Corrs Chambers Westgarth and subsequently as the Director of Policy to the Premier of New South Wales, before entering politics.

== Political career ==
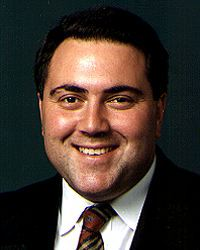
Hockey's 1996 parliamentary portrait

Hockey worked as a policy advisor to Premier John Fahey before the 1995 New South Wales state election. Hockey became the president of the NSW Young Liberals and had a position in Nick Greiner's state government, reforming the financial and business structure of the state.

=== Howard government ===
Hockey was preselected as a Liberal Party of Australia candidate for the 1996 election in the Division of North Sydney when aged just 29. He faced little preselection competition, since the seat's incumbent independent, Ted Mack, was thought to be unbeatable. However, Mack did not renominate; had his intentions been known earlier, it was widely believed at the time that Hockey would have faced a more rigorous preselection contest for what has traditionally been a "blue ribbon" Liberal seat. As it was, Hockey all but assured himself of becoming the seat's next member with his preselection victory. "Traditional" two-party matchups during Mack's tenure had shown North Sydney as a fairly safe Liberal seat, and it had been a foregone conclusion that the seat would revert to the Liberals once Mack retired. In 1993, for instance, the Liberals would have held the seat on a traditional two-party margin of 9.5 percent–just on the edge of being safe. As expected, Hockey regained the seat for the Liberals on 65.6 percent of the two-party preferred vote. He actually won 57.8 percent of the primary vote, more than enough to win the seat outright without the need for preferences.

When contesting the 1996 election, Hockey purchased a bus and painted it in the colors of the North Sydney Bears. This move positioned him as an independent and emphasized his local connections. Hockey would park the bus everywhere in his electorate to raise awareness. Robert Orrell, Hockey's campaign manager in 1995, states that Hockey presented himself as a Liberal in "John Howard" areas like Lane Cove which had recently been redistributed from Howard's seat of Bennelong. He branded himself as an independent in areas like North Sydney and McMahons Point. Hockey made use of his parents’ reputation within the local community and his business connections to successfully connect with supporters and volunteers - giving out umbrellas and other souvenirs. A key issue in the 1996 election was the issue of aircraft noise: Laurie Brereton, the ALP transport minister, had closed east–west runways and opened north–south runways at Sydney Airport, diverting aircraft noise from Labor seats to Liberal seats.

Soon after his election in 1996, He was appointed the chair of the Sydney Airport Community Forum. During this time, Hockey formed a friendship with Anthony Albanese, and Albanese took Hockey to his electorate to see the inequalities of the airport routing. Following this, Hockey worked to address inconsistencies in the airport noise amelioration program. Hockey and fellow "small-l liberals" Chris Gallus and Susan Jeanes founded the short-lived John Stuart Mill Society to combat the conservative Lyons Forum. Hockey made his maiden speech in September 1996, highlighting modern liberalism, composed of recognition of the rights of the individual, parliamentary democracy, and committing to improve society through reform. Hockey highlighted his father's heritage, and highlighted barriers against women achieving success. In the lead-up to the 1998 election, which Hockey characterised as "the GST election", despite being the minister in charge of the GST, Hockey stopped campaigning shortly before the election because he felt that talking about the GST was losing him votes. He was appointed as the first Minister for Financial Services and Regulation portfolio from 1998 to 2001 and Minister for Small Business and Tourism (2001–04).

In January 2000, Hockey had done an interview with the John Laws program about the GST, confirming the Australian Competition & Consumer Commission (ACCC)'s position of businesses being able to round up or down the price of goods and services when needed. This caused controversy, and The Daily Telegraph printed a story that declared that voters could be charged more than the 10% GST promised.

When HIH Insurance went bankrupt in March 2001, Joe Hockey was the minister responsible for the Australian Prudential Regulation Authority (APRA), which oversaw HIH. Although Hockey's office had sought written assurances from HIH that everything was fine, the public felt that Hockey was to blame. Upon learning that the estimated damages were between $4-$8 billion, Hockey took this to the Cabinet and sought a bail out. Peter Costello advised that APRA should sort out HIH. After the collapse of HIH Insurance, Hockey became concerned about the NRMA, and called Australian Securities & Investments Commission (ASIC), the ACCC, APRA and the Australian Taxation Office and instructed them to investigate NRMA Insurance thoroughly.

As part of his work as Tourism Minister, Hockey produced a White Paper analysing the tourism industry.

With the return of the Howard government in 2004, he was appointed as the first Minister for Human Services setting up a new health and welfare service delivery department, and took on the additional role of Minister Assisting the Minister for Workplace Relations in August 2006. He was elevated to the Cabinet in January 2007, when appointed Minister for Employment and Workplace Relations and Minister Assisting the Prime Minister for the Public Service. Although North Sydney has long been a blue-ribbon Liberal seat, Hockey was the first person in over 60 years to be promoted to cabinet while holding the seat.

In 2004 as Human Services Minister, Hockey proposed an "Access Card" and spent $3 million advertising the card before submitting the legislation to parliament.

Hockey regularly appeared on the Seven Network's morning program Sunrise in the "Big Guns of Politics" section debating the Opposition Leader, Kevin Rudd, drawing 20,000–30,000 additional viewers who would tune in specifically for that segment, until the arrangement was mutually terminated on 16 April 2007 following controversy over plans to stage a pre-dawn Anzac Day service in Vietnam. Hockey credits this show for introducing him to an audience who had no interest in politics.

=== Opposition ===
In December 2007, Hockey was made Shadow Minister for Health and Ageing and took on the additional role in February 2008 as Manager of Opposition Business. In September 2008 he became Shadow Minister for Finance, Competition Policy and Deregulation. He became Shadow Treasurer in February 2009 when Julie Bishop stepped down from the portfolio.

Prior to his appointment as shadow treasurer there had been a move to get Hockey to transfer to New South Wales state politics to replace Barry O'Farrell as state Liberal leader and lead the Coalition to victory at the 2011 state election, which would have made Hockey the Premier of New South Wales. Hockey, however, denied any interest to move into state politics. The push to get Hockey into state politics came to an end when he was promoted to shadow treasurer as that placed him within striking distance of becoming federal leader.

Hockey's popularity among voters grew under the leadership of Malcolm Turnbull and, in October 2009, polls showed him as the preferred Liberal leader. However, Hockey announced that he had no intention to challenge for the leadership.

On 9 November 2009, Hockey gave a speech, "In Defence of God", at the Sydney Institute.

Australia has embraced religious diversity. It must always remain so, and as a member of parliament I am a custodian of that principle of tolerance. That is why it is disturbing to hear people rail against Muslims and Jews, or Pentecostals and Catholics. Australia must continue, without fear, to embrace diversity of faith provided that those gods are loving, compassionate and just."

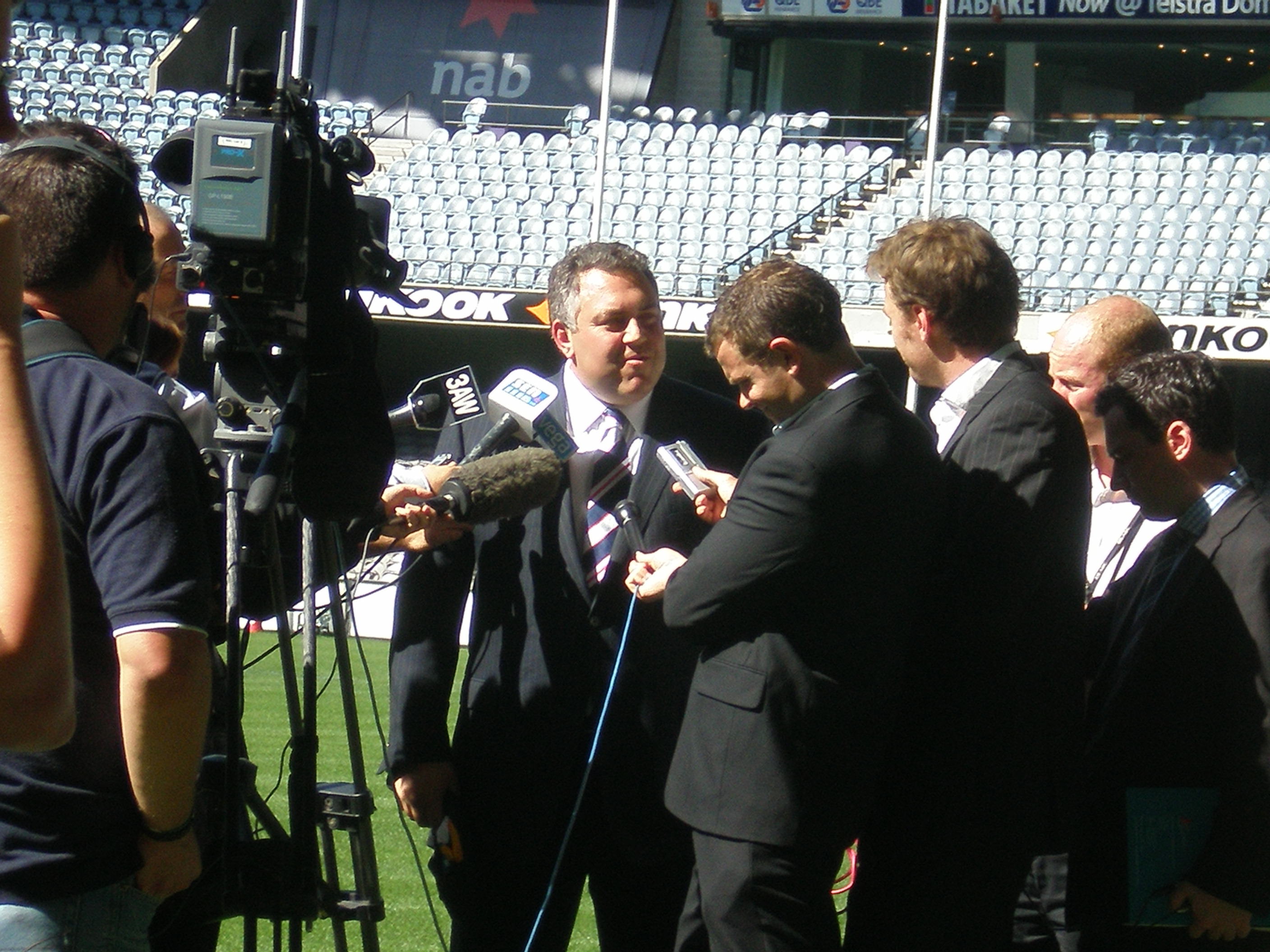
Hockey at a press conference on the ground at Docklands Stadium, Melbourne

A Newspoll released on 30 November 2009 placed Hockey at 33%, Turnbull at 30% and Tony Abbott at 19%, when voters were asked who would be the "best person to lead" the Liberal Party. Speculation flourished that Hockey would challenge Turnbull for the leadership of the Liberal Party, and Hockey consulted senior party dignitaries such as Howard and Costello about whether he should run.

Hockey faced a dilemma. He had been a consistent supporter of the ETS. Running against Turnbull, a fellow moderate in the Liberal Party, would mean taking the leadership with the support of the party's right wing and climate change sceptics.

On 1 December 2009, Hockey chose to include his candidacy in a party room ballot to determine the leadership of the Liberal Party. The ballot was between Hockey, Turnbull and Abbott. Hockey was eliminated in the first round of the ballot, with the eventual winner being Abbott. Following the change of leadership, Hockey remained Shadow Treasurer.

He told ABC TV's Q&A audience on 7 March 2011 that corporate Australia had fallen behind in female boardroom representation and if companies failed to meet a reasonable target within a period of time then "more punitive measures" needed to be taken by parliament. He later said that "quotas must be a last resort".

Hockey gave a speech to the Grattan Institute on 11 March 2010 called "In Defence of Liberty". The speech defended anti-terrorism laws and rejected a hypothetical bill of rights, while criticising increased police powers. A series of "In Defence..." speeches by Hockey followed over 2010 and 2011: "In Defence of Enterprise" to the EIDOS Institute on 14 April 2010; "In Defence of Opportunity" to the Sydney Institute on 9 March 2011; and "In Defence of Youth" to the University of New England on 27 July 2011. This series of speeches were seen as Hockey's bid for the Liberal leadership.

Biographer Madonna King points out "Australia's Future Engagement in the Asian Century" (25 October 2011) and "The Future of Free Markets, Global Trade and Commerce" (7 December 2011) as other key speeches from this three-year period of Joe Hockey trying to show what he stood for.

On 17 April 2012, Hockey gave a speech at the Institute of Economic Affairs in London. He warned Australians that the time to become self-sufficient was at hand and that the government could not afford to give "universal payments" to Australians. The speech was controversial in Australia, sparking discussion on the ABC Lateline program and an article in The Australian. The speech was said to change the public's perception of Hockey from "avuncular" to "hard-head". and foreshadowing Hockey's first budget.

On 26 April 2012, Hockey gave a speech, "The Future of Australian Diversity", at the Islamic Council of Victoria. "To judge Islam based on the actions of extremists and terrorists would be no different than judging Christianity on the actions of those who have over the centuries committed atrocities in the name of Christianity."

=== Abbott government ===
The Coalition won government at the 2013 election, and Hockey was named Treasurer.

In 2014, the "end of the age of entitlement" was used to justify the government refusing financial assistance to Holden in South Australia and SPC Ardmona in Victoria and explaining why they could not participate in Barnaby Joyce's proposal for a bail out of farmers. Hockey's approach has been described by sociology lecturer Verity Archer as being like former US President Richard Nixon's, "using claims of a budget emergency" to cut welfare.

In April 2014, Hockey faced criticism for saying "the poorest people either don't have cars, or actually don't drive very far" when seeking an increase in the fuel excise tax.

In May 2014, Fairfax media published a story stating that political donors to the North Sydney Forum were able to have "VIP" meetings with Hockey, under the title "Treasurer for Sale".

Hockey delivered the 2014 budget on 13 May 2014. The austere budget faced widespread criticism and was overwhelmingly rejected by the Australian public as reflected in all opinion polls after its release. Michael Pascoe, writing for The Sydney Morning Herald, regards Hockey as being saddled with policies that were fiscally irresponsible, but designed to win support, giving as an example the scrapping of the price on carbon. Hockey was considered by his colleagues to have made a poor case for the economic reforms in the 2014 budget. The Guardian writes that criticism of the budget as "unfair" harmed Hockey's public image.

After the February 2015 Liberal party leadership spill motion, there were calls for Hockey to be replaced as Treasurer.

In the lead-up to the 2015 budget, Abbott stated that no matter how the budget was received, Hockey would continue as Treasurer. Hockey delivered the 2015 budget. This was considered a vast contrast to the 2014 budget.

In June 2015, Hockey was criticised over his response to housing affordability issues, where he advised first home buyers to "get a good job that pays good money".

In August 2015, Peter FitzSimons, chair of the Australian Republican Movement, announced that Joe Hockey would help lead a parliamentary friendship group aimed at a referendum on an Australian republic before 2020. This led to criticism of Hockey by members of the Coalition, who regarded the renewed push for a republic to be a distraction from the government's priorities. Later in August, a leak stated that two cabinet ministers were urging Abbott to reassign Hockey as treasurer.

After Malcolm Turnbull ousted Abbott at the 2015 Liberal leadership spill, there was growing speculation that Turnbull would not retain Hockey as Treasurer in his new government, even though as mentioned above they are both members of the Liberal Party's moderate wing. Although Turnbull offered Hockey a different role in his government, Hockey declined and on 20 September 2015 announced his intention to leave Parliament. Hockey gave his final speech to parliament on 21 October 2015.

=== Parliamentary resignation and US Ambassador role ===
Hockey resigned from parliament on 23 October 2015 which triggered the 2015 North Sydney by-election which was won by Trent Zimmerman. It was announced on 8 December 2015 that Hockey would become the next Ambassador of Australia to the United States when Kim Beazley's term ended in early 2016. In his new role as Ambassador, Hockey wrote a response to a New York Times editorial about cuts to climate change research at CSIRO. In the first 100 days of Donald Trump's presidency, Malcolm Turnbull and Trump had a phone conversation regarding the agreement for the US to take detained refugees from Manus Island that Turnbull had struck with Barack Obama. Trump described the deal as "dumb" on Twitter. Hockey met with Steve Bannon and Reince Priebus for discussions.

Hockey's term as ambassador was extended for a year but ended on 30 January 2020, and was replaced as ambassador by former Liberal Party Senator Arthur Sinodinos the week after. His farewell party was held on 17 January 2020 in Washington, D.C., and was attended by Abbott and Australian golfer Greg Norman.

== Post-political career ==
At the start of 2020, Hockey planned to continue staying and working in the United States for several years after his role as ambassador to the United States. He took up a part-time position as a guest lecturer on public policy and politics at American University for the Spring 2020 semester.

In the same year, Hockey founded Bondi Partners, an advisory and investment firm, in Washington, D.C. Named after the famous Sydney beach where Hockey's parents first met, Bondi Partners was created to provide support to businesses across Australia, the U.S., the U.K., and global markets.

Hockey made unsubstantiated claims of fraud in the Presidential vote of the 2020 United States elections. Hockey's basis for the claim was a 93% Democratic vote in Washington, D.C., where he had been living for several years. However, the Democratic vote in Washington, D.C., regularly reaches the level cited by Hockey. Hockey wrote an opinion piece in The Sydney Morning Herald supporting Joe Biden for President of the United States.

In October 2022 Hockey released his autobiography:

- Hockey, Joe (2022). Diplomatic A Washington memoir. Leo Shanahan. HarperCollins. ISBN 978-1-4607-1314-3. OCLC 1351982318.

== Personal life ==
Hockey met Melissa Babbage, his future wife, in 1991 at a Young Liberals state convention. On 18 December 1994, Hockey married Babbage, an investment banker, later head of foreign exchange and global finance at Deutsche Bank. As of 2014, the couple had three children and lived in Hunters Hill, New South Wales. Upon the birth of his youngest child, Hockey became the first federal Minister to take paternity leave. He has walked the Kokoda Track and has climbed Mount Kilimanjaro to raise funds for medical equipment. Hockey and his wife became owners of a 200 hectare cattle farm in Malanda, near Cairns, Queensland. In 2012, he lost more than 20 kilograms following gastric sleeve surgery.

In 2014, Hockey launched defamation proceedings against Fairfax Media over an article published in its newspapers, The Sydney Morning Herald, The Age and The Canberra Times, titled Treasurer for sale, which he said falsely implied that he accepted bribes paid to influence his decisions and that he corruptly sold privileged access to a select group of Liberal Party donors. A trial was held to determine whether the allegations were defensible in March 2015 in the NSW Supreme Court before Justice Richard White, where Hockey argued that false allegations of the nature contained in the article, and the conduct of Fairfax during the proceedings, evidenced a malicious intent to smear his otherwise good reputation and consequently would justify the award of aggravated damages. Hockey was represented by Bruce McClintock SC. Fairfax was defended by Dr Matt Collins QC. In June 2015, the judge partially ruled in favour of Hockey, ruling that where the headline had been seen without the article, it was defamatory, and awarded Hockey $200,000 in damages. Fairfax was ordered to pay 15% of Hockey's court costs.

== See also ==
- WorkChoices – part of Hockey's portfolio as Workplace Relations Minister

Parliament of Australia
| Preceded by Ted Mack | Member for North Sydney; 1996–2015 | Succeeded by Trent Zimmerman |
Political offices
| Preceded by John Fahey as Minister for Finance and Administration | Minister for Financial Services; 1998–2001 | Succeeded by Nick Minchin as Minister for Finance and Administration |
| Preceded by Ian Macfarlane as Minister for Small Business | Minister for Small Business and Tourism; 2001–2004 | Succeeded by Fran Bailey |
| Previous: Jackie Kelly as Minister for Sport and Tourism | Minister for Small Business and Tourism; 2001–2004 | Succeeded by Fran Bailey |
| Preceded by Jocelyn Newman as Minister for Social Security | Minister for Human Services; 2004–2007 | Succeeded by Ian Campbell |
| Preceded by Kevin Andrews | Minister for Employment and Workplace Relations; 2007 | Succeeded by Julia Gillard |
| Preceded by Kevin Andrews | Minister Assisting the Prime Minister for the Public Service; 2007 | Title discontinued |
| Preceded by Chris Bowen | Treasurer of Australia; 2013–2015 | Succeeded by Scott Morrison |
Diplomatic posts
| Preceded by Kim Beazley | Australian Ambassador to the United States; 2016–2020 | Succeeded by Arthur Sinodinos |
Party political offices
| Preceded by Nicola Roxon | Shadow Minister for Health and Ageing; 2007–2008 | Succeeded by Peter Dutton |
| Preceded by Peter Dutton | Shadow Minister for Finance and Deregulation; 2008–2009 | Succeeded by Helen Coonan |
| Preceded by Julie Bishop | Shadow Treasurer of Australia; 2009–2013 | Succeeded by Chris Bowen |
