= Division of North Sydney =

Former Australian federal electoral division

Coordinates: 33.816°S 151.184°E

North Sydney Australian House of Representatives Division
- Interactive map of electorate boundaries from the 2016 federal election until its abolition in 2025
- Created: 1901
- Abolished: 2025
- Namesake: North Sydney
- Electors: 117,710 (2022)
- Area: 53 km^{2} (20.5 sq mi)
- Demographic: Inner metropolitan
Electorates around North Sydney:
Bradfield	Bradfield	Warringah
Bennelong	North Sydney	Warringah
Sydney Harbour	Sydney Harbour	Sydney Harbour

Footnotes

The Division of North Sydney was an Australian electoral division in the state of New South Wales from 1901 to 2025.

On 12 September 2024, the Australian Electoral Commission announced that the seat would be abolished at the 2025 Australian federal election, with its electors redistributed to Warringah, Bradfield and Bennelong. (Note: Lane Cove and Hunters Hill LGAs were transferred to Bennelong, the rest of North Sydney Council was transferred to Warringah, and most of Willoughby was transferred to Bradfield, although parts West of Pacific Highway and South of Fullers Road were transferred to Bennelong)

== History ==
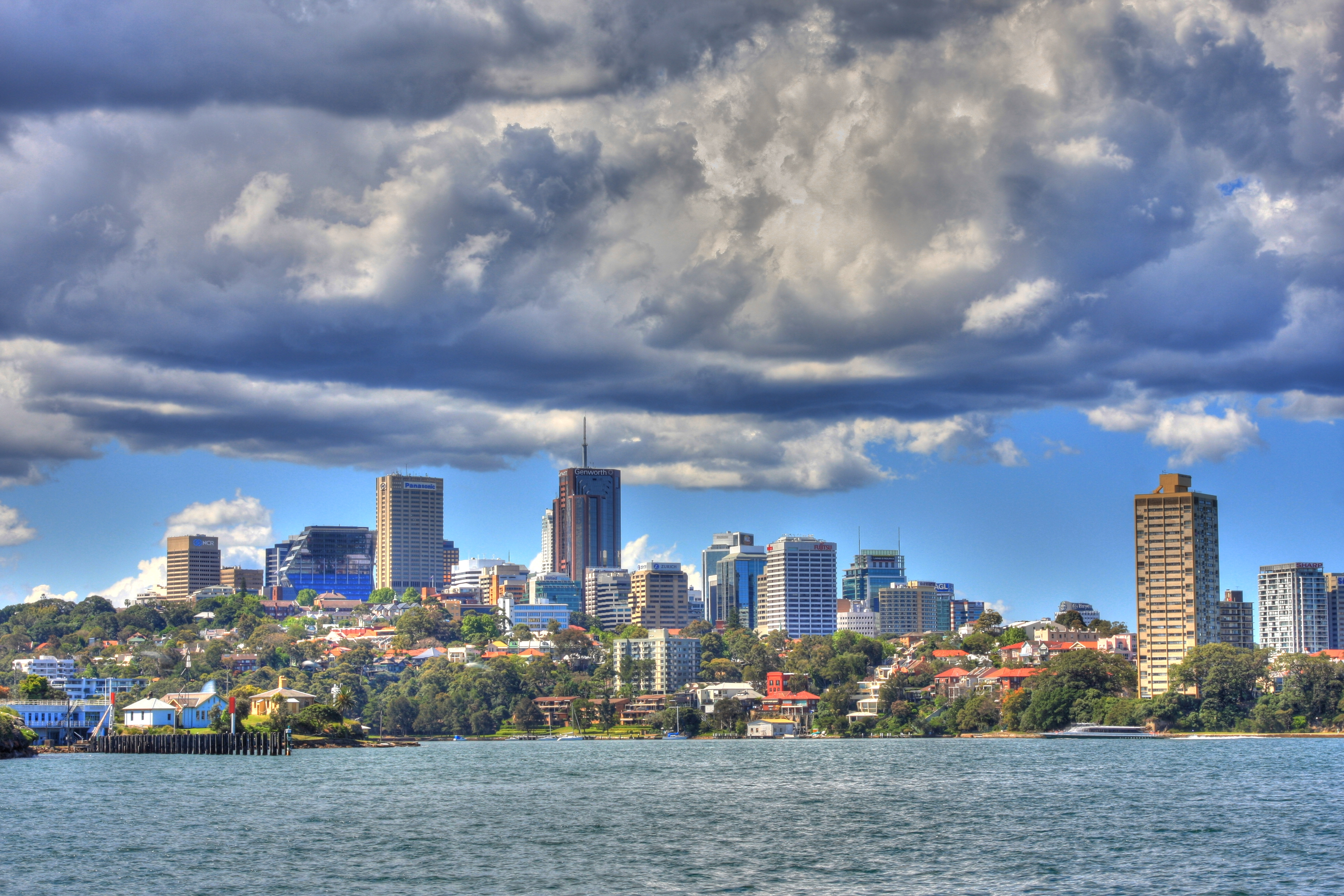
The suburb of North Sydney, the division's namesake

The Division of North Sydney was proclaimed in 1900 and was one of the original 75 divisions contested at the first federal election. It originally stretched as far as the Northern Beaches, though much of that area became Warringah in 1922.

At the time of the 2015 by-election, the Division of North Sydney had the nation's second-highest proportion (56.4%) of high-income families.

Prior to its abolition, North Sydney was one of only two (the other being Wentworth) federation divisions in New South Wales to have never been held by Labor. The Liberal hold on the seat was broken in 1990 by "father of the independents" Ted Mack, who had represented much of the area in state parliament from 1981 to 1988. He held the seat for two terms before retiring at the 1996 election, after two terms, for the same reason he previously chose to resign from state parliament after two terms − to avoid receiving a parliamentary pension.

However, during Mack's tenure, North Sydney was always on the stronger side of fairly safe for the Liberals in "traditional" two-party-preferred match-ups with Labor, and it was a foregone conclusion that it would revert to the Liberals once Mack retired. Indeed, when Mack retired in 1996, Joe Hockey reclaimed the seat for the Liberals on a swing large enough to revert the seat to its traditional status as a comfortably safe Liberal seat. Hockey held it easily until 2015, serving as Treasurer from 2013 to 2015 in the Abbott government. After Abbott was ousted as Liberal leader and Prime Minister by Malcolm Turnbull in the September 2015 Liberal leadership spill Hockey moved to the backbench, but six days later he announced his intention to resign from parliament, taking effect from 23 October. The 2015 North Sydney by-election was held on 5 December to elect his replacement.

Trent Zimmerman, a former Hockey staffer, retained the seat for the Liberal Party with 48.2 percent of the primary vote after a larger-than-predicted 12.8 percent swing against the Turnbull Coalition government. That was only the second time in North Sydney since federation that the successful Liberal candidate had not obtained a majority of the primary vote and had to rely on preferences. Zimmerman faced a double-digit primary vote swing − more than triple that of the 2015 Canning by-election − even though Labor did not even contest the seat.

The Liberal two-candidate-preferred vote of 60.2 percent against independent Stephen Ruff compares to the previous election vote of 65.9 percent against Labor. The reduction of 5.7 percent could not be considered a "two-party/candidate preferred swing" − when a major party is absent, preference flows to both major parties does not take place, resulting in asymmetric preference flows.

Zimmerman became the first openly LGBTI member of the House of Representatives. He won the seat in his own right in 2016 and 2019. However, in 2022, he lost over 13 percent of his primary vote amid the Liberals' collapse in the North Shore and other "blue ribbon" areas of metropolitan Australia, and was defeated by teal independent Kylea Tink, the second non-Liberal ever to win it. The swing against the Liberals was large enough to make the seat marginal in a "traditional" two-party contest between the Liberals and Labor for the first time in 60 years; on paper, the Liberal margin over Labor was only 1.2 percent.

The most notable member for the seat was Billy Hughes, Prime Minister of Australia from 1915 to 1923, and later a minister in the Lyons, Page, Menzies and Fadden governments. Hughes is the longest-serving parliamentarian in Australian history. He transferred to Bradfield after it was carved out of North Sydney's northern portion in 1949, and died as that seat's member in 1952. Other notable members include Mack, Hockey, and Dugald Thomson, a minister in the Reid Government.

As part of its periodic review of electoral boundaries, the Australian Electoral Commission abolished the division from the 2025 Australian federal election, with its electors distributed across the divisions of Warringah, Bradfield and Bennelong.

== Boundaries ==
Since 1984, federal electoral division boundaries in Australia have been determined at redistributions by a redistribution committee appointed by the Australian Electoral Commission. Redistributions occur for the boundaries of divisions in a particular state, and they occur every seven years, or sooner if a state's representation entitlement changes or when divisions of a state are malapportioned.

Located along Sydney's Lower North Shore, the division was named after the suburb of North Sydney. On its final boundaries, it also included the suburbs of Artarmon, Cammeray, Castlecrag, Crows Nest, Greenwich, Henley, Hunters Hill, Huntleys Cove, Huntleys Point, Kirribilli, Lane Cove, Lane Cove North, Lane Cove West, Lavender Bay, Linley Point, Longueville, McMahons Point, Middle Cove, Milsons Point, Naremburn, North Willoughby, Northbridge, Northwood, Riverview, St Leonards, Waverton, Willoughby, Willoughby East, Wollstonecraft, and Woolwich; as well as parts of Chatswood, Chatswood West, Cremorne, Gladesville, Gore Hill and Neutral Bay.

== Members ==
Image	Member	Party	Term	Notes
	Dugald Thomson (1849–1922)	Free Trade	29 March 1901 – 1906	Previously held the New South Wales Legislative Assembly seat of Warringah. Served as minister under Reid. Retired
	Dugald Thomson (1849–1922)	Anti-Socialist	1906 – 26 May 1909	Previously held the New South Wales Legislative Assembly seat of Warringah. Served as minister under Reid. Retired
	Dugald Thomson (1849–1922)	Liberal	26 May 1909 – 19 February 1910	Previously held the New South Wales Legislative Assembly seat of Warringah. Served as minister under Reid. Retired
	George Edwards (1855–1911)	Liberal	13 April 1910 – 4 February 1911	Previously held the Division of South Sydney. Died in office
	(Sir) Granville Ryrie (1865–1937)	Liberal	11 March 1911 – 17 February 1917	Previously held the New South Wales Legislative Assembly seat of Queanbeyan. Transferred to the Division of Warringah
	(Sir) Granville Ryrie (1865–1937)	Nationalist	17 February 1917 – 16 December 1922	Previously held the New South Wales Legislative Assembly seat of Queanbeyan. Transferred to the Division of Warringah
	Billy Hughes (1862–1952)	Nationalist	16 December 1922 – 22 August 1929	Previously held the Division of Bendigo. Served as Prime Minister from 1915 to 1923. Served as minister under Lyons, Page, Menzies and Fadden. Served as leader of the United Australia Party from 1941 to 1943. Transferred to the Division of Bradfield
	Billy Hughes (1862–1952)	Independent Nationalist	22 August 1929 – 2 December 1929	Previously held the Division of Bendigo. Served as Prime Minister from 1915 to 1923. Served as minister under Lyons, Page, Menzies and Fadden. Served as leader of the United Australia Party from 1941 to 1943. Transferred to the Division of Bradfield
	Billy Hughes (1862–1952)	Australian	2 December 1929 – 7 May 1931	Previously held the Division of Bendigo. Served as Prime Minister from 1915 to 1923. Served as minister under Lyons, Page, Menzies and Fadden. Served as leader of the United Australia Party from 1941 to 1943. Transferred to the Division of Bradfield
	Billy Hughes (1862–1952)	United Australia	7 May 1931 – 14 April 1944	Previously held the Division of Bendigo. Served as Prime Minister from 1915 to 1923. Served as minister under Lyons, Page, Menzies and Fadden. Served as leader of the United Australia Party from 1941 to 1943. Transferred to the Division of Bradfield
	Billy Hughes (1862–1952)	Independent	14 April 1944 – 13 September 1945	Previously held the Division of Bendigo. Served as Prime Minister from 1915 to 1923. Served as minister under Lyons, Page, Menzies and Fadden. Served as leader of the United Australia Party from 1941 to 1943. Transferred to the Division of Bradfield
	Billy Hughes (1862–1952)	Liberal	13 September 1945 – 10 December 1949	Previously held the Division of Bendigo. Served as Prime Minister from 1915 to 1923. Served as minister under Lyons, Page, Menzies and Fadden. Served as leader of the United Australia Party from 1941 to 1943. Transferred to the Division of Bradfield
	William Jack (1890–1982)	Liberal	10 December 1949 – 31 October 1966	Retired
	Bill Graham (1919–1995)	Liberal	26 November 1966 – 19 September 1980	Previously held the Division of St George. Retired
	John Spender (1935–2022)	Liberal	18 October 1980 – 24 March 1990	Lost seat
	Ted Mack (1933–2018)	Independent	24 March 1990 – 29 January 1996	Previously held the New South Wales Legislative Assembly seat of North Shore. Retired
	Joe Hockey (1965–)	Liberal	2 March 1996 – 23 October 2015	Served as minister under Howard and Abbott. Resigned to retire from politics
	Trent Zimmerman (1968–)	Liberal	5 December 2015 – 21 May 2022	Lost seat. First openly LGBTI member of the House of Representatives
	Kylea Tink (1970–)	Independent	21 May 2022 – 28 March 2025	Retired after North Sydney was abolished in 2025

== Election results ==
2022 Australian federal election: North Sydney
Party	Candidate	Votes	%	±%
Liberal	Trent Zimmerman	36,956	38.05	−13.91
Independent	Kylea Tink	24,477	25.20	+25.20
Labor	Catherine Renshaw	20,835	21.45	−3.63
Greens	Heather Armstrong	8,308	8.55	−5.07
United Australia	Robert Nalbandian	1,730	1.78	+0.49
Sustainable Australia	William Bourke	1,163	1.20	−0.69
One Nation	Michael Walls	1,149	1.18	+1.18
Liberal Democrats	Dajen Tinkler	1,123	1.16	+1.16
TNL	Victor Kline	886	0.91	+0.91
Informed Medical Options	Lesley Kinney	491	0.51	+0.51
Total formal votes		97,118	94.98	−0.98
Informal votes		5,138	5.02	+0.98
Turnout		102,256	91.55	−0.85
Notional two-party-preferred count
Liberal	Trent Zimmerman	49,781	51.26	−8.01
Labor	Catherine Renshaw	47,337	48.74	+8.01
Two-candidate-preferred result
Independent	Kylea Tink	51,392	52.92	+52.92
Liberal	Trent Zimmerman	45,726	47.08	−12.19
Independent gain from Liberal				

Alluvial diagram for preference flows in the seat of North Sydney in the 2022 federal election. indicates at what stage the winning candidate had over 50% of the votes and was declared the winner.
