= Ted Mack (politician) =

Australian politician

39th Mayor of North Sydney
- In office 29 September 1980 – 4 October 1988
- Deputy: Peter Tranter; Neil Hartley; Mark Singer; Neil Hartley
- Preceded by: Carole Baker
- Succeeded by: Neil Hartley (acting)

Alderman of the Municipality of North Sydney for Kirribilli Ward
- In office 21 September 1974 – 26 September 1987

Alderman of the Municipality of North Sydney for East Ward
- In office 26 September 1987 – 4 October 1988

Member of the New South Wales Parliament for North Shore
- In office 19 September 1981 – 16 September 1988
- Preceded by: New District
- Succeeded by: Robyn Read

Member of the Australian Parliament for North Sydney
- In office 24 March 1990 – 2 March 1996
- Preceded by: John Spender
- Succeeded by: Joe Hockey

Personal details
- Born: Edward Carrington Mack; 20 December 1933 Paddington, New South Wales, Australia
- Died: 6 November 2018 (aged 84) Sydney, New South Wales, Australia
- Party: Independent
- Spouse: Wendy
- Education: University of New South Wales
- Profession: Architect

Edward Carrington Mack (20 December 1933 – 6 November 2018) was an architect and Australian politician. He is the only person ever to have been elected and re-elected as an independent to local, state, and federal government in Australia, and is often referred to as the "father of the independents". He chose to serve for only two terms in both the New South Wales state seat of North Shore and the federal seat of North Sydney to avoid receiving a parliamentary pension.

== Early life ==
Mack was born in the Sydney suburb of Paddington and educated at Sydney Boys High School, finishing in 1950. He completed national service in the RAAF in 1951–1952 at Albury. At the University of New South Wales, he trained as an architect, graduating with a Bachelor of Architecture in 1958. Following graduation, he married Wendy, with whom he has two daughters, one of whom is consumer activist Jenni Mack, and two sons. He and his wife travelled to Europe and worked in London 1958–61. Returning to Australia he worked as an architect mainly on hospitals and public housing until 1974 and in private practice until 1980. He supervised the construction of the Port Kembla district hospital (1961–63) and was later appointed as Architect-in-charge of Hospital design and construction at the NSW Public Works Department in 1966. In 1972 he was appointed as Assistant Chief Architect at the NSW Housing Commission. In 1975, he was appointed to a committee chaired by H.C. Coombs (former Governor of both the Commonwealth and Reserve Banks) to monitor and advise on Aboriginal housing in remote areas of Australia. Between 1974 and 1980, Mack was also employed as a part-time tutor at UNSW in architecture.

== Political career ==
Mack began to take an interest in politics in 1970 after the North Sydney Municipal Council approved construction of a 17-storey office block near his residence. He subsequently ran for election to the council in 1974 and was successful. He was re-elected as an Alderman in 1977 and 1980. He was elected by the council as mayor in 1980, 1981, and 1982. He was re-elected by popular vote in 1983 and 1987. He began his term as mayor by selling the mayoral Mercedes-Benz car to help buy community buses. For the next eight years he used his 1951 Citroen as the mayoral car at no cost to the ratepayers. He relinquished his private architectural practice on becoming mayor.

He introduced open government policies making all council meetings, committees and council files open to the public. There were no meetings of any sort from which the public or press were excluded while he was mayor. Public participation in decision making was created through the establishment of some 24 precinct committees, some 3000 public meetings and 36 referendums over his eight years as mayor. Under Mack's leadership the council decided all decision making is ultimately the right of the public not aldermen – irrespective of the merits of the public decision. He initiated a policy of raising funds from sources other than rates, with the result that rates fell from 66% of council's income in 1980 to 38% in 1987. In that year North Sydney was named as the top Sydney council in an independent financial analysis. This enabled the council to establish a large public works program without using rates or loans to fund it. The works program consisted of several new and renovated parks, four multi-storey car parks, four new childcare facilities, four renovated community centres and one major new community centre, four new tennis centres, two renovated public swimming pools, major library extensions, major renovations to North Sydney Oval, over one hundred new public housing dwellings (funded by the State Government), major streetscape improvements throughout the municipality, seats, signs, footpaths, lighting, forty bus shelters, some 50,000 street trees and a substantial number of commercial and retail establishments providing an income stream for council. Mack ensured that his name was not on any of the opening plaques for these facilities. He received a 90% vote at the 1987 mayoral election.

In 1981, he decided to run as an independent for the newly created New South Wales Legislative Assembly seat of North Shore, based in North Sydney. On paper, it was a comfortably safe Liberal seat; the North Shore has been the power base for the Liberals (and their predecessors) in Sydney for over a century. Mack nominated for North Shore after noticing that on its boundaries, the newly created North Shore was virtually coextensive with the Municipality of North Sydney. Mack considered that being both mayor and state member for electorates that covered nearly identical boundaries would make both positions more effective. His opponent was state opposition leader Bruce McDonald. After the first count on election night he pushed the Labor candidate into third place, and ultimately defeated McDonald on Labor preferences—one of the few times a major-party leader has been defeated at any level in Australia. Mack did not accept a mayoral allowance for the next seven years. He was returned by comfortable margins in 1984 and 1988, the latter election coming as the Coalition won government in a landslide. Shortly after his 1988 victory, he abruptly retired from all of his offices. He did so just two days short of serving seven years in parliament, which would have made him eligible for parliamentary pension entitlements in excess of $1,000,000. Mack had always taken a dim view of what he perceived as the excesses of public political office, and decided to retire in protest. His retirement from both local and state government resulted in three by-elections for North Sydney ward alderman, North Sydney mayor and state member for North Shore. All three people he recommended for these positions were elected.

Despite living nearby, for a time, he refused to travel across the Sydney Harbour Bridge or through the Sydney Harbour Tunnel in protest at the secret contract and awarding of all tolls to Kumagai Transfield for 30 years.

== Federal politics ==
After 18 months out of politics, mainly spent camping in the outback, Mack achieved even broader fame by winning the federal seat of North Sydney in 1990. The seat had long been regarded as a blue-ribbon Liberal seat; it had been held by the Liberals or their predecessors since Federation. However, Mack defeated incumbent Liberal MP and Shadow Foreign Minister John Spender on a large swing. Mack led on the primary vote, while Spender lost over 18 percent of his primary vote from 1987. He was elected on the fourth count after Democrat and Labor preferences flowed overwhelmingly to him. Mack was the First Independent elected since Sam Benson in 1966.

Mack was narrowly re-elected in 1993. During his tenure in federal Parliament, Mack opposed unilateral tariff removal, privatisations and was the only vote against Australian involvement in the Gulf War. In his speech on 22 January 1991, Mack said:

This war is about oil, because 40 per cent of the world's oil reserves are in this area. This war is about years of greed, of intrigue, of malevolence by local despots and the developed world. Saddam Hussein is a Frankenstein monster created over the last decade by the United States of America, the Union of Soviet Socialist Republics, China, the United Kingdom, France, Germany and other western European countries that supplied him with billions of dollars of armaments, and with the technology for chemical and nuclear warfare. France built Saddam's nuclear reactor. In the years 1983 to 1989, United States trade with Iraq increased from $571M to $3.6 billion. Only one month before the invasion, the United States Department of Commerce tried to push through a $7.6m deal to sell Iraq nuclear parts.

He successfully opposed the appointment of an Indonesian general involved in East Timor as ambassador to Australia. He also introduced a private member's bill for citizen initiated referendums as practised in Switzerland. He served on the transport and communications committee for six years.

Mack chose to retire from federal parliament at the 1996 election for the same reason he had previously chosen to retire from state parliament − to avoid receiving a parliamentary pension. When the Liberals held their preselection contest for the seat, they did not know at the time that Mack was leaving politics, and Joe Hockey won the nomination with very little opposition. It is widely believed that Hockey would have faced a more rigorous preselection contest had it been known that Mack was retiring. During Mack's tenure, calculations of "traditional" two-party margins pegged North Sydney as a fairly safe Liberal seat. In 1993, for instance, the Liberals would have held it on a margin of 9.5 percent, on the stronger side of fairly safe and just on the edge of being safe. It had been an almost foregone conclusion that it would revert to the Liberals once Mack retired. As expected, Hockey easily won the seat, and later went on to serve in various ministerial roles including Treasurer.

== Post-political life ==
Mack was elected as an independent Republican delegate to the Australian Constitutional Convention. He opposed the model favoured by the Australian Republican Movement. Along with Clem Jones, he was a director of Real Republic and was appointed to the official ten person "no" committee for the 1999 referendum.

In 1997, Ted Mack was elected as one of the one hundred "National Living Treasures", organised by the National Trust of Australia. After his retirement from federal parliament he was an occasional media political commentator, and was chosen to deliver the 2013 Henry Parkes Oration, held in Tenterfield and entitled "The State of the Federation".

=== 2015 North Sydney by-election ===
Ahead of the 2015 North Sydney by-election held on 5 December, Mack re-entered the federal political arena by announcing he would steer the campaign of independent candidate Stephen Ruff, which had the support of some disgruntled Liberal supporters. A senior orthopaedic surgeon at Royal North Shore Hospital, Ruff was a late entrant into the 2015 New South Wales state election for the North Shore state seat, and despite little financial resources and facing veteran Liberal incumbent Jillian Skinner, Ruff still managed a vote in excess of 10 percent.

Regarding the North Sydney by-election, Mack stated "I've never seen an election where a Liberal candidate is so disliked by such a lot of Liberal members and Liberal voters". Leaked emails showed potential voters were sent registration forms at 7:30 pm on a Thursday and asked to signal their availability, with the cut-off for replying by noon the next day, and additionally, advance notice of the email and cut-off was provided to Liberal candidate Trent Zimmerman's backers. It was claimed up to 550 Liberal branch members were unable to vote after the Liberal state executive pushed through a shortened pre-selection process to select Zimmerman, who was also head of the body that sets the rules for Liberal pre-selections, which has been claimed as a "complete conflict of interest". Mack also claimed that much of the electorate was angered that the outgoing Joe Hockey, who penned the "age of entitlement" speech, had forced a $1-million by-election within a year of the 2016 federal election, with the expectation of becoming the next Ambassador of Australia to the United States. Ruff was ultimately unsuccessful, coming second to Zimmerman with a 19 percent primary and 40 percent two-candidate vote. It was only the second time in the seat's history that the successful Liberal candidate did not obtain a majority of the primary vote, having to rely on preferences after a larger than predicted double-digit primary vote swing.

=== Health and death ===
In 2016, it was reported that Mack had commenced treatment for brain cancers following the discovery of multiple small tumours in his brain. Mack informed the media that the diagnosis was terminal. The inaugural Ted Mack Oration was hosted by North Sydney Council and delivered in March 2017 by Elizabeth Farrelly, a Sydney Morning Herald columnist and architecture academic at the University of New South Wales. Mack died after a stroke on 6 November 2018. On the first anniversary of his death on 6 November 2019, the Mayor of North Sydney, Jilly Gibson, officially renamed the park next to North Sydney Council Chambers as "Ted Mack Civic Park".

Civic offices
Preceded by Carole Baker	Mayor of North Sydney; 1980–1988	Succeeded by Neil Hartley (acting)
New South Wales Legislative Assembly
New district	Member for North Shore; 1981–1988	Succeeded by Robyn Read
Parliament of Australia
Preceded by John Spender	Member for North Sydney; 1990–1996	Succeeded by Joe Hockey
