= 1911 North Sydney by-election =

← 1910	11 March 1911	1913 →

The North Sydney seat in the House of Representatives
- Registered: 39,550
- Turnout: 16,210 (41.0%)
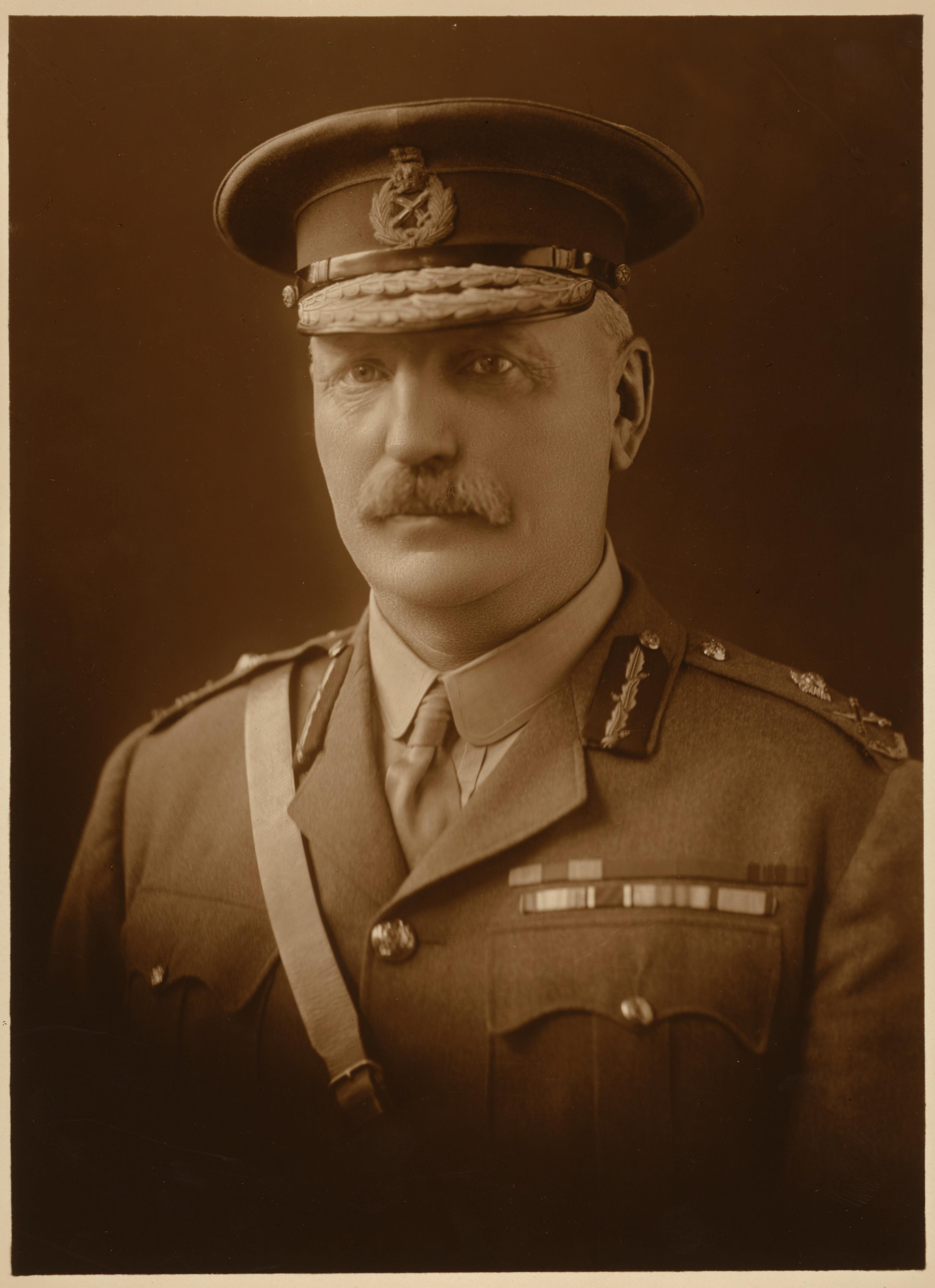

	First party	Second party
Candidate	Granville Ryrie	Stephen O'Brien
Party	Commonwealth Liberal	Labour
Popular vote	11,687	4,437
Percentage	72.5%	27.5%
Swing	▲7.3	▼6.1
MP before election
George Edwards
Commonwealth Liberal
Elected MP
Granville Ryrie
Commonwealth Liberal

A by-election was held for the Australian House of Representatives seat of North Sydney on 11 March 1911. This was triggered by the death of Liberal MP George Edwards.

The by-election was won by Liberal candidate Granville Ryrie.

== Results ==
1911 North Sydney by-election
Party	Candidate	Votes	%	±%
Liberal	Granville Ryrie	11,687	72.48	+7.32
Labour	Stephen O'Brien	4,437	27.52	−6.06
Total formal votes		16,124	99.47	+0.74
Informal votes		86	0.53	−0.74
Registered electors		39,550		
Turnout		16,210	40.99	−20.51
Liberal hold		Swing	+7.32	
