= Jillian Skinner =

Australian politician (born 1944)

Jillian Skinner AM
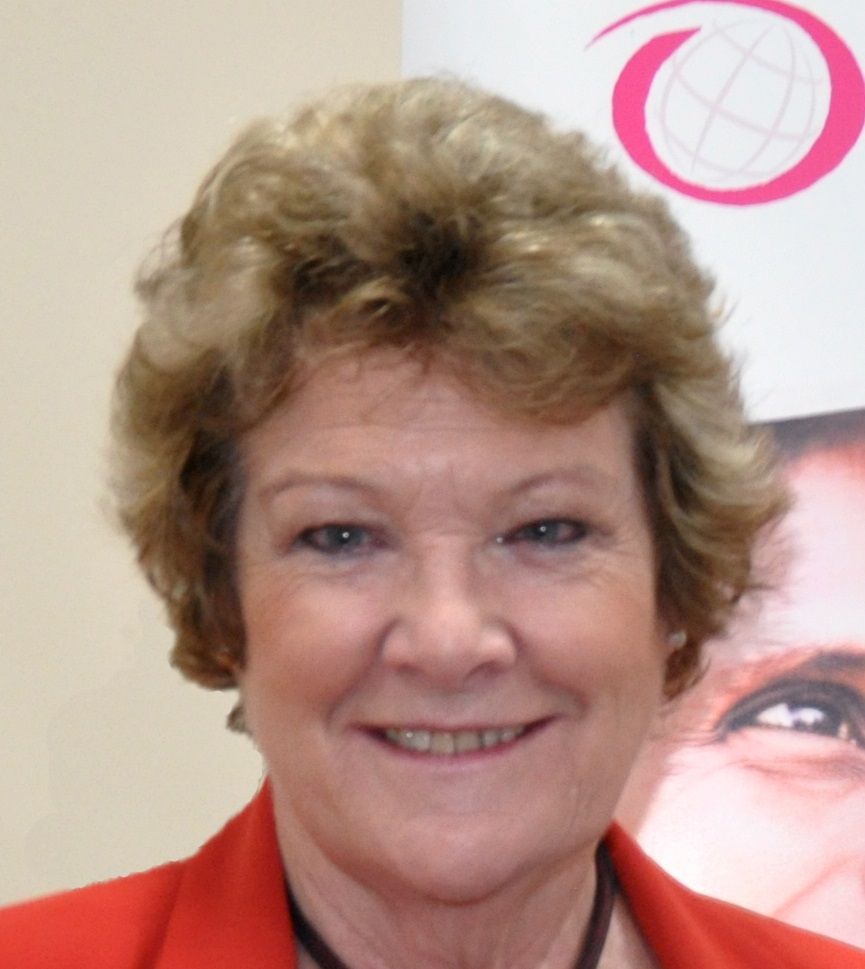

Minister for Health
- In office 3 April 2011 – 23 January 2017
- Premier: Barry O'Farrell; Mike Baird
- Preceded by: Carmel Tebbutt
- Succeeded by: Brad Hazzard

Deputy Leader of the New South Wales Liberal Party
- In office 4 April 2007 – 16 April 2014
- Preceded by: Barry O'Farrell
- Succeeded by: Gladys Berejiklian

Minister for Medical Research
- In office 3 April 2011 – 2 April 2015
- Premier: Barry O'Farrell; Mike Baird
- Preceded by: Jodi McKay
- Succeeded by: Pru Goward

Member of the New South Wales Parliament for North Shore
- In office 5 February 1994 – 20 February 2017
- Preceded by: Phillip Smiles
- Succeeded by: Felicity Wilson

Personal details
- Born: Jillian Gell Coutts; 5 August 1944 (age 82) Melbourne
- Party: Liberal Party
- Spouse: Chris Skinner

Jillian Gell Skinner AM (born 5 August 1944) is an Australian politician who was the New South Wales Minister for Health in the Baird government. Skinner was a member of the New South Wales Legislative Assembly representing North Shore for the Liberal Party from 1994 to 2017 and was the Deputy Leader of the New South Wales Liberal Party from 2007 to 2014. Between 2011 and 2015 Skinner also served as the Minister for Medical Research. On 27 January 2017, Skinner announced her intention to resign from the ministry and from Parliament.

== Early life and career ==
Skinner was educated at the Presbyterian Ladies' College, Melbourne. She began as a journalist working for the Melbourne Herald and later continued her career in Hong Kong, working for Radio Hong Kong and The Associated Press, Hong Kong from 1962 to 1973.

Upon returning to Australia, Skinner continued working as a journalist in Melbourne, including a period on the Parliamentary Press Gallery during the Premiership of Sir Henry Bolte, Sydney and Adelaide. She has lived in Sydney since 1979. From 1984 to 1988 she was involved in editorial writing, research, policy development and strategic planning. From 1988 to 1994 she was Director of the New South Wales Office of Youth Affairs. She is married with three children.

== Political career ==
Skinner joined the Liberal Party and became vice-president of the Cremorne Branch and gained preselection for the seat of North Shore at the 1984 election, and the 1988 election. However, she was defeated by the sitting independent member, Ted Mack.

When Mack resigned, Skinner again contested North Shore at the ensuing by-election but lost to Robyn Read, an independent candidate; Skinner gained 35 per cent of the primary vote.

At the 1991 state election Skinner did not contest for the seat of North Shore. Instead, sitting Liberal MP Phillip Smiles ran for the seat, after his own seat of Mosman was abolished in a redistribution. Although North Shore's demographics suggested it should have been a comfortably safe Liberal seat, Smiles was the first Liberal to win it, ending a decade of representation by independent MPs.

However, by late December 1993, Smiles was forced to resign from Parliament after being convicted of tax evasion. Skinner subsequently gained Liberal Party preselection for the ensuing by-election.

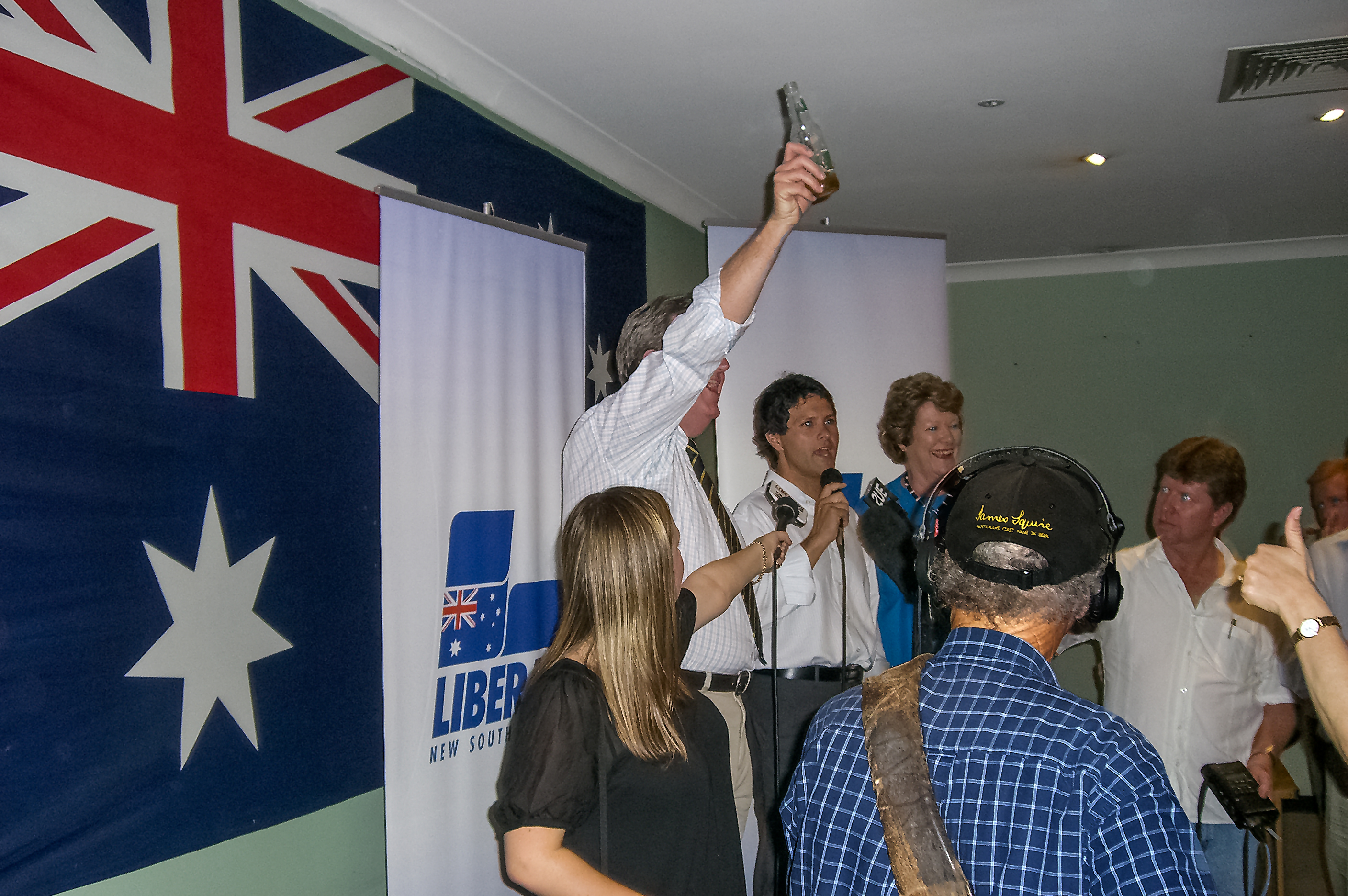
Skinner with Barry O'Farrell celebrates the 2008 Ryde By-election win, 18 October 2008.

On 5 February 1994, Skinner was elected as Member for North Shore with 54 percent of the primary vote and 58 percent of the two-party vote, defeating former independent member Read in a rematch. She was duly sworn in as a member of the NSW Legislative Assembly.

Skinner has never faced another contest nearly that close in this comfortably safe Liberal seat. For example, she secured a swing of 13.9 points at the 2011 state election and won 80.3 per cent of the two-party vote.

After the Labor party won the 1995 election, Skinner was appointed to the opposition frontbench and held various shadow portfolios over the next decade. Under opposition leaders Peter Collins, John Brogden and Peter Debnam, Skinner was Shadow Minister for Health (1995–2003, 2005-2011), Youth Affairs (1995–99, 2002–03), Arts (2003–08), Education and Training (2003–05), School Education (2005), Cancer and Medical Research (2006–07) and Science and Medical Research (2007–08).

Following the 2007 election, Debnam's deputy, Barry O'Farrell, announced he would challenge Debnam's leadership. When it became apparent that Debnam did not have enough support to fend off O'Farrell's challenge, he resigned, leaving O'Farrell to take the leadership unopposed. Skinner was elected Deputy Leader, and hence Deputy Leader of the Opposition. She retained the position of Shadow Minister for Health, which she has held from 7 September 2005 until the 2011 state election when the Coalition gained government.

Following the Coalition's landslide victory in 2011, O'Farrell announced that Skinner would be appointed to the cabinet as Minister for Health and Minister for Medical Research. When O'Farrell resigned as Premier in April 2014, Skinner opted not to continue as deputy leader under his successor, Mike Baird. She was succeeded by Gladys Berejiklian.

On 27 January 2017, shortly after Baird resigned and was succeeded by Berejiklian, Skinner announced her intention to resign from politics. She formally resigned on 20 February 2017.

Skinner was appointed a Member of the Order of Australia in the 2024 King's Birthday Honours for "significant service to the people and Parliament of New South Wales, and to community health".

== See also ==
- O'Farrell ministry
- Baird ministry
- Shadow Ministry of Barry O'Farrell

New South Wales Legislative Assembly
| Preceded by Phillip Smiles | Member for North Shore; 1994–2017 | Succeeded by Felicity Wilson |
Political offices
| Preceded by Carmel Tebbutt | Minister for Health; 2011–2017 | Succeeded by Brad Hazzard |
| Preceded by Jodi McKay as Minister for Science and Medical Research | Minister for Medical Research; 2011–2015 | Succeeded by Pru Goward |
Party political offices
| Preceded by Barry O'Farrell | Deputy Leader of the New South Wales Liberal Party; 2007–2014 | Succeeded by Gladys Berejiklian |
