= Electoral results for the district of Willoughby =

Election results for Willoughby, New South Wales, Australia

Willoughby, an electoral district of the Legislative Assembly in the Australian state of New South Wales. The district has had four incarnations, the first from 1894 to 1904, the second from 1913 to 1920, the third from 1927 to 1988, and the fourth from 1991 to the present.

== Members for Willoughby ==
First incarnation (1894–1904)
Election	Member	Party
1894	Joseph Cullen	Free Trade
1894 by	Edward Clark	Free Trade
1895	George Howarth	Free Trade
1898	George Howarth	Free Trade
1901	George Howarth	Liberal Reform
1903 by	Charles Wade	Liberal Reform
Second incarnation (1913–1920)
Election	Member	Party
1913	Edward Larkin	Labor
1915 by	John Haynes	Independent Democrat
1917	Reginald Weaver	Nationalist
Third incarnation (1927–1988)
Election	Member	Party
1927	Edward Sanders	Ind. Nationalist
1930	Edward Sanders	Nationalist
1932	Edward Sanders	United Australia
1935	Edward Sanders	United Australia
1938	Edward Sanders	United Australia
1941	Edward Sanders	United Australia
1943 by	George Brain	United Australia
1944	George Brain	Democratic
1947	George Brain	Liberal
1950	George Brain	Liberal
1953	George Brain	Liberal
1956	George Brain	Liberal
1959	George Brain	Liberal
1962	George Brain	Liberal
1965	George Brain	Liberal
1968	Laurie McGinty	Liberal
1971	Laurie McGinty	Liberal
1973	Laurie McGinty	Liberal
1976	Laurie McGinty	Liberal
1978	Eddie Britt	Labor
1981	Peter Collins	Liberal
1984	Peter Collins	Liberal
Fourth incarnation (1991–present)
Election	Member	Party
1991	Peter Collins	Liberal
1995	Peter Collins	Liberal
1999	Peter Collins	Liberal
2003	Gladys Berejiklian	Liberal
2007	Gladys Berejiklian	Liberal
2011	Gladys Berejiklian	Liberal
2015	Gladys Berejiklian	Liberal
2019	Gladys Berejiklian	Liberal
2022 by	Tim James	Liberal
2023	Tim James	Liberal

== Election results ==
=== Elections in the 2020s ===
==== 2023 election ====
2023 New South Wales state election: Willoughby
Party	Candidate	Votes	%	±%
Liberal	Tim James	23,032	43.6	−13.4
Independent	Larissa Penn	14,064	26.6	+17.6
Labor	Sarah Griffin	10,577	20.0	+5.3
Greens	Edmund McGrath	4,190	7.9	−3.4
Sustainable Australia	Michael Want	967	1.8	+0.1
Total formal votes		52,830	98.1	+0.1
Informal votes		1,014	1.9	−0.1
Turnout		53,844	89.3	+0.0
Notional two-party-preferred count
Liberal	Tim James	26,152	55.9	−14.8
Labor	Sarah Griffin	20,665	44.1	+14.8
Two-candidate-preferred result
Liberal	Tim James	24,727	52.6	−21.0
Independent	Larissa Penn	22,277	47.4	+21.0
Liberal hold		Swing	−21.0	

==== 2022 by-election ====
2022 Willoughby state by-election
Party	Candidate	Votes	%	±%
Liberal	Tim James	18,949	43.50	−13.53
Independent	Larissa Penn	12,920	29.66	+19.75
Greens	Lynne Saville	5,892	13.53	+2.36
Reason	Penny Hackett	2,576	5.91	+5.91
Sustainable Australia	William Bourke	2,122	4.87	+3.24
Liberal Democrats	Samuel Gunning	1,104	2.53	+2.53
Total formal votes		43,563	98.43	+0.34
Informal votes		697	1.57	−0.34
Turnout		44,260	80.49	−9.02
Two-candidate-preferred result
Liberal	Tim James	19,886	53.30	−20.45
Independent	Larissa Penn	17,421	46.70	+20.45
Liberal hold		Swing	−20.45	

The two-candidate swing from the 2019 general election is calculated from the NSW Electoral Commission Two Candidate Preferred (TCP) Analytical Tool for Berejiklian (LIB) vs Penn (IND).

=== Elections in the 2010s ===
==== 2019 ====
2019 New South Wales state election: Willoughby
Party	Candidate	Votes	%	±%
Liberal	Gladys Berejiklian	27,292	57.03	−6.52
Labor	Justin Reiss	6,875	14.37	−1.50
Greens	Daniel Keogh	5,342	11.16	−4.71
Independent	Larissa Penn	4,742	9.91	+9.91
Keep Sydney Open	Tom Crowley	1,403	2.93	+2.93
Animal Justice	Emma Bennett	1,040	2.17	+2.17
Sustainable Australia	Greg Graham	779	1.63	+1.63
Flux	Meow-Ludo Meow-Meow	384	0.80	+0.80
Total formal votes		47,857	98.09	+0.53
Informal votes		934	1.91	−0.53
Turnout		48,791	89.51	−0.87
Two-party-preferred result
Liberal	Gladys Berejiklian	29,142	71.03	−3.44
Labor	Justin Reiss	11,885	28.97	+3.44
Liberal hold		Swing	−3.44	

==== 2015 ====
2015 New South Wales state election: Willoughby
Party	Candidate	Votes	%	±%
Liberal	Gladys Berejiklian	30,066	63.6	−5.4
Greens	Alison Haines	7,511	15.9	−0.9
Labor	Peter Cavanagh	7,507	15.9	+3.8
Cyclists	Edward Re	845	1.8	+1.8
Christian Democrats	Melody Ho	719	1.5	−0.7
No Land Tax	Aldo Di Santo	662	1.4	+1.4
Total formal votes		47,310	97.6	+0.4
Informal votes		1,186	2.4	−0.4
Turnout		48,496	90.4	+2.3
Notional two-party-preferred count
Liberal	Gladys Berejiklian	31,481	73.8	−6.6
Labor	Peter Cavanagh	11,163	26.2	+6.6
Two-candidate-preferred result
Liberal	Gladys Berejiklian	31,324	74.5	−3.2
Greens	Alison Haines	10,739	25.5	+3.2
Liberal hold		Swing	−3.2	

==== 2011 ====
2011 New South Wales state election: Willoughby
Party	Candidate	Votes	%	±%
Liberal	Gladys Berejiklian	30,644	69.4	+19.2
Greens	Robert McDougall	7,260	16.4	+5.3
Labor	Chris Simpson	5,287	12.0	−3.2
Christian Democrats	Philip Brown	958	2.2	+0.5
Total formal votes		44,149	97.6	−0.1
Informal votes		1,108	2.4	+0.1
Turnout		45,257	90.7	+0.1
Notional two-party-preferred count
Liberal	Gladys Berejiklian	32,397	80.8	+9.8
Labor	Chris Simpson	7,723	19.2	−9.8
Two-candidate-preferred result
Liberal	Gladys Berejiklian	31,709	78.1	+13.6
Greens	Robert McDougall	8,883	21.9	+21.9
Liberal hold		Swing	+13.6	

=== Elections in the 2000s ===
==== 2007 ====
2007 New South Wales state election: Willoughby
Party	Candidate	Votes	%	±%
Liberal	Gladys Berejiklian	20,998	50.2	+13.5
Independent	Pat Reilly	7,456	17.8	−5.6
Labor	Linda Beattie	6,354	15.2	−6.5
Greens	Mike Steel	4,683	11.2	+0.3
Unity	Cherie Kam	1,189	2.8	−1.1
Christian Democrats	Esther Heng	699	1.7	+0.4
Democrats	Roy Day	478	1.1	−0.4
Total formal votes		41,857	97.7	−0.4
Informal votes		985	2.3	+0.4
Turnout		42,842	90.6	
Notional two-party-preferred count
Liberal	Gladys Berejiklian	23,717	71.0	+14.0
Labor	Linda Beattie	9,709	29.0	−14.0
Two-candidate-preferred result
Liberal	Gladys Berejiklian	22,679	64.5	
Independent	Pat Reilly	12,496	35.5	
Liberal hold		Swing	N/A (Note: The redistribution made it too difficult to calculate the Liberal-Independent swing.)	

==== 2003 ====
2003 New South Wales state election: Willoughby
Party	Candidate	Votes	%	±%
Liberal	Gladys Berejiklian	14,944	36.3	−14.5
Independent	Pat Reilly	10,237	24.8	+24.8
Labor	Imogen Wareing	8,703	21.1	−7.0
Greens	Mike Steel	4,361	10.6	+5.4
Unity	Sylvia Chao	1,595	3.9	−0.6
Christian Democrats	Leighton Thew	562	1.4	+1.4
Democrats	Caroline Mayfield	557	1.4	−6.2
Independent	Robert Butler	242	0.6	+0.6
Total formal votes		41,201	98.2	+0.5
Informal votes		769	1.8	−0.5
Turnout		41,970	89.3	
Notional two-party-preferred count
Liberal	Gladys Berejiklian	17,452	57.4	−3.7
Labor	Imogen Wareing	12,960	42.6	+3.7
Two-candidate-preferred result
Liberal	Gladys Berejiklian	16,607	50.2	−10.9
Independent	Pat Reilly	16,463	49.8	+49.8
Liberal hold		Swing	−10.9	

=== Elections in the 1990s ===
==== 1999 ====
1999 New South Wales state election: Willoughby
Party	Candidate	Votes	%	±%
Liberal	Peter Collins	20,327	50.8	−9.2
Labor	Luke Brasch	11,262	28.1	+4.9
Democrats	Bryan McGuire	3,048	7.6	−0.8
Greens	Bronwyn Brown	2,090	5.2	+3.8
Unity	Cheryl Wong	1,816	4.5	+4.5
One Nation	Heinz Markuse	895	2.2	+2.2
AAFI	Douglas McCallum	321	0.8	−3.6
Earthsave	Jennifer Aukim	277	0.7	+0.7
Total formal votes		40,036	97.7	+2.3
Informal votes		954	2.3	−2.3
Turnout		40,990	91.5	
Two-party-preferred result
Liberal	Peter Collins	21,891	61.1	−7.7
Labor	Luke Brasch	13,965	38.9	+7.7
Liberal hold		Swing	−7.7	

==== 1995 ====
1995 New South Wales state election: Willoughby
Party	Candidate	Votes	%	±%
Liberal	Peter Collins	20,775	62.2	+4.9
Labor	Daniel Reiss	7,711	23.1	+10.5
Democrats	Peter Fraser	3,030	9.1	+6.2
AAFI	Michael Wiseham	1,866	5.6	+5.6
Total formal votes		33,382	95.2	+2.1
Informal votes		1,692	4.8	−2.1
Turnout		35,074	92.0	
Two-party-preferred result
Liberal	Peter Collins	22,522	70.0	+8.0
Labor	Daniel Reiss	9,654	30.0	+30.0
Liberal hold		Swing	+8.0	

==== 1991 ====
1991 New South Wales state election: Willoughby
Party	Candidate	Votes	%	±%
Liberal	Peter Collins	18,247	57.4	−9.2
Independent	Louise Weingarth	7,942	25.0	+25.0
Labor	Daniel Reiss	4,010	12.6	−14.1
Democrats	Mary Harnett	903	2.8	+2.8
Call to Australia	Rosemary Moore	699	2.2	+2.2
Total formal votes		31,801	93.1	−3.4
Informal votes		2,374	6.9	+3.4
Turnout		34,175	91.2	
Two-candidate-preferred result
Liberal	Peter Collins	18,777	61.9	−8.3
Independent	Louise Weingarth	11,536	38.1	+38.1
Liberal notional hold		Swing	−8.3	

Willoughby was a new seat with a notional Liberal majority.

=== Elections in the 1980s ===
==== 1984 ====
1984 New South Wales state election: Willoughby
Party	Candidate	Votes	%	±%
Liberal	Peter Collins	17,391	63.2	+13.3
Labor	Eddie Britt	8,974	32.6	−10.4
Democrats	Sean Turkington	1,154	4.2	+4.2
Total formal votes		27,519	97.7	+0.8
Informal votes		658	2.3	−0.8
Turnout		28,177	91.7	+2.7
Two-party-preferred result
Liberal	Peter Collins		65.4	+11.7
Labor	Eddie Britt		34.6	−11.7
Liberal hold		Swing	+11.7	

==== 1981 ====
1981 New South Wales state election: Willoughby
Party	Candidate	Votes	%	±%
Liberal	Peter Collins	13,185	49.9	
Labor	Eddie Britt	11,370	43.0	
Independent	Kenneth Thomas	1,880	7.1	
Total formal votes		26,435	96.9	
Informal votes		856	3.1	
Turnout		27,291	89.0	
Two-party-preferred result
Liberal	Peter Collins	13,902	53.7	+1.5
Labor	Eddie Britt	12,004	46.3	−1.5
Liberal notional hold		Swing	+1.5	

The sitting member was Eddie Britt (Labor), however Willoughby had become notionally held by Liberal due to the redistribution.

=== Elections in the 1970s ===
==== 1978 ====
1978 New South Wales state election: Willoughby
Party	Candidate	Votes	%	±%
Liberal	Nick Greiner	10,456	39.8	−23.3
Labor	Eddie Britt	10,015	38.1	+1.2
Independent	Laurie McGinty	4,075	15.5	+15.5
Democrats	Christine Townend	1,748	6.7	+6.7
Total formal votes		26,294	96.9	−0.8
Informal votes		832	3.1	+0.8
Turnout		27,126	90.5	−2.0
Two-party-preferred result
Labor	Eddie Britt	13,359	50.8	+13.9
Liberal	Nick Greiner	12,935	49.2	−13.9
Labor gain from Liberal		Swing	+13.9	

The sitting member for Willoughby, Laurie McGinty (Liberal), lost preselection and contested the election as an Independent.

==== 1976 ====
1976 New South Wales state election: Willoughby
Party	Candidate	Votes	%	±%
Liberal	Laurie McGinty	17,417	63.1	+2.0
Labor	Eddie Britt	10,183	36.9	+12.7
Total formal votes		27,600	97.7	+0.3
Informal votes		642	2.3	−0.3
Turnout		28,242	92.5	+2.0
Liberal hold		Swing	−6.2	

==== 1973 ====
1973 New South Wales state election: Willoughby
Party	Candidate	Votes	%	±%
Liberal	Laurie McGinty	16,322	61.1	+4.5
Labor	Alwynne Pengelly	6,471	24.2	−3.9
Australia	Mary McNish	2,574	9.6	+1.4
Democratic Labor	Reginald Lawson	1,333	5.0	+1.4
Total formal votes		26,700	97.4	
Informal votes		723	2.6	
Turnout		27,423	90.5	
Two-party-preferred result
Liberal	Laurie McGinty	18,500	69.3	+4.5
Labor	Alwynne Pengelly	8,200	30.7	−4.5
Liberal hold		Swing	+4.5	

==== 1971 ====
1971 New South Wales state election: Willoughby
Party	Candidate	Votes	%	±%
Liberal	Laurie McGinty	14,180	56.6	−9.1
Labor	Eddie Britt	7,023	28.1	−1.0
Australia	Mary McNish	2,048	8.2	+8.2
Independent	Ida Carter	893	3.6	+3.6
Democratic Labor	Leo Eller	893	3.6	−1.6
Total formal votes		25,037	97.6	
Informal votes		625	2.4	
Turnout		25,662	91.9	
Two-party-preferred result
Liberal	Laurie McGinty	16,159	64.5	−5.4
Labor	Eddie Britt	8,878	35.5	+5.4
Liberal hold		Swing	−5.4	

=== Elections in the 1960s ===
==== 1968 ====
1968 New South Wales state election: Willoughby
Party	Candidate	Votes	%	±%
Liberal	Laurie McGinty	16,638	65.7	−5.0
Labor	Eddie Britt	7,364	29.1	−0.2
Democratic Labor	Peter Ledlin	1,328	5.2	+5.2
Total formal votes		25,330	96.5	
Informal votes		928	3.5	
Turnout		26,258	93.7	
Two-party-preferred result
Liberal	Laurie McGinty	17,700	69.9	−0.9
Labor	Eddie Britt	7,630	30.1	+0.9
Liberal hold		Swing	−0.9	

==== 1965 ====
1965 New South Wales state election: Willoughby
Party	Candidate	Votes	%	±%
Liberal	George Brain	17,897	70.7	−29.3
Labor	Eddie Britt	7,399	29.3	+29.3
Total formal votes		25,296	98.1	
Informal votes		490	1.9	
Turnout		25,786	92.5	
Liberal hold		Swing	N/A	

==== 1962 ====
1962 New South Wales state election: Willoughby
Party	Candidate	Votes	%	±%
Liberal	George Brain	unopposed		
Liberal hold				

=== Elections in the 1950s ===
==== 1959 ====
1959 New South Wales state election: Willoughby
Party	Candidate	Votes	%	±%
Liberal	George Brain	unopposed		
Liberal hold				

==== 1956 ====
1956 New South Wales state election: Willoughby
Party	Candidate	Votes	%	±%
Liberal	George Brain	15,682	72.0	+7.4
Labor	Anthony Coates	6,086	28.0	−7.4
Total formal votes		21,768	98.8	+0.4
Informal votes		271	1.2	−0.4
Turnout		22,039	92.9	−0.9
Liberal hold		Swing	+7.4	

==== 1953 ====
1953 New South Wales state election: Willoughby
Party	Candidate	Votes	%	±%
Liberal	George Brain	14,524	64.6	
Labor	Joseph McNally	7,949	35.4	
Total formal votes		22,473	98.4	
Informal votes		356	1.6	
Turnout		22,829	93.8	
Liberal hold		Swing		

==== 1950 ====
1950 New South Wales state election: Willoughby
Party	Candidate	Votes	%	±%
Liberal	George Brain	14,381	68.0	
Labor	Brian White	6,776	32.0	
Total formal votes		21,157	99.0	
Informal votes		217	1.0	
Turnout		21,374	93.7	
Liberal hold		Swing		

=== Elections in the 1940s ===
==== 1947 ====
1947 New South Wales state election: Willoughby
Party	Candidate	Votes	%	±%
Liberal	George Brain	14,615	63.3	+16.3
Labor	John McHugh	8,459	36.7	−3.3
Total formal votes		23,074	98.7	+1.0
Informal votes		301	1.3	−1.0
Turnout		23,375	96.0	+2.0
Liberal hold		Swing	+7.1	

==== 1944 ====
1944 New South Wales state election: Willoughby
Party	Candidate	Votes	%	±%
Democratic	George Brain	9,836	47.0	−12.8
Labor	Leo Haylen	8,365	40.0	−0.2
Liberal Democratic	Harrold Woodman	2,731	13.0	+13.0
Total formal votes		20,932	97.7	−0.5
Informal votes		487	2.3	+0.5
Turnout		21,419	94.0	+1.3
Two-party-preferred result
Democratic	George Brain	11,773	56.2	−3.8
Labor	Leo Haylen	9,159	43.8	+3.8
Democratic hold		Swing	−3.8	

==== 1943 by-election ====
1943 Willoughby by-election Saturday 25 September
Party	Candidate	Votes	%	±%
State Labor	William Wood	6,887	36.9	−3.3
United Australia	George Brain	4,757	25.5	
United Australia	Joseph Bales	4,074	21.8	
Independent	Hugh Milne	1,768	9.5	
Independent	Clarence Faulkner	479	2.6	
Independent Labor	John Osborne	439	2.4	
People's Labor	Augustus Fenwick	251	1.35	
Total formal votes		18,655	97.1	−1.1
Informal votes		557	2.9	+1.1
Turnout		19,212	83.2	−9.5
Two-party-preferred result
United Australia	George Brain	10,279	55.1	−4.7
State Labor	William Wood	8,376	44.9	+4.7
United Australia hold		Swing	−4.7	

Edward Sanders (United Australia) died.

==== 1941 ====
1941 New South Wales state election: Willoughby
Party	Candidate	Votes	%	±%
United Australia	Edward Sanders	11,825	59.8	
Labor	Francis Fulton	7,950	40.2	
Total formal votes		19,775	98.2	
Informal votes		363	1.8	
Turnout		20,138	92.7	
United Australia hold		Swing		

=== Elections in the 1930s ===
==== 1938 ====
1938 New South Wales state election: Willoughby
Party	Candidate	Votes	%	±%
United Australia	Edward Sanders	unopposed		
United Australia hold				

==== 1935 ====
1935 New South Wales state election: Willoughby
Party	Candidate	Votes	%	±%
United Australia	Edward Sanders	11,865	69.0	−2.3
Labor (NSW)	David Rees	5,327	31.0	+2.3
Total formal votes		17,192	98.4	−0.6
Informal votes		278	1.6	+0.6
Turnout		17,470	97.4	+0.3
United Australia hold		Swing	+2.3	

==== 1932 ====
1932 New South Wales state election: Willoughby
Party	Candidate	Votes	%	±%
United Australia	Edward Sanders	12,269	71.3	+29.9
Labor (NSW)	Richard Lynch	4,944	28.7	−10.9
Total formal votes		17,213	99.0	+0.1
Informal votes		170	1.0	−0.1
Turnout		17,383	97.1	+1.3
United Australia hold		Swing	+16.4	

==== 1930 ====
1930 New South Wales state election: Willoughby
Party	Candidate	Votes	%	±%
Nationalist	Edward Sanders	8,072	48.4	
Labor	Francis Burke	6,604	39.6	
Australian	John Forsyth	2,017	12.1	
Total formal votes		16,693	98.9	
Informal votes		182	1.1	
Turnout		16,875	95.8	
Two-party-preferred result
Nationalist	Edward Sanders	9,158	54.9	
Labor	Francis Burke	7,535	45.1	
Member changed to Nationalist from Ind. Nationalist		Swing		

=== Elections in the 1920s ===
==== 1927 ====
This section is an excerpt from 1927 New South Wales state election § Willoughby

1927 New South Wales state election: Willoughby
Party	Candidate	Votes	%	±%
Nationalist	Vernon Treatt	6,338	39.3	
Ind. Nationalist	Edward Sanders	5,831	36.2	
Labor	Richard Lynch	3,949	24.5	
Total formal votes		16,118	98.2	
Informal votes		301	1.8	
Turnout		16,419	86.7	
Two-candidate-preferred result
Ind. Nationalist	Edward Sanders	6,663	50.5	
Nationalist	Vernon Treatt	6,522	49.5	
Ind. Nationalist win		(new seat)		

District recreated

==== 1920–1927 ====
District abolished

=== Elections in the 1910s ===
==== 1917 ====
This section is an excerpt from 1917 New South Wales state election § Willoughby

1917 New South Wales state election: Willoughby
Party	Candidate	Votes	%	±%
Nationalist	Reginald Weaver	4,646	51.7	+20.6
Labor	John Chambers	2,398	26.7	−15.9
Independent	John Haynes	1,526	17.0	+17.0
Independent	Frederick Cowdroy	407	4.5	+4.5
Independent	William Shepherd	13	0.1	+0.1
Total formal votes		8,990	98.9	−0.1
Informal votes		96	1.1	+0.1
Turnout		9,086	63.6	−8.0
Nationalist gain from Independent		Swing	+20.6	

==== 1915 by-election ====
1915 Willoughby by-election Saturday 18 September
Party	Candidate	Votes	%	±%
Labor	John Chambers	1,753	42.4	−0.2
Independent Democrat	John Haynes	1,659	40.1	
Independent Liberal	John Wilson	269	6.5	
Independent Labor	Thomas Redgrave	232	5.6	
Independent	Edward Clark	216	5.2	+3.0
Australian Democrat	Michael Roland	4	0.1	
Total formal votes		4,133	98.0	−1.0
Informal votes		84	2.0	+1.0
Turnout		4,217	33.9	−37.7

A second ballot was necessary because no candidate had won an absolute majority.

1915 Willoughby by-election - Second Round Saturday 25 September
Party	Candidate	Votes	%	±%
Independent Democrat	John Haynes	3,491	56.8	
Labor	John Chambers	2,660	43.3	−8.3
Total formal votes		6,151	99.1	−0.5
Informal votes		56	0.9	+0.5
Turnout		6,207	49.8	−25.8
Independent Democrat gain from Labor		Swing	N/A	

Edward Larkin (Labor) was killed in action at Gallipoli.

==== 1913 ====
This section is an excerpt from 1913 New South Wales state election § Willoughby

1913 New South Wales state election: Willoughby
Party	Candidate	Votes	%	±%
Labor	Edward Larkin	3,805	42.6	
Liberal Reform	Frederick Fleming	2,777	31.1	
Independent Liberal	William McMillan	1,951	21.8	
National Progressive	Arthur Carrington	212	2.4	
Independent Liberal	Edward Clark	197	2.2	
Total formal votes		8,942	99.0	
Informal votes		89	1.0	
Turnout		9,031	71.6	
Second round result
Labor	Edward Larkin	4,908	51.6	
Liberal Reform	Frederick Fleming	4,601	48.4	
Total formal votes		9,509	99.6	
Informal votes		39	0.4	
Turnout		9,548	75.7	
Labor win		(new seat)		

District recreated

==== 1904–1913 ====
District abolished

=== Elections in the 1900s ===
==== 1903 by-election ====
1903 Willoughby by-election Wednesday 9 September
Party	Candidate	Votes	%	±%
Liberal Reform	Charles Wade	1,883	63.6	+5.7
Labor	Sydney Hutton	1,079	36.4	+25.5
Total formal votes		2,962	99.6	+0.2
Informal votes		12	0.4	−0.2
Turnout		2,974	61.3 (Note: Estimate based on a roll of 4,854 at the 1901 election.)	+1.5
Liberal Reform hold				

George Howarth (Liberal Reform) was made bankrupt.

==== 1901 ====
1901 New South Wales state election: Willoughby
Party	Candidate	Votes	%	±%
Liberal Reform	George Howarth	1,671	57.9	+10.1
Independent Liberal	Claude Leplastrier	902	31.2	
Labour	George Waite	314	10.9	
Total formal votes		2,887	99.5	−0.2
Informal votes		16	0.6	+0.2
Turnout		2,903	59.8	−4.8
Liberal Reform hold				

=== Elections in the 1890s ===
==== 1898 ====
This section is an excerpt from 1898 New South Wales colonial election § Willoughby

1898 New South Wales colonial election: Willoughby
Party	Candidate	Votes	%	±%
Free Trade	George Howarth	980	47.8	
National Federal	Joseph Cullen	578	28.2	
Independent	Herbert McIntosh	356	17.4	
Independent	William Brown	113	5.5	
Independent	John Roberts	14	0.7	
Independent	William Stoddart	10	0.5	
Total formal votes		2,051	99.7	
Informal votes		7	0.3	
Turnout		2,058	64.6	
Free Trade hold				

==== 1895 ====
This section is an excerpt from 1895 New South Wales colonial election § Willoughby

1895 New South Wales colonial election: Willoughby
Party	Candidate	Votes	%	±%
Free Trade	George Howarth	850	55.9	
Ind. Free Trade	Joseph Cullen	574	37.7	
Protectionist	William Richardson	97	6.4	
Total formal votes		1,521	99.2	
Informal votes		13	0.9	
Turnout		1,534	64.7	
Free Trade hold				

==== 1894 by-election ====
1894 Willoughby by-election Friday 30 November
Party	Candidate	Votes	%	±%
Free Trade	Edward Clark (elected)	453	39.5	
Free Trade	Joseph Cullen (defeated)	393	34.2	
Free Trade	George Howarth	301	26.2	
Independent	Hugh McKinnon (Note: Hugh McKinnon withdrew prior to the poll.)	1	0.1	
Total formal votes		1,148	99.2	
Informal votes		9	0.8	
Turnout		1,157	48.7 (Note: Estimate based on a roll of 2,374 at the July 1894 election.)	−15.6
Free Trade hold				

Joseph Cullen (Free Trade) resigned due to bankruptcy.

==== 1894 ====
1894 New South Wales colonial election: Willoughby
Party	Candidate	Votes	%	±%
Free Trade	Joseph Cullen	748	39.4	
Protectionist	Francis Coffee	491	25.9	
Ind. Free Trade	George Howarth	432	22.8	
Labour	Thomas Harper	127	6.7	
Ind. Free Trade	John Burns	86	4.5	
Ind. Protectionist	Robert Moodie	9	0.5	
Ind. Protectionist	George Davies	6	0.3	
Total formal votes		1,899	98.7	
Informal votes		25	1.3	
Turnout		1,924	81.0	
Free Trade win		(new seat)		
