= 1915 Willoughby state by-election =

Election result for Willoughby, New South Wales, Australia

A by-election was held for the New South Wales Legislative Assembly electorate of Willoughby on 18 September 1915 following the death of Edward Larkin (Labor) who was killed in action at Gallipoli.

== Dates ==
Date	Event
25 April 1915	Edward Larkin died.
26 August 1915	Writ of election issued by the Speaker of the Legislative Assembly.
2 September 1915	Nominations
18 September 1915	Polling day
25 September 1915	Second Round polling day
30 September 1915	Return of writ

== Candidates ==
The Liberal Reform Party chose not to nominate a candidate and Charles Wade, the Leader of the Opposition, encouraged Liberals not to vote in the election, stating "it would be almost indecent to launch a fierce party contest over the grave of a man who had given his life on behalf of all parties." Opposition to the Labor candidate was a source of controversy between Wade and the Premier, William Holman.

- John Chambers (Labor) was the selected Labor candidate and an official of the Tramway union.
- Edward Clark (Independent) had represented Labor, Free Trade and Liberal Reform for St Leonards and Willoughby, before becoming an independent and member of the Single Tax League since 1907. He was also an alderman of the North Sydney Council.
- John Haynes (Independent Democrat) had been defeated for pre-selection as the Liberal Reform candidate for the 1913 election and the Liberal Reform party was accused of providing covert support for him.
- Thomas Redgrave (Independent) was an alderman of Willoughby Council and was described by The Daily Telegraph as an independent labor.
- Michael Roland (Australian Democrat) was a baker from Newtown.
- John Wilson (Independent) was the general secretary of the Post and Telegraph officers association and was described by The Daily Telegraph as an independent liberal.

== Result ==
1915 Willoughby by-election Saturday 18 September
Party	Candidate	Votes	%	±%
Labor	John Chambers	1,753	42.4	−0.2
Independent Democrat	John Haynes	1,659	40.1	
Independent Liberal	John Wilson	269	6.5	
Independent Labor	Thomas Redgrave	232	5.6	
Independent	Edward Clark	216	5.2	+3.0
Australian Democrat	Michael Roland	4	0.1	
Total formal votes		4,133	98.0	−1.0
Informal votes		84	2.0	+1.0
Turnout		4,217	33.9	−37.7

A second ballot was necessary because no candidate had won an absolute majority.

1915 Willoughby by-election - Second Round Saturday 25 September
Party	Candidate	Votes	%	±%
Independent Democrat	John Haynes	3,491	56.8	
Labor	John Chambers	2,660	43.3	−8.3
Total formal votes		6,151	99.1	−0.5
Informal votes		56	0.9	+0.5
Turnout		6,207	49.8	−25.8
Independent Democrat gain from Labor		Swing	N/A	

== See also ==
- Electoral results for the district of Willoughby
- List of New South Wales state by-elections
