= 1903 Willoughby state by-election =

Election result for Willoughby, New South Wales, Australia

A by-election was held for the New South Wales Legislative Assembly electorate of Willoughby on 9 September 1903 because of the bankruptcy of George Howarth (Liberal Reform).

== Dates ==
Date	Event
21 August 1903	George Howarth was made bankrupt.
26 August 1903	Writ of election issued by the Speaker of the Legislative Assembly.
4 September 1903	Nominations
9 September 1903	Polling day
23 September 1903	Return of writ

== Result ==
1903 Willoughby by-election Wednesday 9 September
Party	Candidate	Votes	%	±%
Liberal Reform	Charles Wade	1,883	63.6	+5.7
Labor	Sydney Hutton	1,079	36.4	+25.5
Total formal votes		2,962	99.6	+0.2
Informal votes		12	0.4	−0.2
Turnout		2,974	61.3 (Note: Estimate based on a roll of 4,854 at the 1901 election.)	+1.5
Liberal Reform hold				

== See also ==
- Electoral results for the district of Willoughby
- List of New South Wales state by-elections
