= 2022 Willoughby state by-election =

- 12 February 2022

Electoral district of Willoughby in the New South Wales Legislative Assembly
- Registered: 54,988
- Turnout: 80.49% (▼9.02)

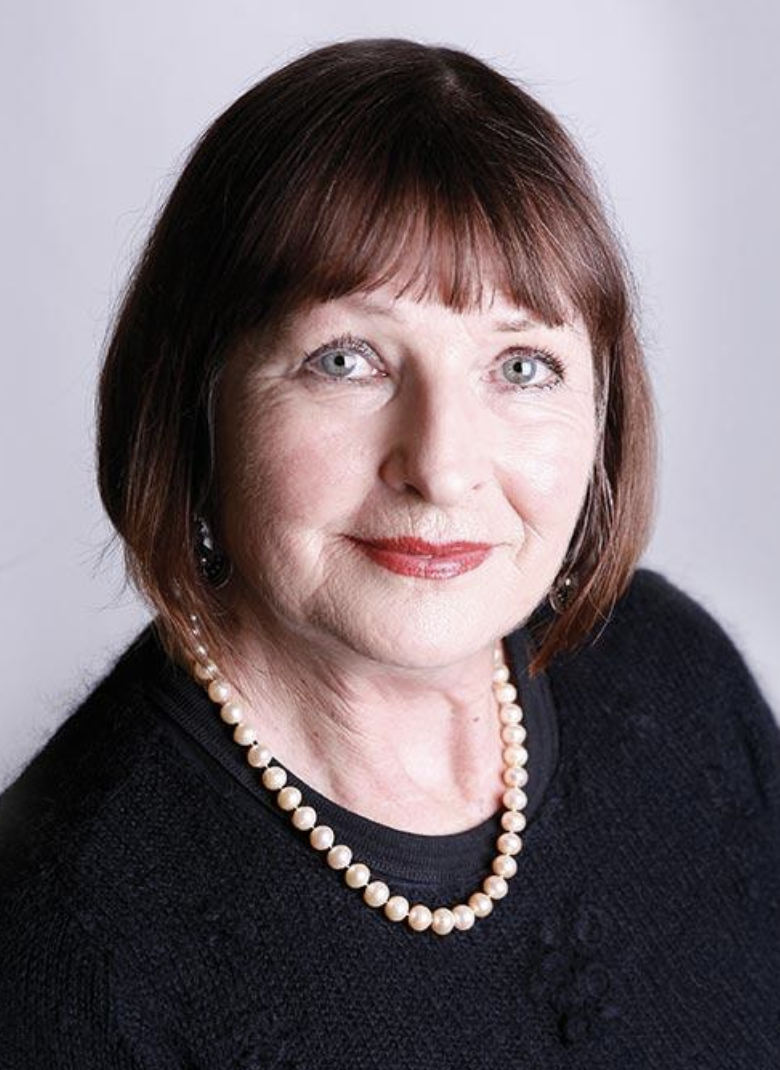
	First party	Second party	Third party
		IND
Candidate	Tim James	Larissa Penn	Lynne Saville
Party	Liberal	Independent	Greens
Primary vote	18,949	12,920	5,892
Percentage	43.50%	29.66%	13.53%
Swing	▼13.53	▲19.75	▲2.36
TCP	53.30%	46.70%
TCP change	▼20.45	▲20.45
MP before election
Gladys Berejiklian
Liberal
Elected MP
Tim James
Liberal

A by-election was held in the New South Wales Legislative Assembly seat of Willoughby on 12 February 2022, caused by the resignation of Premier of New South Wales and Liberal MP Gladys Berejiklian.

It was held on the same day as by-elections for the districts of Bega, Monaro and Strathfield. The writs for election were issued on 21 January 2022. Nominations for candidates closed seven days later at noon on 27 January, with the ballot paper draw commencing in the morning of 28 January.

The NSW Electoral Commission pre-emptively sent postal ballots to all voters registered on the state electoral roll for the relevant districts, under a regulation in a COVID-19 amendment to the Electoral Act. Postal votes were checked against in-person voting rolls to prevent double voting. The iVote online voting system was not used at these elections after the system failed during the NSW local government elections in December 2021.

== Candidates ==
Candidates are listed in the order they appeared on the ballot.

Party	Candidate	Background	Notes
Sustainable Australia	William Bourke	Founder and president of Sustainable Australia. Councillor and deputy mayor of North Sydney Council.	
Independent	Larissa Penn	Biotechnologist. Contested Willoughby at the 2019 state election.	
Liberal Democrats	Samuel Gunning	Former North Sydney councillor. Contested North Shore at the 2019 state election, and the federal seat of Wentworth at the 2018 by-election.	
Greens	Lynne Saville	Registered nurse and City of Willoughby councillor. Greens candidate for North Sydney at the 2022 federal election.	
Liberal	Tim James	Executive general manager of the Menzies Research Centre.	
Reason	Penny Hackett	Lawyer in private practice, funds management and investment banking and activist for voluntary assisted dying laws.	

== Results ==
2022 Willoughby state by-election
Party	Candidate	Votes	%	±%
Liberal	Tim James	18,949	43.50	−13.53
Independent	Larissa Penn	12,920	29.66	+19.75
Greens	Lynne Saville	5,892	13.53	+2.36
Reason	Penny Hackett	2,576	5.91	+5.91
Sustainable Australia	William Bourke	2,122	4.87	+3.24
Liberal Democrats	Samuel Gunning	1,104	2.53	+2.53
Total formal votes		43,563	98.43	+0.34
Informal votes		697	1.57	−0.34
Turnout		44,260	80.49	−9.02
Two-candidate-preferred result
Liberal	Tim James	19,886	53.30	−20.45
Independent	Larissa Penn	17,421	46.70	+20.45
Liberal hold		Swing	−20.45	

The two-candidate swing from the 2019 general election is calculated from the NSW Electoral Commission Two Candidate Preferred (TCP) Analytical Tool for Berejiklian (LIB) vs Penn (IND).

== See also ==
- Electoral results for the district of Willoughby
- List of New South Wales state by-elections
