= 1943 Willoughby state by-election =

Election result for Willoughby, New South Wales, Australia

A by-election was held for the New South Wales Legislative Assembly seat of Willoughby on 25 September 1943. It was triggered by the death of Edward Sanders (United Australia).

== Dates ==
Date	Event
10 July 1943	Death of Edward Sanders.
3 September 1943	Writ of election issued by the Speaker of the Legislative Assembly.
10 September 1943	Day of nomination
25 September 1943	Polling day
11 October 1943	Return of writ

== Results ==
1943 Willoughby by-election Saturday 25 September
Party	Candidate	Votes	%	±%
State Labor	William Wood	6,887	36.9	−3.3
United Australia	George Brain	4,757	25.5	
United Australia	Joseph Bales	4,074	21.8	
Independent	Hugh Milne	1,768	9.5	
Independent	Clarence Faulkner	479	2.6	
Independent Labor	John Osborne	439	2.4	
People's Labor	Augustus Fenwick	251	1.35	
Total formal votes		18,655	97.1	−1.1
Informal votes		557	2.9	+1.1
Turnout		19,212	83.2	−9.5
Two-party-preferred result
United Australia	George Brain	10,279	55.1	−4.7
State Labor	William Wood	8,376	44.9	+4.7
United Australia hold		Swing	−4.7	

== See also ==
- Electoral results for the district of Willoughby
- List of New South Wales state by-elections
