= Armenian Australians =

Ethnic group in Australia

Australian Armenians
Total population
- 22,526 (by ancestry, 2021)

Regions with significant populations
- Sydney and Melbourne

Languages
- Armenian, Arabic, Russian and Australian English

Religion
- Majority Armenian Apostolic Church, Armenian Catholic Church, Armenian Evangelical Church and Protestantism

Related ethnic groups
- Armenian Americans

Armenian Australians refers to Australians of Armenian national background or descent. They have become one of the key Armenian diasporas around the world and among the largest in the English-speaking world.

While the Armenian community in Australia is relatively recent compared to other Armenian diasporas, Australia's economic prosperity over the last couple of decades has attracted many skilled Armenian migrants. The official relationship between Australia and Armenia started on 26 December 1991, and diplomatic relations were established on 15 January 1992.

== Overview ==
The influx of Armenians into Australia has come from many different Diaspora countries; these countries include Armenia, Egypt, Iran, Lebanon, Syria, Jordan, Israel, Turkey, Ethiopia, Singapore, and India.

Today the Australo-Armenian community includes members born in up to and over 43 different countries. The main concentration of Armenians in Sydney are in the City of Ryde, followed by the City of Willoughby, and the City of Warringah. Smaller communities exist in Adelaide, Brisbane, and Perth.

== Organisations ==
All traditional Armenian diaspora parties have established in the country:

- Social Democratic Hunchakian Party
- Armenian Democratic Liberal Party
- Armenian Revolutionary Federation

There are also many associated political groupings like:

- Armenian Youth Federation of Australia
- Armenian National Committee of Australia

Other operating social and cultural organisations within the Armenian Australian community:

- Armenian General Benevolent Union
- Hamazkayin Regional Committee breaking down into sub-divisions/committees.
- SBS Armenian Radio
- Armenian Chamber of Commerce in Australia
- Homenetmen Australia
- Hye Hoki

Cultural centres

In Sydney there are several main cultural centres to which Armenians gather, one located in Willoughby, New South Wales named the Armenian Cultural Centre and another located in Bonnyrigg, New South Wales named the Armenian Cultural Panoyan Centre, and smaller Cultural Centres in Neutral Bay, City of Ryde, Frenchs Forest (Ararat Reserve) and Naremburn, Sydney. Melbourne also has several cultural centres.

== Education ==
Armenian is an accepted language in the NSW HSC. Also known as Armenian Continuers, the course is taught at Saturday schools or as a subject at full-time Armenian schools.

Armenian Schooling has become stronger throughout the Australian community with two full-time schools operating in Sydney. These are:

- Galstaun College
- AGBU Alexander Primary School

Alongside which a number of Saturday schools operate as listed below:

- Toomanian Armenian Saturday School
- AGBU Alex Manoogian Saturday School
- Tarkmanchatch Armenian Saturday School
- Serop Papazian Armenian Saturday School
- Looyce Armenian Catholic School

== Religion ==
Armenian Australian demography by religion (note that it include only Armenian born in Armenia and not australian with armenian ancestries)
Religious group	2021 (Note: Religious breakdown proportions based on "Armenian" ethnic or cultural origin response on the 2021 census.)		2016 (Note: Religious breakdown proportions based on "Armenian" ethnic or cultural origin response on the 2016 census.)		2011 (Note: Religious breakdown proportions based on "Armenian" ethnic or cultural origin response on the 2011 census.)	
Religious group	Pop.	%	Pop.	%	Pop.	%
Catholic	67 ▲	5.57% ▲	60 ▼	5.16% ▼	72	6.92%
Oriental Orthodox	423 ▼	35.19% ▼	498 ▲	42.86% ▲	444	42.65%
Protestant and Other christian	515 ▲	42.85% ▲	443 ▲	38.12% ▼	401	38.52%
(Total Christian)	1,005 ▲	83.61% ▼	1,001▲	86.14% ▼	911	87.51%
Islam	0	0%	0 ▼	0% ▼	5	0.48%
No religion	127 ▲	10.57% ▲	73 ▲	6.28% ▲	40	3.84%
Buddhism	0	0%	0	0%	0	0%
Hinduism	0	0%	0	0%	0	0%
Judaism	0 ▼	0% ▼	4 ▲	0.34% ▲	0	0%
Other	4 ▼	0.33% ▼	5 ▼	0.43% ▼	12	1.15%
Not stated	67 ▼	5.57% ▼	81 ▲	6.97% ▼	76	7.3%
Total Armenian Australian population	1,202▲	100%	1,162▲	100%	1,041▲	100%

Armenian Australian demography by religion (Ancestry included)
Religious group	2021		2016		2011	
Religious group	Pop.	%	Pop.	%	Pop.	%
Catholic	4,090 ▲	17.24% ▲	3,394 ▲	16.63% ▲	2,711	15.26%
Oriental Orthodox	8,079 ▼	34.06% ▼	8,309 ▲	40.72% ▼	7,814	43.98%
Protestant and Other christian	7,417 ▲	31.27% ▲	5,762 ▲	28.24% ▼	5,255	29.58%
(Total Christian)	19,580 ▲	82.54% ▼	17,465 ▲	85.6% ▼	15,843	89.17%
Islam	113 ▲	0.48% ▲	64 ▲	0.34% ▲	45	0.25%
No religion	3,354 ▲	14.14% ▲	2,065▲	10.12% ▲	1,196	6.73%
Buddhism	24 ▼	0.1% ▼	29 ▲	0.14% ▲	19	0.11%
Hinduism	11 ▲	0.05%	10 ▲	0.05% ▲	5	0.03%
Judaism	25 ▲	0.11% ▲	21 ▲	0.1%	18	0.1%
Other	41 ▲	0.17% ▲	33	0.16% ▼	33	0.19%
Not stated	576 ▼	2.43% ▼	712 ▲	3.49% ▲	513	2.89%
Total Armenian Australian population	23,722 ▲	100%	20,403 ▲	100%	17,767	100%

The oldest and largest Armenian church in Australia and throughout the world is the Armenian Apostolic Church, which in Australia is led by Archbishop Haigazoun Najarian who is the Primate of the Australian and New Zealand Armenian Apostolic churches and replaced Archbishop Aghan Baliozian. The Armenian Catholic community is led by Father Parsegh (Basil) Sousanian. there is also a presence of the Armenian Evangelical Church in Sydney and Melbourne in addition to the Holy Trinity Armenian Brotherhood Church and the Armenian Evangelical Brethren Church, both in Sydney.

- The Armenian Apostolic Church of Holy Resurrection is located in Chatswood, New South Wales.
- The Armenian Apostolic Church of Holy Trinity in Wentworthville, New South Wales.
- The Armenian Catholic Church is located in Lidcombe, New South Wales.
- The Armenian Evangelical Church is located in Willoughby, New South Wales.
- The Armenian Brotherhood Holy Trinity Church is located in Ryde, New South Wales.
- The Armenian Evangelical Brethren Church is located in Northbridge, New South Wales.

== Notable Armenian Australians ==
The Australian Armenian community has produced many notable figures who have become key members who shape the identity of Armenians in Australia. Below are a few of these members.

- Gladys Berejiklian – member of the NSW Parliament for Willoughby, Treasurer of New South Wales (2015–2017), Premier of New South Wales (2017–2021)
- Vic Darchinyan – Three-division world champion boxer
- George Donikian – Network Ten news presenter
- Brian Goorjian – Regarded as Australia's most successful basketball coach.
- Slava Grigoryan – classical guitarist, two-time ARIA winner.
- Joe Hockey – member of parliament for the Division of North Sydney (1996–2015), Treasurer (2013–2015), ambassador of Australia to the United States (2016–2020)
- John Kachoyan – Director and writer
- Yurik Sarkisian – Olympic silver medalist and two-time world champion weightlifter, set 17 world records during his career.
- Jano Toussounian – Australian/Armenian actor

== See also ==
- Armenian diaspora
- European Australians
- Immigration to Australia
