= 1894 Willoughby colonial by-election =

By-election in New South Wales, Australia

A by-election for the seat of Willoughby in the New South Wales Legislative Assembly was held on 30 November 1894 because Joseph Cullen (Free Trade) was forced to resign because he was bankrupt.

== Dates ==
Date	Event
20 November 1894	Joseph Cullen resigned.
21 November 1894	Writ of election issued by the Speaker of the Legislative Assembly.
21 November 1894	Joseph Cullen declared bankrupt.
27 November 1894	Day of nomination
30 November 1894	Polling day
6 December 1894	Return of writ

== Result ==
1894 Willoughby by-election Friday 30 November
Party	Candidate	Votes	%	±%
Free Trade	Edward Clark (elected)	453	39.5	
Free Trade	Joseph Cullen (defeated)	393	34.2	
Free Trade	George Howarth	301	26.2	
Independent	Hugh McKinnon (Note: Hugh McKinnon withdrew prior to the poll.)	1	0.1	
Total formal votes		1,148	99.2	
Informal votes		9	0.8	
Turnout		1,157	48.7 (Note: Estimate based on a roll of 2,374 at the July 1894 election.)	−15.6
Free Trade hold				

== See also ==
- Electoral results for the district of Willoughby
- List of New South Wales state by-elections
