= Armenian National Committee of Australia =

- Type: NGO
- Headquarters: 259 Penshurst St, Willoughby, Sydney, Australia
- Official language: English, Armenian
- Executive director: Michael Kolokossian
- Chairman: Khajaque Kortian
- Website: www.anc.org.au

The Armenian National Committee of Australia (ANC-AU) (Armenian: Ավստրալիայի Հայ դատի յանձնախումբ) is considered one of the largest and most influential grassroots organisation representing the Armenian Australian community in Australia. ANC-AU represents a total of 36 Armenian-Australian organisations with over 5,500 memberships, in addition to the broader Armenian-Australian community of an estimated 50,000.

ANC-AU works in areas of political and educational activities, including:

- Informing and influencing the Australian Government policy on affairs of interest to the Armenian-Australian community;
- Raising public awareness in support of an independent and united Armenia;
- Representing the collective Armenian-Australian community on public policy.

In February 2020, the signing of a Memorandum of Understanding by the Armenian National Committee of Australia (ANC-AU), Assyrian Universal Alliance (AUA) and Australian Hellenic Council (AHC) initiated the launch of the Joint Justice Initiative at Australia's Parliament House, calling for Australia's national recognition of the Armenian, Assyrian and Greek Genocides of 1915 as a priority on behalf of their communities.

Michael Kolokossian was appointed the organisation's Executive Director in June 2022.

== Executive Directors ==
Ordinal	Officeholder	Term start	Term end	Time in office	Notes
1	Tro Kortian	?	2007	?	
2	Varant Meguerditchian	2007	2012	4–5 years	
3	Vache Kahramanian	2012	2017	4–5 years	
4	Haig Kayserian	2018	2022	3–4 years	
5	Michael Kolokossian	2022	2026	3–4 years	
