= Gladys Berejiklian =

Premier of New South Wales from 2017 to 2021

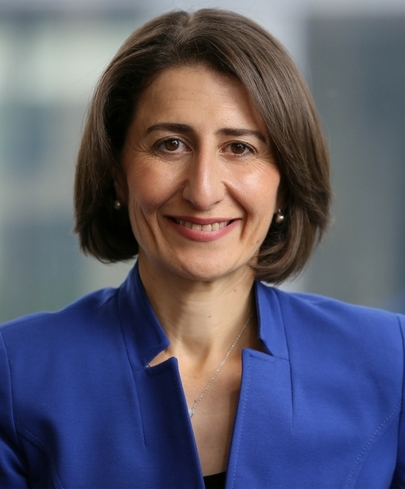
- Official portrait, 2017

45th Premier of New South Wales
- In office 23 January 2017 – 5 October 2021
- Monarch: Elizabeth II
- Governor: David Hurley; Margaret Beazley
- Deputy: John Barilaro
- Preceded by: Mike Baird
- Succeeded by: Dominic Perrottet
Ministerial positions
62nd Treasurer of New South Wales
In office 2 April 2015 – 30 January 2017
Premier	Mike Baird
Preceded by	Andrew Constance
Succeeded by	Dominic Perrottet
Minister for Transport
In office 3 April 2011 – 2 April 2015
Premier	Barry O'Farrell; Mike Baird
Preceded by	John Robertson
Succeeded by	Andrew Constance (as Minister for Transport and Infrastructure)
Minister for Industrial Relations
In office 2 April 2015 – 30 January 2017
Premier	Mike Baird
Preceded by	Andrew Constance
Succeeded by	Dominic Perrottet
Minister for the Hunter
In office 23 April 2014 – 2 April 2015
Premier	Mike Baird
Preceded by	Mike Gallacher
Succeeded by	Abolished
Party leadership positions
Leader of the Liberal Party in New South Wales
In office 23 January 2017 – 5 October 2021
Deputy	Dominic Perrottet
Preceded by	Mike Baird
Succeeded by	Dominic Perrottet
Deputy Leader of the Liberal Party in New South Wales
In office 17 April 2014 – 23 January 2017
Leader	Mike Baird
Preceded by	Jillian Skinner
Succeeded by	Dominic Perrottet

Member of the New South Wales Parliament for Willoughby
- In office 22 March 2003 – 30 December 2021
- Preceded by: Peter Collins
- Succeeded by: Tim James

Personal details
- Born: 22 September 1970 (age 56) Manly, New South Wales, Australia
- Party: Liberal
- Other political affiliations: Coalition
- Education: University of Sydney; University of New South Wales
- Occupation: Banker; Politician

Gladys Berejiklian (Armenian: Գլեդիս Բերեջիկլյան, romanized: Gledis Berejiklyan; born 22 September 1970) is an Australian businesswoman and former politician who served as the 45th premier of New South Wales and the leader of the New South Wales division of the Liberal Party from 2017 to 2021. Berejiklian currently works as an executive for the telecommunications company Optus.

Berejiklian became a member of the New South Wales Legislative Assembly after winning the electoral district of Willoughby in the 2003 state election. She was given the roles of Treasurer and Minister for Industrial Relations in the second Baird government, and Minister for Transport in the O'Farrell and first Baird governments. She was also the deputy leader of the New South Wales Liberal Party between 2014 and 2017. She assumed the role of premier after Mike Baird's resignation in January 2017. She was re-elected after winning the 2019 state election. In her second term, she led New South Wales's response to the COVID-19 pandemic.

In October 2021, Berejiklian announced her intention to resign as both premier and member for Willoughby after the start of an Independent Commission Against Corruption (ICAC) investigation to determine whether a "breach of public trust" had occurred, over her failure to disclose the secret relationship with Daryl Maguire when relevant to her ministerial duties, and her failure to report potentially corrupt statements Maguire made to her that were recorded in phone calls during the Maguire ICAC investigation. Berejiklian stayed on as premier until a replacement was elected at a party room meeting, held on 5 October 2021. Treasurer Dominic Perrottet succeeded Berejiklian as premier of New South Wales.

In 2023 ICAC findings stated that Berejiklian engaged in "serious corrupt conduct" by refusing to report Maguire's corrupt statements to her, but did not recommend criminal charges against her as ICAC evidence is not admissible in criminal court due to the loss of the right to silence within hearings.

== Early life ==
Berejiklian was born in Manly Hospital, Sydney, the eldest of three daughters born to Armenian parents, Krikor (1932–2022) and Arsha. Her grandparents were orphaned by Turkish soldiers in the Armenian genocide in 1915 and her father was born in Aleppo, Syria, where she still has family. Her mother was born in Jerusalem, Mandatory Palestine. Berejiklian spoke only Armenian until she was five years old, when she began learning English. She remains fluent in Armenian. She has remained involved in the Armenian-Australian community, serving a term on the Armenian National Committee of Australia. In 2015, she attended a commemoration ceremony in Yerevan for the 100th anniversary of the Armenian genocide.

Berejiklian attended North Ryde High School, which became Peter Board High School from 1986, a public, co-educational school in North Ryde. She was a member of Girl Guides and continues to support the organisation. She has a Bachelor of Arts (1992) and a graduate diploma in international studies (1996) from the University of Sydney and a Masters in Commerce from the University of New South Wales (2001).

== Political career (2003–2017) ==
Berejiklian joined the Liberal Party in 1993 and was president of the New South Wales Young Liberals from 1997 to 1998, being the third female president in its history. She also served as a Delegate to State Council (1996–2003), Urban Representative of the NSW Liberal Party State Executive (1997–2003), Campaign Director for State seat of Willoughby (1999) and Chair of Convention Committee (2002). Berejiklian also worked for Peter Collins and Senator Helen Coonan and the Commonwealth Bank as general manager, Youth Retail Banking and Government & Industry Affairs.

=== Opposition (2003–2011) ===
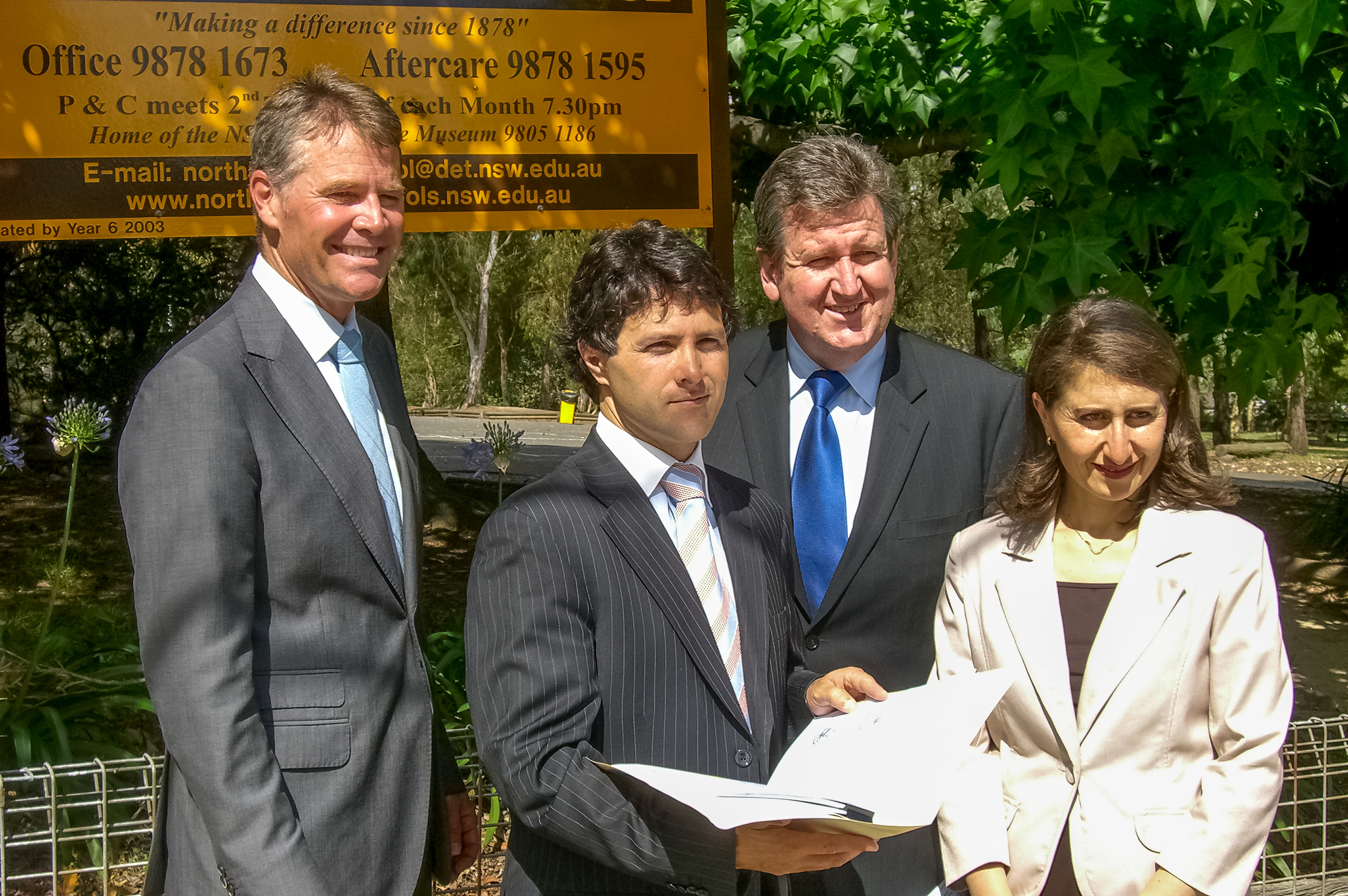
Berejiklian (right) with Andrew Stoner, Victor Dominello and Liberal Leader Barry O'Farrell in 2008

Berejiklian won Liberal preselection for Willoughby in 2003 when former Opposition Leader Peter Collins, who had represented the Willoughby area since 1981, decided to retire. Willoughby has historically been a comfortably safe Liberal seat even by northern Sydney standards; counting its time as Middle Harbour, it has been held by the Liberals, their predecessors or a conservative independent for all but one term since 1927. However, she faced a spirited challenge from Pat Reilly, the longtime mayor of the City of Willoughby, who nearly took the seat on Labor preferences. Ultimately, Berejiklian won by 144 votes, with the Liberals suffering a swing of 10.9 points. The swing was large enough to drop the Liberal margin over Labor to 7.2 percent, the closest "traditional" two-party margin in the seat or its predecessors since 1984. However, Berejiklian easily saw off a rematch with Reilly after picking up a healthy swing of 14.5 points, enough to revert Willoughby to its traditional status as a comfortably safe Liberal seat.

Berejiklian joined the front bench in 2005 as Shadow Minister for Mental Health and was appointed to the opposition front bench portfolio of Transport by Peter Debnam in 2006. Following the 2007 state election, she was given the shadow portfolio of Citizenship by Opposition Leader O'Farrell in his Shadow Ministry.

=== O'Farrell Government (2011–2014) ===
Following the election of the O'Farrell government at the 2011 state election, Berejiklian was appointed Minister for Transport on 3 April 2011.

Berejiklian restructured the railway system from July 2013 with RailCorp and its CityRail and CountryLink brands replaced by Sydney Trains and NSW TrainLink.

Notable projects include the extension of the Inner West Light Rail from Lilyfield to Dulwich Hill; the introduction of the Opal card; commencement of construction of the Sydney Metro Northwest. and closure of Newcastle railway line between Wickham and Newcastle to allow the Newcastle Light Rail to be built in its place.

=== Baird Government (2014–2017) ===
Despite receiving the support of Barry O'Farrell to succeed him, and despite having the numbers to win the premiership in a partyroom ballot, Berejiklian chose not to run for the leadership of the New South Wales Liberal Party. On 17 April 2014, Mike Baird was elected Leader of the New South Wales Liberal Party, and hence Premier, following O'Farrell's resignation, with Berejiklian elected as Baird's deputy. In a subsequent ministerial reshuffle, in addition to her existing responsibilities, on 23 April 2014 Berejiklian was sworn in as the Minister for the Hunter.

Berejiklian was appointed as Treasurer of New South Wales and Minister for Industrial Relations following a cabinet reshuffle announced on 1 April 2015 by Premier Baird, after the 2015 state election. As Treasurer, Berejiklian oversaw New South Wales's return to surplus. This was the first time New South Wales had been declared debt-free in more than 20 years. She also oversaw the part-privatisation of the state's electricity network.

== Premier of New South Wales (2017–2021) ==
=== First term ===
Following the resignation of Mike Baird as NSW Liberal leader and Premier on 19 January 2017, Berejiklian announced her intention to succeed him as the leader of the Liberal Party, and hence to become the 45th Premier of New South Wales. Baird endorsed Berejiklian as his successor, declaring that she would be "an outstanding Premier... No doubt about it." A deal was struck between the moderate, centre-right, and right factions of the Liberal Party, facilitating the moderate Berejiklian's rise to the leadership, with conservative Dominic Perrottet as her deputy. The next day, ministers Andrew Constance and Rob Stokes—Berejiklian's only serious leadership challengers—decided not to contest the leadership, and instead opted to endorse Berejiklian. This left Berejiklian to take the leadership unopposed at the ensuing leadership contest held on 23 January. She was duly sworn in as Premier later that day, becoming the second woman to hold the post. The first was Labor's Kristina Keneally, who served in the position from 2009 to 2011.

In October 2018, Berejiklian permitted advertising for The Everest stakes to be projected onto the sails of the Sydney Opera House (a move spearheaded by radio broadcaster Alan Jones), drawing widespread condemnation and criticism from many in the community, with a poll declaring that 80% of respondents opposed this decision.

=== Second term ===
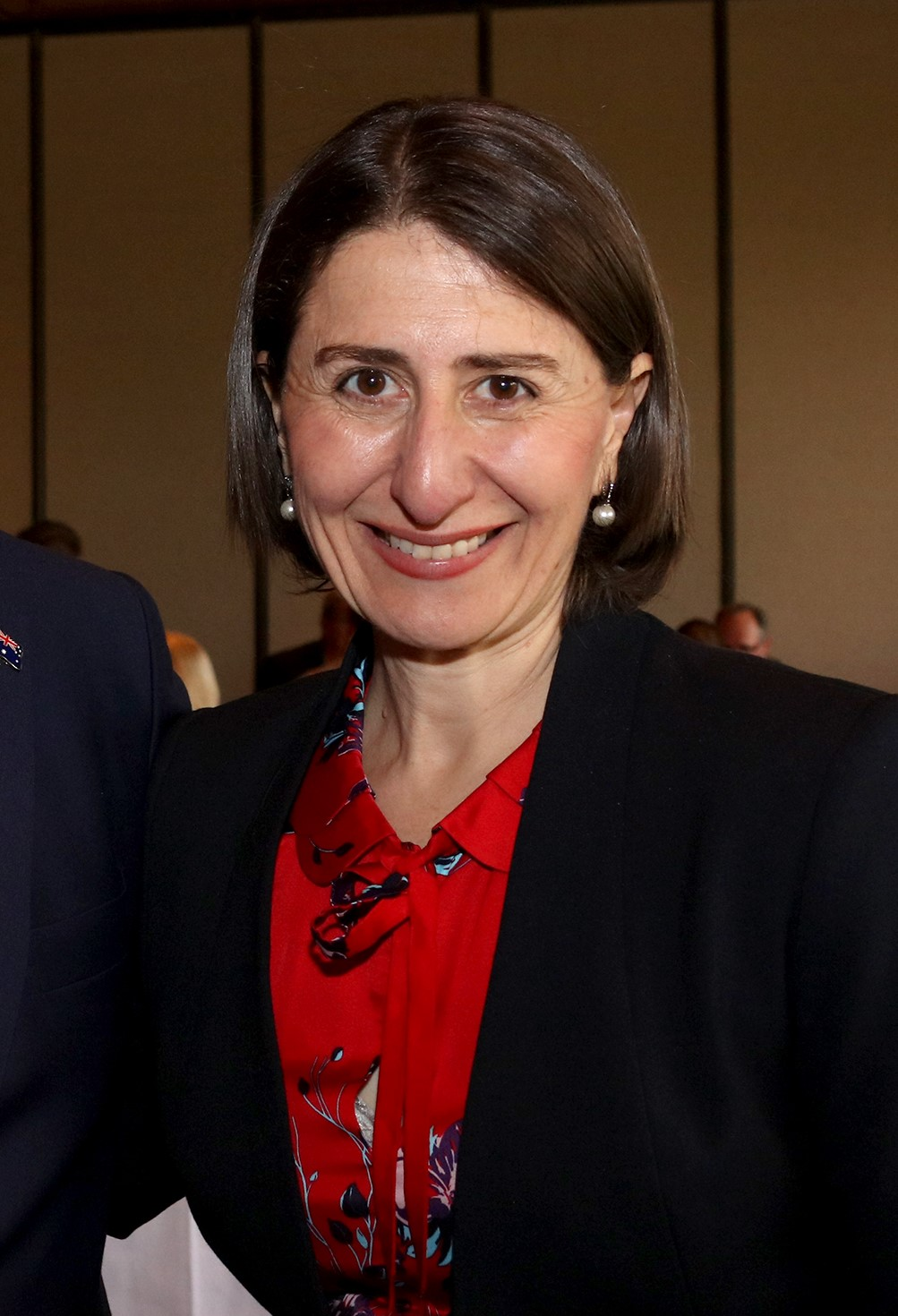
Berejiklian in 2019

Berejiklian led the Coalition into the 2019 state election, becoming the third woman to take a major party into an election in the state. With polls showing the race at a knife-edge, the Coalition suffered a swing of six seats, cutting its numbers down to 48 seats, a majority of two. This made Berejiklian the third woman to lead a party to a victory at a state election in Australia, after Anna Bligh and Annastacia Palaszczuk from Queensland, and the first non-Labor woman to lead a party to a state election victory in Australia.

In September 2019, Berejiklian expressed support for the Reproductive Health Care Reform Bill, a private member's bill aimed to decriminalise abortion in New South Wales. Berejiklian allowed a conscience vote on the bill in her party. Many conservative parliamentarians of the Liberal Party opposed the bill. Three of these parliamentarians, MP Tanya Davies and Legislative Council members Matthew Mason-Cox and Lou Amato, "expressed dissatisfaction with Berejiklian's handling of the bill". They had repeatedly asked Berejiklian to "intervene to stop the "fast-tracking" of the bill and establish a joint select committee into the legislation reform". However, their requests were rejected by Berejiklian. On 16 September 2019, the trio announced they would hold a party leadership spill motion against Berejiklian the following day. Senior ministers, including conservative ministers who opposed the bill, backed Berejiklian and condemned the actions of the trio. The right-wing faction of the party also clarified that they did not sanction the spill. The trio called off the spill the next morning, after the trio claimed to have received "further concessions" on amendments to the bill, meaning their amendments would be considered in the debate in the Legislative Council. The bill eventually passed Parliament with amendments on 26 September 2019 and came into force as the Abortion Law Reform Act 2019 on 2 October 2019.

In October 2020, as part of her evidence to an Independent Commission Against Corruption (ICAC) inquiry, Berejiklian admitted that she had been in a "close personal relationship" with Daryl Maguire from 2015 until August 2020. Maguire had been a fellow Liberal MP until a previous inquiry had heard that he had sought inappropriate payments, leading to his resignation in 2018. As a result, a vote of no-confidence was taken in parliament. She survived the vote in the lower house with 47–38, and in the upper house with 21–20, after a deciding vote from the Liberal president.

In November 2020, Berejiklian proposed changing Advance Australia Fair song, one word in the opening couplet, from "we are young and free" to "we are one and free", to acknowledge Australia's Indigenous history. in December 2020 Prime Minister Scott Morrison announced that he would be advising the governor-general to proclaim the change, to take effect on 1 January 2021.

Despite her high approval ratings, Berejiklian faced some scrutiny for her actions during the COVID-19 pandemic in New South Wales in 2021, which some have argued had an impact on the pandemic across Australia. In June 2021, Berejiklian resisted calls to enact a lockdown in Sydney, which, according to some media outlets, resulted in wide community transmission and over 20,000 cases of the highly transmissible Delta variant of SARS-CoV-2 in the community. Subsequent plans to reopen when 50% of the eligible population were vaccinated against COVID-19 were highly criticised by the public and did not go ahead. The decision to not prevent residents of Sydney regional and interstate travel resulted in the spread of COVID-19 to other states, including the Northern Territory, Western Australia and Queensland. It has been suggested that the Berejiklian government provided little clarity about which businesses can remain open and failed to answer questions if Louis Vuitton stores were essential and therefore could remain open. After public pressure and increasing coronavirus cases, the government released a list of authorised workers. On the day the authorised workers list was released the Local Government Areas (LGAs) of concern which already had the toughest restrictions in NSW had further restrictions such as night curfew put in place. The discrepancy in enforcement between different suburbs in the LGAs of concern attracted controversy, with some suggesting the restrictions were unrelated to the levels of transmission and rather, population demographics. Berejiklian also faced criticism when she stopped attending daily press briefings as COVID-19 cases, hospitalisations and deaths were predicted to peak.

=== Resignation ===
On 1 October 2021, New South Wales' ICAC announced an investigation into whether Berejiklian breached public trust or encouraged corrupt behaviour during her relationship with Daryl Maguire. With the ICAC announcement, Berejiklian announced her intention to resign as Premier and as a member of the Legislative Assembly. Her supporters started petitions to keep her as premier, with one receiving nearly 40,000 signatures in 48 hours and eventually totalling more than 70,000 names. Berejiklian stayed on as Premier until her treasurer Dominic Perrottet was elected as party leader and Premier at a party room meeting on 5 October 2021. She later announced she would be "spending her last days in office addressing local concerns" before officially resigning as member of the Legislative Assembly on 30 December 2021. A by-election for Berejiklian's seat of Willoughby was held on 12 February 2022, where Liberal Member Tim James secured the seat.

In December 2021, after speculation that she might contest in the 2022 federal election, Berejiklian confirmed that she would instead work in the private sector and looked forward to "a much less public life".

=== ICAC report and finding of corrupt behaviour ===
Findings from the ICAC case were subsequently delayed and thus not released before the 2023 state election.

On 29 June 2023, the ICAC found that Berejiklian had engaged in "serious corrupt conduct". The ICAC did not recommend that criminal charges be pursued due to the difficulties in mounting a prosecution and the unlikelihood that the Director of Public Prosecutions would follow such a recommendation.

In September 2023, Berejiklian lodged legal action against ICAC, seeking judicial review of their findings against her. Mark Forbes, director of Icon Reputation, said to Guardian Australia that he believed Berejiklian's legal challenge was likely an attempt to "redress reputational baggage" for potential future business or political opportunities. In July 2024, the Court of Appeal rejected Berejiklian's challenge and upheld ICAC's original ruling that her behaviour was corrupt.

==== Reactions ====
===== Coalition =====
The report's delayed release, along with Maguire's actions and the report's findings, were criticised by some members of the New South Wales Liberal Party, who gave their support to Berejiklian, including Opposition Leader Mark Speakman, who held a press conference on the matter.

Other state Liberals who criticised the report and spoke in support of Berejiklian included James Griffin, Pru Goward, Tim James, Matt Kean, Philip Ruddock and Natalie Ward.

Federal Opposition Leader Peter Dutton defended Gladys Berejiklian, saying she was "not corrupt" but was engaged in a bad relationship.

Berejiklian's proposed lawsuit against ICAC was backed by federal Nationals leader David Littleproud and Kean.

It has been reported that the New South Wales Liberal Party will not expel Berejiklian.

===== Labor Party =====
Premier Chris Minns commented on the report's findings but defended Berejiklian's response to the COVID-19 pandemic, which he said was "excellent". Prime Minister Anthony Albanese refused to comment on the issue.

===== Others =====
The Greens were supportive of the ICAC investigation, saying it should bring integrity to the New South Wales Parliament. These remarks were made by both federal and state Greens MPs, including federal Senator Mehreen Faruqi, NSW state MP David Shoebridge, and Victorian state MP Tim Read, with Read also stating that Berejiklian would have not been found corrupt if investigated by Victoria's equivalent to ICAC, the Independent Broad-based Anti-corruption Commission (IBAC).

== Post-political career (2022–present) ==
In February 2022, Berejiklian was appointed to the executive board of telecommunications company Optus, in the newly created role of Managing Director, Enterprise, Business and Institutional.

In May 2026, Berejiklian assumed a role on the board of the Victor Chang Cardiac Research Institute.

== Political positions ==
Berejiklian was a member of the moderate faction of the Liberal Party and also supports the Australian republican movement.

== Personal life ==
Berejiklian regularly attends events of the Armenian Apostolic Church. Since June 2021, she has been dating lawyer Arthur Moses who represented her at a corruption hearing into her former boyfriend Daryl Maguire.

Berejiklian is a supporter of NRL club the Manly Warringah Sea Eagles.

== Popular culture ==
In September 2018, Sydney electronic music duo Twisted Melodiez in collaboration with Melbourne-based N3bula released a song named "Shut this Down", which remixed comments made by Berejikian in a press conference that year in which she vowed to ban future iterations of Defqon.1 in New South Wales as a result of a number of drug-related deaths at the festival, as well as categorically ruling out implementing pill testing in New South Wales.

A musical Gladys: A Musical Affair, written by Nick Rheinberger and starring Tia Wilson as "Ms Perfect", had a successful premiere at the 2025 Sydney Fringe and was scheduled for a series of shows at the civic theatre in Wagga Wagga in the following June.

== See also ==
- List of female heads of government in Australia
- Corruption in Australia

New South Wales Legislative Assembly
Preceded by Peter Collins	Member for Willoughby; 2003–2021	Succeeded by Tim James
Political offices
Preceded by John Robertson	Minister for Transport; 2011–2015	Succeeded by Andrew Constance as Minister for Transport and Infrastructure
Preceded by Mike Gallacher	Minister for the Hunter; 2014–2015	Portfolio abolished
Preceded by Andrew Constance	Treasurer of New South Wales; 2015–2017	Succeeded by Dominic Perrottet
Preceded by Andrew Constance	Minister for Industrial Relations; 2015–2017	Succeeded by Dominic Perrottet
Preceded by Mike Baird	Premier of New South Wales; 2017–2021	Succeeded by Dominic Perrottet
Party political offices
Preceded by Jillian Skinner	Deputy Leader of the New South Wales Liberal Party; 2014–2017	Succeeded by Dominic Perrottet
Preceded by Mike Baird	Leader of the New South Wales Liberal Party; 2017–2021	Succeeded by Dominic Perrottet
