= Peter Collins (New South Wales politician) =

Australian politician

Captain The Honourable Peter Collins AM, RFD, KC, RANR

Leader of the Opposition of New South Wales
- In office 4 April 1995 – 8 December 1998
- Premier: Bob Carr
- Deputy: Ron Phillips
- Preceded by: Bob Carr
- Succeeded by: Kerry Chikarovski

Member of the New South Wales Parliament for Willoughby
- In office 25 May 1991 – 21 March 2003
- Preceded by: New district
- Succeeded by: Gladys Berejiklian
- In office 19 September 1981 – 22 February 1988
- Preceded by: Eddie Britt
- Succeeded by: District abolished

Member of the New South Wales Parliament for Middle Harbour
- In office 22 February 1988 – 25 May 1991
- Preceded by: District created
- Succeeded by: District abolished

Personal details
- Born: 10 May 1947 (age 79) Lismore, New South Wales, Australia
- Party: Liberal Party

Military service
- Allegiance: Australia
- Branch/service: (Australia) Australian Army Reserve; Royal Australian Naval Reserve
- Years of service: 1964 – 2012
- Rank: Lieutenant (Army); Captain (Navy)
- Unit: Sydney University Regiment; 1st Commando Regiment; Australian Naval Intelligence; Royal Australian Naval Reserve
- Commands: Director Naval Reserve Support
- Battles/wars: Iraq War
- Awards: Member of the Order of Australia; Commander of the Order of St John; Reserve Force Decoration

Captain Peter Edward James Collins, AM, RFD, KC, RANR (born 10 May 1947) is a former Australian politician who served as the Leader of the Opposition in the New South Wales Legislative Assembly from 4 April 1995 to 8 December 1998. He was a member of the Liberal party.

== Early years ==
Peter Collins was born the eldest son of Ronald and Mavis Collins. He was educated at Marist College Kogarah, Saint Patrick's, Bathurst and Waverley College from 1960 to 1964. From 1965 to 1972 Collins was a student at the University of Sydney, graduating with a Bachelor of Arts and a Bachelor of Laws and residing at St John's College. After university, Collins went on to be a journalist and researcher for Four Corners and Monday Conference on ABC TV and was a media consultant for several major companies.

== Army and Navy Reserve ==
During his university years from 1965 to 1972, Collins joined the Army Reserve gaining the rank of Lieutenant. In 1969 Collins qualified as a parachutist in the 1st Commando Company. In 1988, after being promoted to lieutenant in the Naval Reserve, he was promoted to Lieutenant-Commander, and then to Commander in 1994. Collins retired from the Navy in 2012 in the senior rank of captain.

== Political career ==
Collins was elected to the seat of Willoughby in the New South Wales Legislative Assembly in 1981 as a Liberal. This traditional blue-ribbon Liberal seat had been swept up in the "Wranslide" of 1978, with Labor's Eddie Britt becoming the first Labor member to win it since 1915. However, a redistribution erased Britt's already paper-thin majority and made Willoughby notionally Liberal. At the election, Collins narrowly defeated Britt, and actually came within a few hundred votes of winning on the first count. However, he easily dispatched Britt in a 1984 rematch, picking up a swing large enough to revert Willoughby to its traditional status as a comfortably safe Liberal seat. He held Willoughby until his retirement (though it was called Middle Harbour from 1988 to 1991).

Collins served in opposition until the election of Nick Greiner as Premier in 1988. He was also deputy Liberal leader under Greiner. Collins served as Health Minister, Treasurer, and other portfolios throughout the Liberal Government until its defeat by Labor under Bob Carr in 1995. Collins was immediately elected opposition leader on 4 April 1995, but he was deposed by Kerry Chikarovski on 8 December 1998 without having faced an election. Collins remained in Parliament until the 2003 state election, which he did not contest.

Parliamentary summary

- Member for Willoughby (1981–2003);
- Shadow Special Minister of State (2002);
- Shadow Minister for the Arts (2002);
- Member, Standing Committee on Public Works (2002–03);
- Leader of the Opposition (1995–98);
- Treasurer of New South Wales (1993–95);
- Minister for the Arts (1988–1995);
- Minister for State Development (1992–93);
- Attorney General (1991–92);
- Minister for Consumer Affairs (1991–92);
- Minister for Health (1988–1991);
- Deputy Leader of the Parliamentary Liberal Party (1986–1992);
- Shadow Special Minister of State (2002);
- Shadow Minister for the Arts (1981–88, 1995–98, 2002);
- Shadow Minister for Health (1986–88);
- Shadow Minister for Industrial Relations and Employment (1984–86);
- Shadow Minister for Planning and Environment (1983–84);
- Shadow Minister for Consumer Affairs (1981–83).

Collins had ambitions for federal politics and an opportunity presented itself when Liberal MP Michael Mackellar retired from his seat of Warringah which encompassed Collins's state seat of Willoughby. Collins, despite expressing interest, chose not to seek Liberal preselection for the ensuing by-election due to the state Coalition holding office as a minority government. If Collins had become the preselected candidate it would have required him to resign from state parliament in order to contest this federal by-election and placed in question the stability of the minority Coalition government. The Warringah preselection and by-election was instead won by future prime minister Tony Abbott.

== Later career ==
After his time in politics, the Australian Government appointed Collins Chair of the Australian Institute of Health and Welfare (2004–11); the NSW Government appointed him to the Cancer Council of NSW (2004–06), then Chair of the Cancer Institute of NSW (2005–08); and, he has been Chairman of St. John Ambulance NSW (2007–current). He is Chairman of the Advisory Board for National Patient Transport (NPT) Pty Ltd and a Member of the St Vincents & Mater Health Sydney Advisory Council. Collins is also the founder and national chairman of Barton Deakin, a government relations firm that provides strategic advice to business and not-for-profits on working with Liberal and Coalition governments.

In 2009, he was appointed Chair of Legal Aid NSW on the recommendation of the Attorney General; and, in 2010, was appointed Deputy Chair of the Centenary of ANZAC Commemoration Committee for NSW. From 2006–09 he was a board member of Macquarie Generation, an energy company.

He has been a director of the industry superannuation fund Hostplus since 2006; and a board member of the Workers Compensation Insurance Fund Investment Board of NSW (2005–12). He is a Fellow of the Australian Institute of Superannuation Trustees (FAIST) and chairman of the Sydney Financial Forum. Maintaining a long association with the University of Sydney, he was made an Associate of the Graduate School of Government (2004–08). Collins is also Chairman of Barton Deakin Government Relations, which he established in 2009.

With an active, lifelong interest in the ADF, he has served as both an Army and Navy Reserve officer — during a 37-year RAN career he was Honorary Colonel of the elite 1st Commando Regiment (1995–2000) and saw active service in Iraq as a legal officer in 2007. He left the Navy in 2012 in the senior rank of captain. He was awarded the US Joint Service Commendation Medal for his service in Iraq. The Australian Government appointed him to the Defence White Paper Consultative Committee in 2008.

For his civilian service, Collins was made a Member of the Order of Australia (2004); was made a Commander in the Order of St John (2012); and received the Centenary Medal.

In December 2024, he was appointed to the Art Gallery of NSW Board of Trustees.

On 20 March 2026, Collins was elected President of the New South Wales Division of the Liberal Party of Australia.

== Personal life ==
Collins has married three times. In 1973, he married Jennifer Ruth White, with whom he has two sons. In 1983, he married Dominique Fisher with whom he also has two sons. Both these marriages ended in divorce. Since 2002 Collins has been married to Jennine Leonarder. Collins' interests include: military and naval history, contemporary dance, visual arts, film and literature.

== Honours and awards ==
Member of the Order of Australia (AM)	2004
Commander of the Order of St John	2012
Australian Active Service Medal	
Iraq Medal	
Centenary Medal	2001
Reserve Force Decoration (RFD)	with two rosettes
Australian Defence Medal	
Joint Commendation Medal	(United States)

New South Wales Legislative Assembly
Preceded by Eddie Britt	Member for Willoughby; 1981 – 1988	District abolished
New district	Member for Middle Harbour; 1988 – 1991	District abolished
New district	Member for Willoughby; 1991 – 2003	Succeeded by Gladys Berejiklian
Party political offices
Preceded by Rosemary Foot	Deputy Leader of the New South Wales Liberal Party; 1986 – 1992	Succeeded by Bruce Baird
Preceded by John Fahey	Leader of the New South Wales Liberal Party; 1995 – 1998	Succeeded by Kerry Chikarovski
Political offices
Preceded by Frank Walker	Minister for the Arts; 1988 – 1995	Succeeded by Bob Carr
Preceded by Peter Anderson	Minister for Health; 1988 – 1991	Succeeded by John Hannaford
Preceded by John Dowd	Attorney General of New South Wales; 1991 – 1992	Succeeded by John Hannaford
Preceded by John Fahey	Treasurer of New South Wales; 1993 – 1995	Succeeded by Michael Egan
Preceded by Bob Carr	Leader of the Opposition of New South Wales; 1995 – 1998	Succeeded by Kerry Chikarovski
