= George Brain =

Australian politician

Member of the New South Wales Parliament for Willoughby
- In office 1943 – 1968

Personal details
- Born: George William Brain; 18 January 1893 Picton, Colony of New South Wales
- Died: 18 January 1969 (aged 76) Willoughby, New South Wales, Australia

George William Brain was an Australian politician and member of the New South Wales Legislative Assembly. He was the longest-serving member for Willoughby, serving from 1943 until his retirement in 1968. Brain was recognised as one of the primary forces in establishing the Free library movement in New South Wales.

== Early years ==
Brain was born 18 January 1893 in Picton the eldest of nine children. He attended schools at Picton and Parramatta and left school at 13 years of age to work in Scone dairying. Two years earlier, he had begun delivering newspapers for 3 shillings a week but was docked one penny for each paper said not to have been delivered even though they were frequently stolen by passers-by. At about 20 years of age, he moved to Sydney to look for work and delivered milk at Mascot until all his possessions were stolen forcing him to return home to his parents at Mudgee. These early hardships were critical in forming the substance of the man and Brain was left with a resolute determination to educate himself and a realisation of the importance of access to education to all people regardless of their wealth and status. Such experience motivated his subsequent passion for the Free library movement and its importance in society.

Brain studied book-keeping of an evening by the light of a slush light after working 16 hours straight during the day. As a result of his studies, he obtained a job with the Western Post at Mudgee. On moving to the Sydney suburb of Willoughby in 1920 after his marriage to Paula Merkle in 1918, he passed his accountancy examinations and formed the partnership of Brain and Noble chartered accountants. From 1918, he took an active interest in the Progress Association, P&C association and political parties and thus began his political career.

In the 1930s, Brain together with George Morris of Eastern Valley Way, Willoughby promoted the "free milk movement for school children", a scheme which relieved parents financially during the depression and ensured the health of generations of children.

In 1941, Brain was the president of the "Monster War Carnival" held at Willoughby park. The carnival which was opened by the Rt Hon Billy Hughes raised in excess of £1,000 sufficient at this time to buy two ambulances for the war effort.

== Political life ==
Before entering the NSW Parliament, Brain was elected in 1941 as an Alderman for the Middle Harbour ward, Municipality of Willoughby where he served with distinction until his entry into NSW Parliament in September 1943.

On the death of the former member, Edward Sanders, Brain won the by election held in September 1943 and all subsequent elections including that held on 1 May 1965. Prior to his retirement in January 1968, he fought nine elections and on each occasion was returned with a larger majority, possibly a record in NSW parliament and certainly a testimony to his dedication and to the faith in which he was held by the voters of Willoughby.

Brain's maiden speech in the NSW parliament implored the parliament to act on the recommendations of the Munn-Pitt report which was scathing in its assessment on the current state of libraries in this country. He had on his own initiative already convened a meeting of like-minded individuals in the Willoughby electorate and thus the Free library movement of NSW was formed in Willoughby. A subsequent committee was formed with Brain as the Secretary culminating in the drafting of a bill for submission and acceptance by the NSW parliament.

Premier Robert Askin said "memories of his struggle for a higher education—and it was a struggle, as will be appreciated by all those who knew something of his early life—remained with George all his life. They prompted him to work vigorously for the establishment of free libraries. He was dedicated to his work. He regarded free libraries as one of the best means of adult self-education." Brain considered the achievement of the free library scheme as "one of the State's greatest social triumphs".

Brain was the New South Wales delegate to the Commonwealth Parliamentary Association Congress held in Bombay, India (now Mumbai) in 1957 under the leadership of Sir William McMahon.

He had a dry sense of humour. When asked why the three-way partnership of Brain, Noble and Campbell was so successful, his reply was "Our wives have never met". On another occasion, he said "figures do not lie, but liars can figure".

== Sporting life ==
Brain was a keen sportsman and later in his life bowls became a passion. As expected from a servant of the people, even in relaxation he could not resist contributing selflessly. His many achievements included being a founder and patron of Willoughby Park bowling club, patron of Valley View bowling club, member of the State parliamentary bowling club of which he was president in 1967–68.

== Tribute to a servant of Willoughby ==
Brain died in his sleep on his 76th birthday in Willoughby. His funeral was held on 21 January 1969 and to that date was the largest that had occurred in the municipality of Willoughby. One month later, Premier Askin, leader of the opposition, Pat Hills and others paid tribute to this outstanding servant of the people of Willoughby.

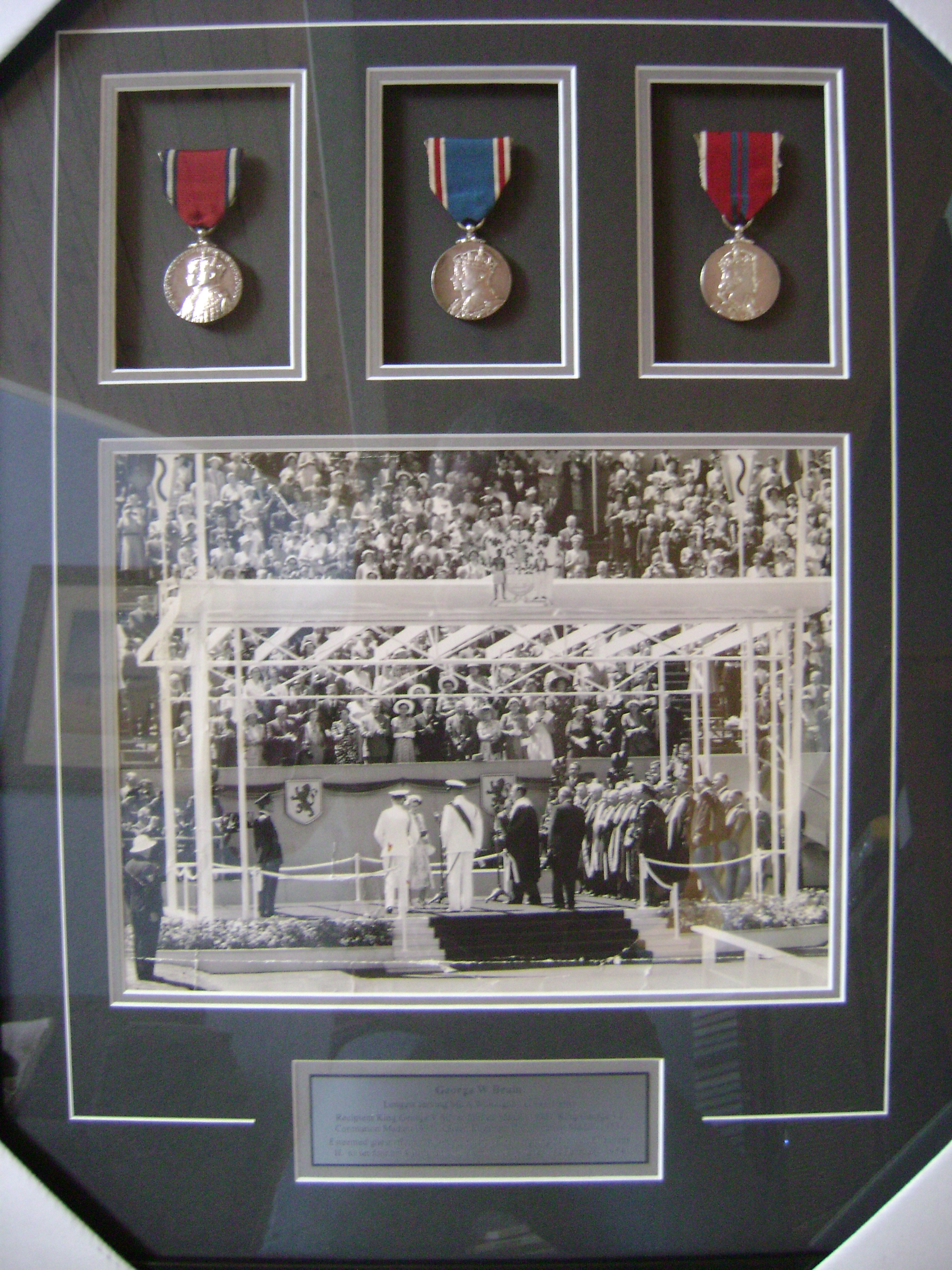
A framed collection of the medals received by George W Brain in recognition of his service to the NSW Government

During his lifetime, he was the recipient of the King George V Silver Jubilee Medal, the King George VI Coronation Medal and the Queen Elizabeth II Coronation Medal.

Gladys Berejiklian, a subsequent Member of State Parliament for Willoughby (2003-2021) and NSW Premier (2017-2021), honoured George W Brain in her maiden (now inaugural) speech making reference to George's contribution to The Free library movement in NSW and his commitment to ensuring the right to education for rich and poor alike. In this speech. Gladys pledged her own commitment to ensuring that a fitting tribute to George be established in the electorate of Willoughby.

Willoughby Council honoured Brain in 2008 by naming a lane after him. Given Brain's pivotal role as the 'backbone' of the Free Library Movement, it has been stated that "This is more than a lane - it is a veritable avenue for future research by some of the brains of the library history world.

A display of permanent pertinent memorabilia and historical items associated with Brain's political career and the Free Library Movement in which the above medals are displayed (loaned to Chatswood library by the Brain family) was unveiled on 24 November 2011. George Brain's grandson Philip H Brain spoke at this event, detailing George's life and highlighting his role in the Free Library Movement. It is hoped that other items owned by George currently on display at Mudgee Historical Museum will ultimately be added to the Chatswood library collection.

In 1977, a letter from the then Chief Librarian of Willoughby library, John Flint to George Brain's son Paul Brain, detailed that the Council of that day had resolved that some form of substantial permanent recognition of George Brain's role in the Free Library Movement would be made in the new library (of that day). Unfortunately, the significant contribution made by Brain to the municipality of Willoughby has not been recognised by naming a room within the new Chatswood library after him as promised. However, it is hoped that one day the commitment made in 1977 may yet still be honoured and it would be most appropriate if the magnificent "George Brain collection" was ultimately held within a room named after him.

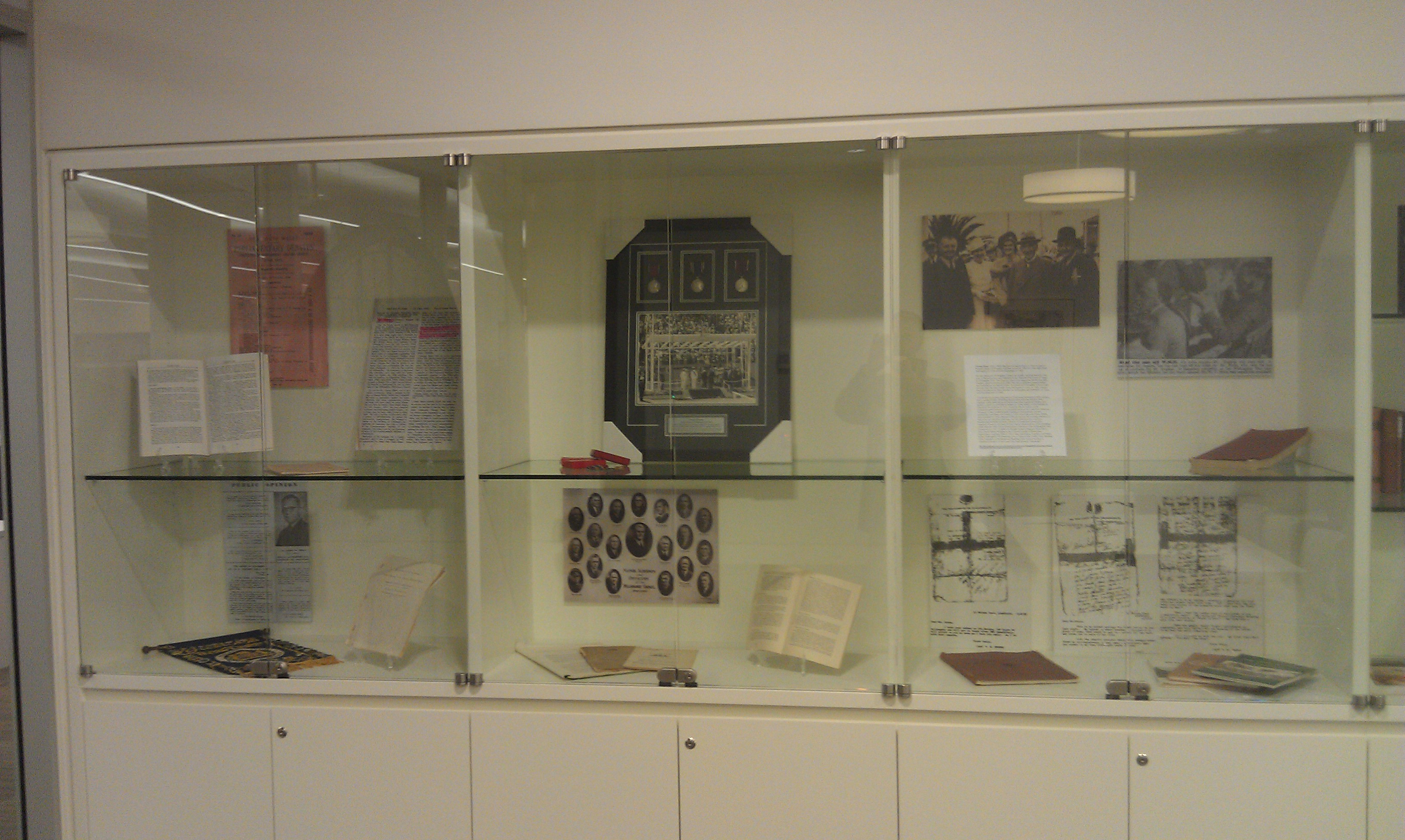
The George W Brain collection is proudly displayed at the magnificent new Chatswood library opened in October 2011

New South Wales Legislative Assembly
Preceded by Edward Sanders	Member for Willoughby; 1943–1968	Succeeded by Laurie McGinty
