= Eddie Britt (politician) =

Australian politician

Edwin Alfred Britt (11 November 1926 – 6 December 2013) was an Australian politician. He was the Labor member for Willoughby in the New South Wales Legislative Assembly from 1978 to 1981.

Britt was born in Narrandera. In 1942 he moved from Narrandera to Sydney and worked in the state public service in technical education. He enlisted as ground staff in the RAAF in 1944. In 1950 he was transferred to the Lotteries Office, and settled in Willoughby. In 1956 he joined the Labor Party, in which he was active for the rest of his life. He was elected to Willoughby Council in 1965, serving until 1968 and again from 1975 to 1995. He married Mary Hayes on 14 August 1976.

He unsuccessfully contested the state seat of Willoughby for Labor in 1976. In 1978, sitting Liberal member Laurie McGinty lost preselection to future Premier Nick Greiner and contested the seat as an independent. The split in the conservative vote allowed Britt to win narrowly in this normally comfortably safe Liberal seat. However, a redistribution ahead of the 1981 state election erased Britt's majority and made Willoughby notionally Liberal. Despite this, Britt nominated for another term, and was narrowly defeated by Liberal challenger Peter Collins. He tried to regain the seat in 1984, and was heavily defeated, taking only 34 percent of the two-party vote.

New South Wales Legislative Assembly
Preceded by Laurie McGinty	Member for Willoughby; 1978–1981	Succeeded by Peter Collins
