= Tim James (Australian politician) =

Australian politician (born 1975)

Tim James MP
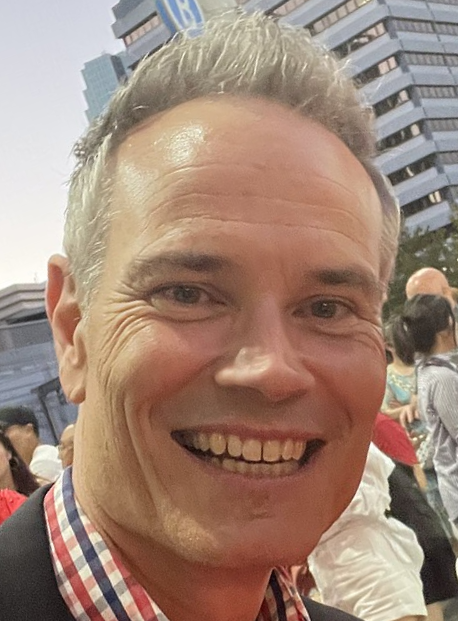
- James in 2023

Member of the New South Wales Parliament for Willoughby
- Incumbent
- Assumed office 12 February 2022
- Preceded by: Gladys Berejiklian

Personal details
- Born: Timothy Charles James; 2 September 1975 (age 51) Artarmon, New South Wales, Australia
- Party: Liberal
- Spouse: Nikki James (m. 2014)
- Children: 3
- Education: University of Technology Sydney

Timothy Charles James (born 2 September 1975) is an Australian politician who has been the member of the New South Wales Legislative Assembly (MP) for the electorate of Willoughby since 2022.

Prior to entering politics, James worked as a solicitor and as a legal adviser for numerous companies, and was the Executive General Manager at the Menzies Research Centre, the think tank of the Liberal Party.

== Early life and career ==
Timothy Charles James was born on 2 September 1975 in Artarmon on Sydney's Lower North Shore where he was raised. He joined the Liberal Party in 1993, and from 1996, worked in the offices of Joe Hockey and John Howard while completing his business and law studies at the University of Technology Sydney. James graduated with a Bachelor of Business in 1998, and again, with a Bachelor of Laws in 2001.

Admitted as a solicitor to the Supreme Court of New South Wales in 2002, James worked as a commercial lawyer for Allens Arthur Robinson and then as a legal adviser to Pfizer Australia, he has also worked at KPMG and Johnson & Johnson. While undertaking secondments in New York and London, James completed a Master of Business Administration at the Australian Graduate School of Management.

James worked as chief of staff to Anthony Roberts, New South Wales Minister for Fair Trading from 2011 to 2013, and then as Minister for Industry, Resources and Energy, and Special Minister of State. From 2014 to 2015, he was the CEO of Medicines Australia.

In 2017, he contested Liberal Party preselection for the 2017 North Shore by-election, losing to moderate Felicity Wilson. In 2018, James again unsuccessfully challenged Felicity Wilson for preselection for the seat of North Shore. He challenged the result in the NSW Supreme Court. James lost his legal challenge, with the court ruling against him.

Following the resignation of Gladys Berejiklian, James was endorsed as the Liberal Party candidate for the Willoughby by-election in January 2022, defeating former local mayor Gail Giles-Gidney and Kellie Sloane for preselection. He won the election in February 2022, defeating independent Larissa Penn.

He was previously the executive general manager of the Menzies Research Centre, a think tank associated with the Liberal Party.

== Political career ==
In October 2022, he delivered a speech in the New South Wales Parliament stating his opposition to the government's planned infrastructure program's of the Western Harbour Tunnel, the Warringah Freeway Upgrade and the Beaches Link Tunnel. The Beaches Link program was not funded in the 2022 NSW budget. In September 2023, the Beaches Link was cancelled by the Minns Labor government.

James was re-elected to his seat of Willoughby at the 2023 election, again defeating Larissa Penn, with a swing from him of 13.4 points.

=== Shadow ministry ===
After its defeat at 2023 election, the Liberal–National Coalition entered opposition under the leadership of Mark Speakman. Following this, he was appointed by Speakman as the Shadow Minister for Fair Trading, Work Health and Safety and Building.

In July 2024, James was appointed as the Shadow Minister for Small Business, leaving the portfolio after the January 2026 shadow cabinet reshuffle.

In January 2026, following the election of Kellie Sloane as the leader of the New South Wales Liberal Party, James was appointed to the Sloane shadow ministry to the portfolios of Shadow Minister for Local Government and Shadow Minister for Veterans, while also retaining his previous shadow portfolios.

James is a member of the National Right faction of the Liberal Party.

New South Wales Legislative Assembly
Preceded by Gladys Berejiklian	Member for Willoughby; 2022–present	Incumbent
