= Edward Larkin =

Australian politician & Australia international rugby union player (1880–1915)

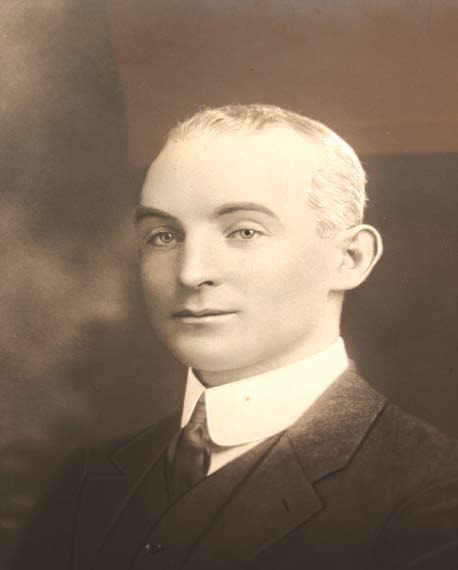
- MLA ER Larkin 1913
- Born: Edward Rennix Larkin; 3 January 1880 North Lambton, New South Wales
- Died: 25 April 1915 (aged 35) Anzac Cove, Gallipoli, Ottoman Turkey
- School: St. Joseph's College, Hunters Hill

Rugby union career
- Position: Hooker
Senior career
Years	Team	Apps	(Points)
1897–1903	Endeavour Rugby Club		
Provincial / State sides
Years	Team	Apps	(Points)
1903	New South Wales	2	
International career
Years	Team	Apps	(Points)
1903	Australia	1	(0)
- Military career
- Allegiance: Australia
- Branch: Australian Imperial Force
- Service years: 1914–1915
- Rank: Sergeant
- Unit: 1st Battalion
- Conflicts: First World War; Gallipoli campaign; Landing at Anzac Cove (DOW)

Edward Rennix Larkin (3 January 1880 – 25 April 1915) was an Australian parliamentarian and a national representative rugby union player. Larkin was the member for Willoughby in the New South Wales Legislative Assembly from December 1913 until his death. He served in the Australian Imperial Force in the First World War, and was killed in action on the first day of the Gallipoli campaign. He was one of only two serving members of any Australian parliament to die in the First World War — the other was George Braund, also a New South Wales MLA who was killed at Gallipoli.

== Early life ==
Larkin was born at North Lambton, New South Wales, to William Joseph Larkin, a quarryman and his wife Mary Ann, née Rennix. His family moved to Camperdown in Sydney where the young Ted Larkin was schooled at St Benedict's Broadway, run by the Marist Brothers. For his last two years of senior schooling he boarded at St. Joseph's College, Hunters Hill, where he played in the college's 1896 first rugby XV.

After school Larkin worked in journalism before joining the Metropolitan Police Force in 1903 as a foot-constable, later being promoted to first-constable in 1905. His premature greying made him appear older than he was.

== Rugby union career ==
Larkin maintained an active involvement in sports after completing his schooling and participated in cricket, swimming and rugby union and played first grade with the Endeavour Rugby Club at Newtown in Sydney. In 1903 he was captain of that club and made his state representative debut for New South Wales against Queensland and then the touring New Zealand national rugby team before being selected for Australia in the first Test of 1903 in Sydney in the August, against those same All Blacks. Larkin played at hooker for the Australian representative side in a pack featuring future rugby league pioneers and dual-code rugby internationals Alex Burdon, Denis Lutge and Bill Hardcastle. The Australians were soundly beaten 22–3 by the All Blacks.

== Rugby league administrator ==
Larkin knew and sympathised with a number of the senior rugby union players who in 1906–07 became louder in their discontent with the administration of the New South Wales Rugby Union over rejection of compensation claims for injuries and lost wages. The breakaway in Australia took place in 1908, as it had earlier in 1895 with the Northern Union in Northern England. A gifted public speaker, Larkin had continued to develop a strong sense of social justice during his years in the police force. After the financial failure of the 1908–09 Kangaroo tour of Great Britain and claims of mismanagement by the league's founding fathers James Joseph Giltinan, cricketer Victor Trumper and Labor politician Henry Hoyle, the pioneer code looked to be in jeopardy before it had barely begun.

In June 1909, Larkin left the police force and was appointed the first full-time secretary of the almost bankrupt New South Wales Rugby League. He was an excellent organizer and had success in promoting the new game evidenced by the crowd of 42,000 who filled the Agricultural Oval in June 1910 to see the Australia v Great Britain Test. During his administration which lasted till 1913, he convinced the Catholic education hierarchy and the Marist Brothers in particular, to adopt rugby league as their winter sporting game. To this day, the code benefits from this legacy in New South Wales and Queensland.

== Parliamentary career ==
In December 1913 Larkin stood as the Labor Party candidate for the conservative seat of Willoughby in Sydney winning 51.61% of the vote in a second ballot. He was living at Milsons Point at the time and became the first Labor Member of Parliament elected from the north side of Sydney Harbour. He was appointed as the government representative on the board of the Royal North Shore Hospital and was vocal in his support for proposal to build a bridge across Sydney Harbour Larkin was the member for Willoughby in the New South Wales Legislative Assembly from December 1913 until his death.

== Active service and death ==
Larkin's career was cut short with the outbreak of the First World War on 4 August 1914. Larkin enlisted within ten days of war's declaration and joined C Coy of the 1st Battalion, of the Australian Imperial Force's 1st Division. In his final address to the NSW Parliament, on 18 August 1914, Larkin said, "I cannot engage in the work of recruiting and urge others to enlist unless I do so myself." Gray quotes a brief poem published in the Sydney Sun in 1918 acclaiming Larkin for his virtue in enlisting.

The battalion left Australia in October 1914, arriving in Egypt on 2 December. Larkin's brother Martin also embarked on the transport A19 Afric for Egypt where Ted, a sergeant, was active in promoting games of rugby league amongst the troops.

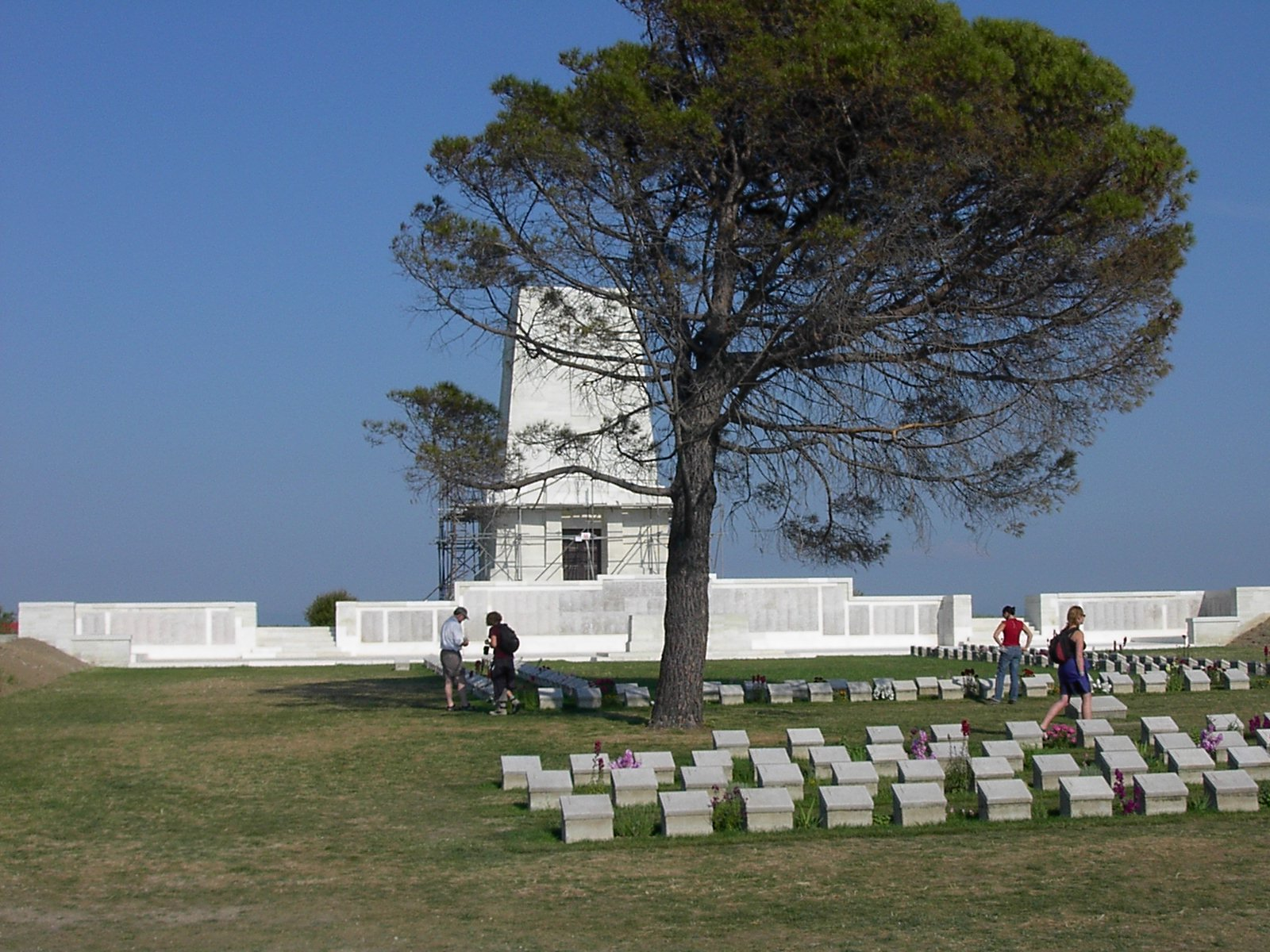
Lone Pine cemetery

The battalion landed at Anzac Cove at dawn on 25 April 1915 as part of the second and third waves, starting the Gallipoli campaign. It took part in the desperate struggle for the dominating hill known as Baby 700. The Turks wrested control of the hill and counter-attacked to drive the Australians from the high ground. That afternoon Ted Larkin died from a chest wound in a hail of machine gun fire.

Heads and Middleton quote from the war memoir Imperishable Anzacs by Harold Cavill: "Wounded and dying he lay, yet when the stretcher-bearers came to carry him in, he waved them on, saying 'There's plenty worse than me out there'. Later they found him dead". His brother Martin aged 38 also lost his life that day on the heights above Anzac Cove. Neither body was recovered until the burial Armistice of 24 May but there is no known grave for either of the Larkin brothers and their names are recorded on the Lone Pine Memorial commemorating 4,934 Australian and New Zealand troops killed in the sector who have no known grave.

== In memoriam ==
Confirmation of Larkin's death did not reach Australia until June, whereupon a requiem mass was celebrated at St Mary's Cathedral, Sydney attended by many distinguished citizens including the Premier and the Governor of New South Wales. Ted and Martin were both posthumously awarded the 1914–15 Star, the British War Medal and the Victory Medal.

The 1915 Sydney rugby league City Cup Grand Final was held as a testimonial for Ted Larkin's widow and sons and raised £171. The St Joseph's College Old Boys' Union set up the Sergeant Larkin Bursary to help finance his sons fees at the college (at a meeting on 1 July 1915, the following resolution was passed: "That in order to commemorate the signal service of the late Sergeant E.R. Larkin, M.L.A., to Australia, the Union invite the co-operation of the all old boys to provide a bursary at St. Joseph's College for the deceased member's son"). The family eventually declined the offer but the bursary has survived to this day as the Old Boys' Bursary.

On 30 November 1915, in the New South Wales Legislative Assembly, the Speaker unveiled a commemorative tablet in honour of Lieutenant-Colonel George Braund, Member for Armidale and Sergeant Edward Rennix Larkin, Member for Willoughby who both fell at Gallipoli. The plaque reads:

In time of Peace they readily asserted the rights of citizenship. In time of War they fiercely protected them.

== See also ==
- List of Australian military personnel killed at Anzac Cove on 25 April 1915
- List of international rugby union players killed in action during the First World War

== Footnotes ==
New South Wales Legislative Assembly
Preceded by Charles Wade	Member for Willoughby; 1913–1915	Succeeded by John Haynes
