= Electoral district of Willoughby =

Australian state-level electoral district

Willoughby New South Wales—Legislative Assembly
- Interactive map of district boundaries from the 2023 state election
- State: New South Wales
- Dates current: 1894–1920; 1927–1988; 1991–present
- MP: Tim James
- Party: Liberal
- Namesake: Willoughby
- Electors: 60,285 (2023)
- Area: 23.56 km^{2} (9.1 sq mi)
- Demographic: Inner-metropolitan
Electorates around Willoughby:
| Davidson | Davidson | Wakehurst |
| Lane Cove | Willoughby | Manly |
| Lane Cove | North Shore | North Shore |

Willoughby is an electoral district of the Legislative Assembly in the Australian state of New South Wales. It has been represented by Tim James of the Liberal Party since 12 February 2022.

== History ==
Willoughby was an electoral district of the New South Wales Legislative Assembly, first created in 1894 with the abolition of multi-member electoral districts from part of St Leonards, and named after and including the Sydney suburb of Willoughby. It was abolished in 1904 and re-established in 1913. In 1920 with the introduction of proportional representation, it was absorbed into the multi-member electorate of Ryde along with Burwood and Gordon. It was recreated in 1927 with the return to single-member electorates. It was abolished in 1988, with most of its territory becoming Middle Harbour. In 1991, Middle Harbour was abolished and replaced by a recreated Willoughby.

Like most seats in the North Shore, Willoughby is a stronghold for the Liberal Party. Counting its time as Middle Harbour, the Liberals or their predecessors have held the seat for all but two terms since the return to single-member seats in 1927. The one break in this tradition came in the "Wranslide" of 1978, when a split in the Liberal vote allowed Labor's Eddie Britt to sweep into office. However, a redistribution ahead of the 1981 election erased Britt's majority and made Willoughby notionally Liberal. Britt narrowly lost to future state opposition leader Peter Collins even in the face of the second "Wranslide."

The seat reverted to form in 1984, with Collins easily seeing off Britt in a rematch. Since then, Labor has usually run dead in Willoughby, and on some occasions has been pushed into third place. The only time the Liberal hold on the seat has been seriously threatened since the 1980s came on Collins' retirement in 2003. Pat Reilly, the longtime mayor of the City of Willoughby, ran as an independent and nearly defeated Liberal Gladys Berejiklian on Labor preferences. The swing against the Liberals was large enough to drop the Liberal margin over Labor to 7.2 percent, the closest in two decades. However, Berejiklian easily despatched Reilly in a rematch and held the seat without serious difficulty until her retirement in 2022.

Willoughby is one of four electorates in the New South Wales Legislative Assembly to have been held by two Premiers of New South Wales while in office. Both Premiers (Sir) Charles Wade and Gladys Berejiklian held Willoughby while in office, the other three electorates being Ku-ring-gai, Maroubra and Wollondilly.

Berejiklian has facts in common with her predecessor in Willoughby, Collins in that both had served as state Liberal leaders and prior to that served as Deputy Liberal leader and Treasurer although unlike Collins, Berejiklian held the positions of Deputy Liberal leader and Treasurer simultaneously.

== Geography ==
On its current boundaries, Willoughby takes in the suburbs of Cammeray, Castle Cove, Castlecrag, Chatswood, Chatswood West, Cremorne, Middle Cove, Northbridge, North Willoughby, Willoughby, Willoughby East and parts of Artarmon, Crows Nest, Lane Cove North and St Leonards.

== Members for Willoughby ==
First incarnation (1894–1904)
| Member | Party | Term |
|---|---|---|
| Joseph Cullen | Free Trade | 1894–1894 |
| Edward Clark | Free Trade | 1894–1895 |
| George Howarth | Free Trade | 1895–1901 |
| George Howarth | Liberal Reform | 1901–1903 |
| Charles Wade | Liberal Reform | 1903–1904 |
Second incarnation (1913–1920)
| Member | Party | Term |
| Edward Larkin | Labor | 1913–1915 |
| John Haynes | Independent Democrat | 1915–1917 |
| Reginald Weaver | Nationalist | 1917–1920 |
Third incarnation (1927–1988)
| Member | Party | Term |
| Edward Sanders | Independent Nationalist | 1927–1930 |
| Edward Sanders | Nationalist | 1930–1932 |
| Edward Sanders | United Australia | 1932–1943 |
| George Brain | United Australia | 1943–1943 |
| George Brain | Democratic | 1944–1945 |
| George Brain | Liberal | 1945–1968 |
| Laurie McGinty | Liberal | 1968–1977 |
| Laurie McGinty | Independent Liberal | 1977–1978 |
| Eddie Britt | Labor | 1978–1981 |
| Peter Collins | Liberal | 1981–1988 |
Fourth incarnation (1991–present)
| Member | Party | Term |
| Peter Collins | Liberal | 1991–2003 |
| Gladys Berejiklian | Liberal | 2003–2021 |
| Tim James | Liberal | 2022–present |

== Election results ==
2023 New South Wales state election: Willoughby
| Party | Candidate | Votes | % | ±% |
|---|---|---|---|---|
| Liberal | Tim James | 23,032 | 43.6 | −13.4 |
| Independent | Larissa Penn | 14,064 | 26.6 | +17.6 |
| Labor | Sarah Griffin | 10,577 | 20.0 | +5.3 |
| Greens | Edmund McGrath | 4,190 | 7.9 | −3.4 |
| Sustainable Australia | Michael Want | 967 | 1.8 | +0.1 |
| Total formal votes | | 52,830 | 98.1 | +0.1 |
| Informal votes | | 1,014 | 1.9 | −0.1 |
| Turnout | | 53,844 | 89.3 | +0.0 |
Notional two-party-preferred count
| Liberal | Tim James | 26,152 | 55.9 | −14.8 |
| Labor | Sarah Griffin | 20,665 | 44.1 | +14.8 |
Two-candidate-preferred result
| Liberal | Tim James | 24,727 | 52.6 | −21.0 |
| Independent | Larissa Penn | 22,277 | 47.4 | +21.0 |
| Liberal hold | | Swing | −21.0 | |
