= George Howarth (Australian politician) =

Australian politician (1854–1908)

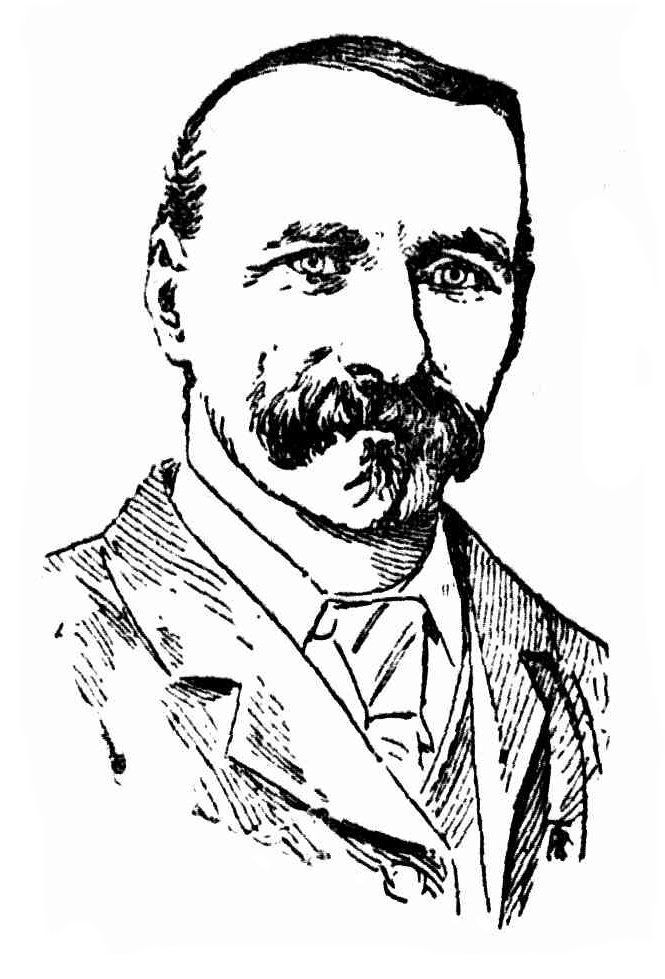

Member of the New South Wales Legislative Assembly for Willoughby
- In office 24 July 1895 – 21 August 1903
- Preceded by: Edward Clark
- Succeeded by: Charles Wade

Personal details
- Born: 1854 Kent, England
- Died: 28 June 1908 (aged 54) Colyton, New South Wales, Australia
- Spouse: Ellen Elizabeth Hammond (m. 1891)
- Children: 3
- Occupation: Politician

George Howarth (1854 – 28 June 1908) was an English-born Australian politician. He arrived in Australia in 1876 and, after engaging in a variety of occupations, he settled in Chatswood, on the Lower North Shore of Sydney. Howarth was elected as an alderman of Willoughby Municipal Council in 1892. After several unsuccessful attempts he was elected as the member for the Willoughby electorate in 1895, representing the Free Trade Party. He held the seat until 1903, but resigned from parliament after being charged with the fraudulent use of funds belonging to his wife's cousin followed by financial problems and bankruptcy proceedings.

== Early life ==
George Howarth was born in 1854 in county Kent, England.

After leaving school Howarth became a mariner.

=== Australia ===
Howarth arrived in Australia in 1876. He found work as a master mariner for the Melbourne Harbour Trust, which was established in 1877.

In 1882 Howarth was employed as the quarter-master aboard the clipper ship Thessalus on a voyage to Calcutta.

Howarth arrived at Sydney in about 1883. He found work as a wool presser on pastoral properties on the Lachlan River. He later worked at a wool wash facility at Booligal.

After returning to Sydney, Howarth was employed as a "staff surveyor" in the New South Wales Department of Lands under the supervision of the licensed surveyor George Knibbs. He was later employed in a similar capacity under James Frederick Truscott.

During the period 1887 to 1895 Howarth was employed in Joseph Hammond's butchering business at Chatswood, on the Lower North Shore of Sydney.

In 1888 Howarth began to attend lectures on political economy at Sydney University.

== Political career ==
In February 1892 George Howarth was elected as an alderman for the Chatsworth ward of the Willoughby Municipal Council. He was re-elected as an alderman in 1893 and 1894. In February 1895 Howarth was elected as an alderman for the Chatsworth ward.

Howarth's first attempt to win a seat in the New South Wales Legislative Assembly was at the 1894 general election. He was one of seven candidates that contested the seat of Willoughby, an electorate split from the larger St. Leonards electorate after multi-member electorates were abolished in 1893. Howarth was selected as a candidate for the Free Trade and Land Reform League. At the election held on 14 July 1894 Joseph Cullen of the Free Trade Party, who had previously been one of the members for St. Leonards, won the seat with 39.4 percent of the vote. Howarth polled third behind the protectionist candidate, attaining a respectable 22.8 percent of the vote.

In November 1894, just four months after the general election, Joseph Cullen was required to resign his seat after filing for bankruptcy. Cullen immediately offered himself for re-election at the by-election which was held on 30 November 1894. He was opposed by two other candidates, Howarth and Edward M. Clark (who had also previously been a member for the St. Leonards electorate). All three candidates contested the election as Free Trade Party candidates. In a closely fought by-election Clark was elected to the seat with 39.5 percent of the vote. Howarth polled third with 26.2 percent.

The Free Trade Party under the leadership of George Reid dominated the New South Wales Legislative Assembly after the July 1894 election. However, after the party's legislative reform agenda was subjected to obstruction by the Legislative Council, Reid went to a general election a year later in an effort to strengthen his mandate for reform. At this election E. M. Clark was selected as the Free Trade Party candidate for the neighbouring St. Leonards electorate and Howarth was chosen as the Party's nominee for the Willoughby electorate. Howarth was opposed by two others, a Protectionist Party candidate and Joseph Cullen, standing as an independent free trade candidate. At the election held on 24 July 1895 Howarth was elected to the seat of Willoughby with 850 votes (55.9 percent).

Howarth contested the seat of Willoughby for the Free Trade Party at the 1898 general election against five other candidates, including Cullen standing as a protectionist candidate, identified by then as representing the National Federal Party (reflecting a focus on Federation as an election issue). At the election held on 27 July 1898 Howarth was re-elected with 980 votes (47.8 percent).

In June 1899 Howarth purchased a part-share in a mine situated in the Burragorang Valley in the Blue Mountains. The company, named The Feldworth Silver-mining Company with Howarth as manager, was registered in August 1899.

In July 1900 the Chatswood East ward was added to the Willoughby Municipal Council and the number of aldermen was increased to twelve. Howarth was elected as an alderman, but he and another councillor were required to face a fresh election "owing to informalities in their nominations". Howarth was returned, but at the municipal elections in February 1901 he was defeated in the contest for the Chatswood East ward.

Howarth was re-elected to the seat of Willoughby for the Liberal Reform Party (evolved from the Free Trade Party) at the 1901 general election. At the election held on 3 July 1901 Howarth was re-elected with 1,671 votes (57.9 percent), opposed by an independent liberal and Labour Electoral League candidates.

=== Court case ===
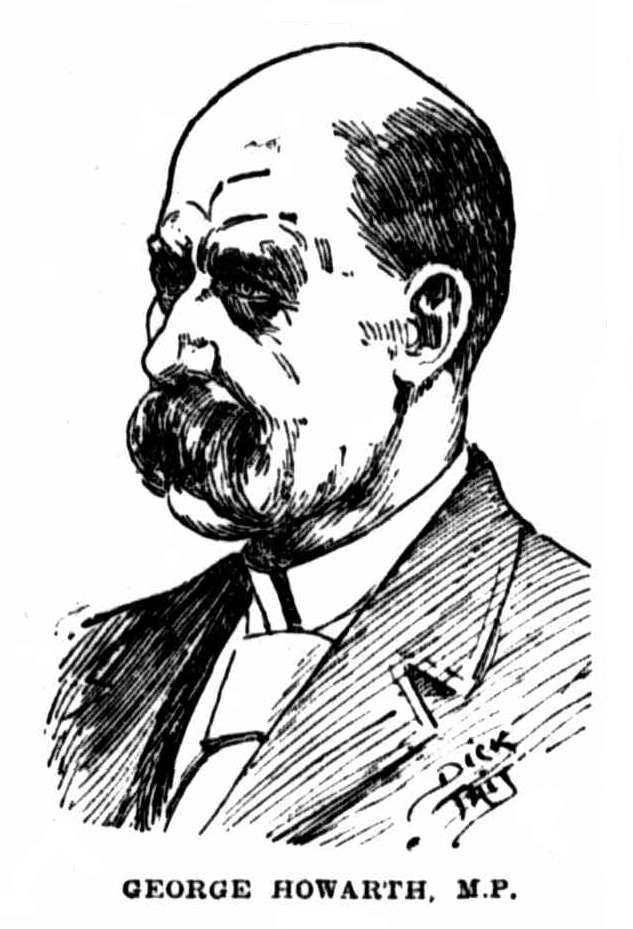
A courtroom illustration of George Howarth, published in Truth newspaper, 26 April 1903.

On 30 March 1903 the case of John Hammond against George Howarth was called at the Central Criminal Court, charging Howarth "with larceny as a bailee". It was alleged that in September and October 1901 he fraudulently converted "to his own use" two sums, totalling £372 pounds, belonging to Hammond. Howarth did not appear at the hearing despite being summonsed, as he was reported to be "suffering from illness". The judge then ordered a warrant for his arrest.

At the Central Police Court on 21 April 1903 Howarth was charged with fraud. The prosecutor, John Hammond, a butcher with a business at St. Peters, gave evidence that in 1901 he had asked Howarth to get his money out of the Australian Joint Stock Bank, held there as a term deposit amounting to six hundred pounds. Hammond was related to Howarth by marriage (his wife's cousin) and sought to use Howarth's authority as a member of parliament with the bank. He handed Howarth the deposit receipts and a written authority to withdraw the money. After having gone to the bank Howarth told Hammond that he could only get £475 for the £600 "and remarked that it was rather rough". The next day Howarth gave evidence in his defense, claiming that Hammond had agreed to loan the money to him. The magistrate then decided to send the case to a higher court, the outcome to be determined by a jury.

The charge against Howarth was heard before a judge and jury on 13 May 1903 at the Darlinghurst Quarter Sessions. After the jury had deliberated for three hours they advised the judge they were unable to agree and were then locked up for the night. Quarters were provided for Howarth to spend the night at the courthouse. The next morning the jury foreman announced that they had failed to agree on a verdict and the jury was discharged. Howarth was then remanded and allowed bail.

On 17 August 1903 a petition against Howarth was lodged in the Bankruptcy Court by creditors with claims against him. The seat for the Willoughby electorate became vacant on 21 August 1903 and Howarth announced that he would not seek re-election. Howarth failed to attend a meeting and public examination in the Bankruptcy Court in October 1903. The official assignee reported that Howarth could not be found, had not filed his statement of affairs and the petitioning creditor had not been able to serve the sequestration order.

== Personal life ==
In 1891 Howarth married the eldest daughter of his employer, Joseph Hammond. George Howarth and Ellen Elizabeth Hammond were married on 26 January 1891 in South Chatswood Methodist Church at Chatswood. The couple had three children, born from 1892 to 1896.

== Later life and death ==
After he resigned as a member of the New South Wales Legislative Assembly Howarth became a storekeeper.

George Howarth died "rather suddenly of heart failure" on 28 June 1908, aged 54, at his residence at Colyton in the St. Marys district of western Sydney. He was buried at Gore Hill cemetery with Methodist rites.

Howarth's widow, married William Wainwright in 1911 at Canterbury, New South Wales.

New South Wales Legislative Assembly
Preceded by Edward Clark	Member for Willoughby; 1895–1903	Succeeded by Charles Wade
