= Charles Wade =

Australian politician

The Honourable Sir Charles Wade KCMG KC JP
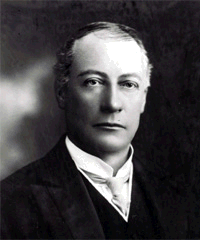

Justice of the Supreme Court of New South Wales
- In office 15 March 1920 – 26 September 1922

17th Premier of New South Wales
- In office 2 October 1907 – 1 October 1910
- Governor: Sir Harry Rawson; Lord Chelmsford
- Preceded by: Sir Joseph Carruthers
- Succeeded by: James McGowen

Member of the New South Wales Parliament for Gordon
- In office 6 August 1904 – 21 February 1917
- Preceded by: New district
- Succeeded by: Thomas Bavin

Personal details
- Born: 26 January 1863 Singleton, Colony of New South Wales, Australia
- Died: 26 September 1922 (aged 59) Potts Point, New South Wales, Australia

Sir Charles Gregory Wade KCMG, KC, JP (26 January 1863 – 26 September 1922) was Premier of New South Wales 2 October 1907 – 21 October 1910.

== Early years ==
Charles Gregory Wade was born in Singleton, New South Wales. He was the son of William Burton Wade, a civil engineer. Educated at All Saints College, Bathurst, and The King's School, Parramatta. Wade won the Broughton and Forrest scholarships and went to Merton College, Oxford. He graduated with a Bachelor of Arts (B.A.) with honours in classics in 1884.

Wade's rugby playing career included the Oxford University RUFC and, eight times capped for England (he played for England in the first Home Championship, becoming first to score a hat-trick of tries when playing against Wales). He also played rugby for Sydney's Wallaroo FC, London's Richmond FC and NSW Waratahs. Wade played county cricket for Herefordshire and Shropshire between 1881 and 1884, and also excelled at lawn tennis, rowing and target shooting.

He was called to the bar at the Inner Temple in 1886. He married Ella Louise Bell, and successfully prosecuted George Dean for attempted murder in a notorious case in 1895. He was an acting Judge of the District Court between 1896 and 1902. From 1902, he represented employers before the new Industrial Arbitration Court.

== Political career ==
In September 1903, he ran successfully for the Legislative Assembly seat of Willoughby, with the support of the Liberal and Reform Association, People's Reform League, New South Wales Alliance for the Suppression of Intemperance, Loyal Orange Institution and Australian Protestant Defence Association. From 1904 to 1917, he represented Gordon.

Within a year of his first election he joined the Carruthers ministry as Attorney-General and Minister for Justice.

During the 1909–10 coal strike, Wade appeared to favour the mine-owners and lost significant community support.

In November 1916 there was a split in the Labor party on the issue of conscription, with premier William Holman and 17 other pro-conscription Labor MPs were expelled from the party on the issue. The eighteen formed a grand coalition with Liberal Reform, giving the coalition a majority in parliament, with Holman remaining Premier.

He thus had no role when Liberal Reform merged with Holman's pro-conscription ex-Labor MPs a few months later to form the New South Wales branch of the Nationalist Party of Australia, though the new party was dominated by Liberal Reformers.

Wade died after a heart attack at his house at the Sydney suburb of Potts Point on 26 September 1922 (aged 59) and was survived by Lady Wade, two sons and two daughters.

His funeral was held at St Andrew's Cathedral, Sydney on 22 September 1922. He was buried at South Head Cemetery on the same day.

== Honours ==
Wade became a King's Counsel on 6 March 1905, was knighted in 1918, and was created KCMG on 5 June 1920.

== See also ==
- List of Six Nations Championship hat-tricks

Parliament of New South Wales
Political offices
Preceded by Joseph Carruthers	Premier; 1907–1910	Succeeded by James McGowen
Preceded by James Gannon	Attorney General of New South Wales; 1904–1910	Succeeded by William Holman
Preceded by Thomas Waddell	Minister of Justice; 1904–1909	Succeeded by John Garland
Preceded by James McGowen	Leader of the Opposition; 1910–1916	Succeeded by Ernest Durack
New South Wales Legislative Assembly
Preceded by George Howarth	Member for Willoughby; 1903–1904	Succeeded by Edward Larkin
New district	Member for Gordon; 1904–1917	Succeeded by Thomas Bavin
Party political offices
Preceded by Sir Joseph Carruthers	Leader of the Liberal Reform Party; 1907–1916	Merged into Nationalist Party
Diplomatic posts
Preceded by Sir Timothy Coghlan	Agent-General for New South Wales; 1917–1919	Succeeded by David Hall
