= Electoral results for the district of Gordon (New South Wales) =

Election results for Gordon, New South Wales, Australia

Gordon, an electoral district of the Legislative Assembly in the Australian state of New South Wales had two incarnations, from 1904 until 1920 and from 1927 until 1999.

Election	Member	Party
1904	Charles Wade	Liberal Reform
1907	Charles Wade	Liberal Reform
1910	Charles Wade	Liberal Reform
1913	Charles Wade	Liberal Reform
1917	Thomas Bavin	Nationalist
Election	Member	Party
1927	Sir Thomas Bavin	Nationalist
1930	Sir Thomas Bavin	Nationalist
1932	Sir Thomas Bavin	United Australia
1935	Sir Thomas Bavin	United Australia
1935 by	Sir Philip Goldfinch	United Australia
1937 by	Harry Turner	United Australia
1938	Harry Turner	United Australia
1938 by	Harry Turner	United Australia
1941	Harry Turner	United Australia
1944	Harry Turner	Democratic
1947	Harry Turner	Liberal
1950	Harry Turner	Liberal
1953	Stewart Fraser	Liberal
1956	Stewart Fraser	Liberal
1959	Stewart Fraser	Liberal / Independent
1962	Harry Jago	Liberal
1965	Harry Jago	Liberal
1968	Harry Jago	Liberal
1971	Harry Jago	Liberal
1973	Kevin Harrold	Democratic Labor
1976	Tim Moore	Liberal
1978	Tim Moore	Liberal
1981	Tim Moore	Liberal
1984	Tim Moore	Liberal
1988	Tim Moore	Liberal
1991	Tim Moore	Liberal
1992	Jeremy Kinross	Liberal
1995	Jeremy Kinross	Liberal

== Election results ==
=== Elections in the 1990s ===
==== 1995 ====
1995 New South Wales state election: Gordon
Party	Candidate	Votes	%	±%
Liberal	Jeremy Kinross	22,928	68.0	−6.5
Labor	Jan Butland	4,174	12.4	+1.1
Democrats	Ann Barry	2,635	7.8	−2.6
Greens	Ross Knowles	2,009	6.0	+6.0
Stop Dual Occupancy	Tanya Wood	1,102	3.3	+3.3
Call to Australia	Margaret Ratcliffe	700	2.1	−1.8
Citizens Electoral Council	Leone Hay	156	0.5	+0.5
Total formal votes		33,704	96.8	+2.7
Informal votes		1,106	3.2	−2.7
Turnout		34,810	93.4	
Two-party-preferred result
Liberal	Jeremy Kinross	25,108	80.3	−3.3
Labor	Jan Butland	6,171	19.7	+3.3
Liberal hold		Swing	−3.3	

==== 1992 by-election ====
1992 Gordon by-election Saturday 22 August
Party	Candidate	Votes	%	±%
Liberal	Jeremy Kinross	19,832	69.02	−6.5
Independent	David Barnett	4,481	15.60	
Citizens Electoral Council	Leone Hay	1,903	6.62	
Marie Bignold Team	Marie Bignold	1,844	6.42	
Call to Australia	Bruce Coleman	673	2.34	−1.5
Total formal votes		28,733	95.15	
Informal votes		1,465	4.85	
Turnout		30,198	80.17	
Two-party-preferred result
Liberal	Jeremy Kinross	20,999	77.85	−5.7
Independent	David Barnett	5,975	22.15	22.15
Liberal hold		Swing	−5.7	

Tim Moore (Liberal) resigned.

==== 1991 ====
1991 New South Wales state election: Gordon
Party	Candidate	Votes	%	±%
Liberal	Tim Moore	23,984	74.5	−4.9
Labor	Ian Latham	3,617	11.2	−4.1
Democrats	Michelle Herfurth	3,350	10.4	+5.2
Call to Australia	John Swan	1,244	3.9	+3.9
Total formal votes		32,195	94.1	−3.6
Informal votes		2,019	5.9	+3.6
Turnout		34,214	92.7	
Two-party-preferred result
Liberal	Tim Moore	25,505	83.5	+1.3
Labor	Ian Latham	5,023	16.5	−1.3
Liberal hold		Swing	+1.3	

=== Elections in the 1980s ===
==== 1988 ====
1988 New South Wales state election: Gordon
Party	Candidate	Votes	%	±%
Liberal	Tim Moore	22,986	77.9	+0.3
Labor	Simon Jeans	3,719	12.6	−4.7
Democrats	Fiona Richardson	2,784	9.4	+4.4
Total formal votes		29,489	97.5	−0.5
Informal votes		762	2.5	+0.5
Turnout		30,251	93.8	
Two-party-preferred result
Liberal	Tim Moore	23,764	82.9	+2.6
Labor	Simon Jeans	4,885	17.1	−2.6
Liberal hold		Swing	+2.6	

==== 1984 ====
1984 New South Wales state election: Gordon
Party	Candidate	Votes	%	±%
Liberal	Tim Moore	22,762	77.7	+5.6
Labor	Robert Dubler	5,083	17.4	−3.1
Democrats	Kevin Gartrell-Wardale	1,452	5.0	−2.3
Total formal votes		29,297	98.0	+0.2
Informal votes		602	2.0	−0.2
Turnout		29,899	92.6	+2.2
Two-party-preferred result
Liberal	Tim Moore		80.3	+3.1
Labor	Robert Dubler		19.7	−3.1
Liberal hold		Swing	+3.1	

==== 1981 ====
1981 New South Wales state election: Gordon
Party	Candidate	Votes	%	±%
Liberal	Tim Moore	20,594	72.1	+2.9
Labor	George Doumanis	5,862	20.5	−3.4
Democrats	Ilse Robey	2,087	7.3	+0.4
Total formal votes		28,543	97.8	
Informal votes		631	2.2	
Turnout		29,174	90.4	
Two-party-preferred result
Liberal	Tim Moore	20,894	77.2	+3.2
Labor	George Doumanis	6,162	22.8	−3.2
Liberal hold		Swing	+3.2	

=== Elections in the 1970s ===
==== 1978 ====
1978 New South Wales state election: Gordon
Party	Candidate	Votes	%	±%
Liberal	Tim Moore	18,925	69.2	+4.3
Labor	Arthur Litchfield	6,530	23.9	+7.1
Democrats	Ilse Robey	1,879	6.9	+6.9
Total formal votes		27,334	98.4	−0.4
Informal votes		429	1.6	+0.4
Turnout		27,763	90.9	−2.3
Two-party-preferred result
Liberal	Tim Moore	20,215	74.0	−7.5
Labor	Arthur Litchfield	7,119	26.0	+7.5
Liberal hold		Swing	−7.5	

==== 1976 ====
1976 New South Wales state election: Gordon
Party	Candidate	Votes	%	±%
Liberal	Tim Moore	18,168	64.9	+64.9
Labor	Margaret Atkin	4,695	16.8	−3.8
Democratic Labor	Kevin Harrold	2,201	7.9	−71.5
Independent	John Harris	1,789	6.4	+6.4
Workers	Christopher Brown	1,147	4.1	+4.1
Total formal votes		28,000	98.8	+2.5
Informal votes		349	1.2	−2.5
Turnout		28,349	93.2	+0.9
Two-party-preferred result
Liberal	Tim Moore	22,815	81.5	+81.5
Labor	Margaret Atkin	5,185	18.5	−2.1
Liberal gain from Democratic Labor		Swing	N/A	

==== 1973 ====
1973 New South Wales state election: Gordon
Party	Candidate	Votes	%	±%
Democratic Labor	Kevin Harrold	20,707	79.4	+61.0
Labor	Miron Shapira	5,372	20.6	+20.6
Total formal votes		26,079	96.3	
Informal votes		1,004	3.7	
Turnout		27,083	92.3	
Democratic Labor gain from Liberal		Swing	N/A	

The sitting member was Harry Jago (Liberal) who failed to nominate in time.

==== 1971 ====
1971 New South Wales state election: Gordon
Party	Candidate	Votes	%	±%
Liberal	Harry Jago	20,074	81.6	−0.2
Democratic Labor	Allan Dwyer	4,530	18.4	+12.9
Total formal votes		24,604	94.4	
Informal votes		1,452	5.6	
Turnout		26,056	91.8	
Liberal hold		Swing	−4.6	

=== Elections in the 1960s ===
==== 1968 ====
1968 New South Wales state election: Gordon
Party	Candidate	Votes	%	±%
Liberal	Harry Jago	20,099	81.8	−6.4
Labor	Norman Hanscombe	3,127	12.7	+12.7
Democratic Labor	Dominique Droulers	1,346	5.5	−6.3
Total formal votes		24,572	97.0	
Informal votes		771	3.0	
Turnout		25,343	92.8	
Two-party-preferred result
Liberal	Harry Jago	21,176	86.2	−2.0
Labor	Norman Hanscombe	3,396	13.8	+13.8
Liberal hold		Swing	−2.0	

==== 1965 ====
1965 New South Wales state election: Gordon
Party	Candidate	Votes	%	±%
Liberal	Harry Jago	22,870	88.2	+38.9
Democratic Labor	Dominique Droulers	3,066	11.8	+7.2
Total formal votes		25,936	95.6	−2.4
Informal votes		1,183	4.4	+2.4
Turnout		27,119	91.8	−1.9
Liberal hold		Swing	N/A	

==== 1962 ====
1962 New South Wales state election: Gordon
Party	Candidate	Votes	%	±%
Liberal	Harry Jago	12,872	49.3	
Independent	Stewart Fraser (defeated)	7,872	30.2	
Independent	Phyllis Atkins	2,216	8.5	
Independent	George Nicol	1,941	7.4	
Democratic Labor	Dominique Droulers	1,194	4.6	
Total formal votes		26,095	98.0	
Informal votes		529	2.0	
Turnout		26,624	93.7	
Two-candidate-preferred result
Liberal	Harry Jago	15,156	58.1	
Independent	Stewart Fraser	10,939	41.9	
Liberal hold		Swing	N/A	

Stewart Fraser was the sitting Liberal member however he lost pre-selection.

=== Elections in the 1950s ===
==== 1959 ====
1959 New South Wales state election: Gordon
Party	Candidate	Votes	%	±%
Liberal	Stewart Fraser	unopposed		
Liberal hold				

==== 1956 ====
1956 New South Wales state election: Gordon
Party	Candidate	Votes	%	±%
Liberal	Stewart Fraser	unopposed		
Liberal hold				

==== 1953 ====
1953 New South Wales state election: Gordon
Party	Candidate	Votes	%	±%
Liberal	Stewart Fraser	unopposed		
Liberal hold				

==== 1950 ====
1950 New South Wales state election: Gordon
Party	Candidate	Votes	%	±%
Liberal	Harry Turner	unopposed		
Liberal hold				

=== Elections in the 1940s ===
==== 1947 ====
1947 New South Wales state election: Gordon
Party	Candidate	Votes	%	±%
Liberal	Harry Turner	19,241	84.3	+12.7
Independent	James O'Toole	3,572	15.7	+15.7
Total formal votes		22,813	98.5	+1.5
Informal votes		344	1.5	−1.5
Turnout		23,157	92.6	−0.2
Liberal hold		Swing	N/A	

==== 1944 ====
1944 New South Wales state election: Gordon
Party	Candidate	Votes	%	±%
Democratic	Harry Turner	15,076	71.6	
Liberal Democratic	Kenneth Lorimer	5,972	28.4	
Total formal votes		21,048	97.0	
Informal votes		658	3.0	
Turnout		21,706	92.8	
Democratic hold		Swing	N/A	

==== 1941 ====
1941 New South Wales state election: Gordon
Party	Candidate	Votes	%	±%
United Australia	Harry Turner	unopposed		
United Australia hold				

=== Elections in the 1930s ===
==== 1938 by-election ====
1938 Gordon by-election Saturday 24 September
Party	Candidate	Votes	%	±%
United Australia	Harry Turner (re-elected)	12,421	59.97	
United Australia	William Milne	8,291	40.03	
Total formal votes		20,712	97.96	
Informal votes		431	2.04	
Turnout		21,143	91.99	
United Australia hold		Swing		

The by-election was held because the Court of Disputed Returns declared that the election of Harry Turner at the 1938 Gordon election was void.

==== 1938 ====
1938 New South Wales state election: Gordon
Party	Candidate	Votes	%	±%
United Australia	Harry Turner	10,557	50.02	
United Australia	William Milne	10,548	49.98	
Total formal votes		21,105	96.6	
Informal votes		739	3.4	
Turnout		21,844	95.1	
United Australia hold		Swing	N/A	

==== 1937 by-election ====
1937 Gordon by-election Saturday 7 August
Party	Candidate	Votes	%	±%
United Australia	Harry Turner	11,902	61.82	
Independent	Sydney Storey	7,351	38.18	
Total formal votes		19,253	98.00	
Informal votes		393	2.00	
Turnout		19,646	89.54	
United Australia hold		Swing	N/A	

The by-election was caused by resignation of Sir Philip Goldfinch (United Australia).

==== 1935 by-election ====
1935 Gordon by-election Friday 8 November 1935
Party	Candidate	Votes	%	±%
United Australia	Sir Philip Goldfinch	unopposed		
United Australia hold				

The by-election was caused by resignation of Sir Thomas Bavin (United Australia) who had accepted an appointment as a Judge of the Supreme Court.

==== 1935 ====
1935 New South Wales state election: Gordon
Party	Candidate	Votes	%	±%
United Australia	Thomas Bavin	unopposed		
United Australia hold				

==== 1932 ====
1932 New South Wales state election: Gordon
Party	Candidate	Votes	%	±%
United Australia	Thomas Bavin	16,112	87.4	+9.6
Labor (NSW)	George Smart	2,326	12.6	−8.8
Total formal votes		18,438	98.5	+0.3
Informal votes		280	1.5	−0.3
Turnout		18,718	96.0	+0.5
United Australia hold		Swing	N/A	

==== 1930 ====
1930 New South Wales state election: Gordon
Party	Candidate	Votes	%	±%
Nationalist	Thomas Bavin	13,951	77.8	
Labor	Albert Kitchen	3,840	21.4	
Communist	Esmonde Higgins	147	0.8	
Total formal votes		17,938	98.2	
Informal votes		323	1.8	
Turnout		18,261	95.5	
Nationalist hold		Swing		

=== Elections in the 1920s ===
==== 1927 ====
1927 New South Wales state election: Gordon
Party	Candidate	Votes	%	±%
Nationalist	Thomas Bavin	11,799	87.0	
Labor	Oscar Mostyn	1,768	13.0	
Total formal votes		13,567	99.1	
Informal votes		129	0.9	
Turnout		13,696	85.3	
Nationalist win		(new seat)		

=== Elections in the 1910s ===
==== 1917 ====
1917 New South Wales state election: Gordon
Party	Candidate	Votes	%	±%
Ind. Nationalist	Edward Loxton	3,822	35.2	+35.2
Nationalist	Thomas Bavin	2,928	26.9	−42.0
Ind. Nationalist	Robert Forsyth	2,753	25.3	+25.3
Ind. Nationalist	Fitt Petrie	1,366	12.6	+12.6
Total formal votes		10,869	99.2	+1.1
Informal votes		89	0.8	−1.1
Turnout		10,958	62.7	−7.7

1917 New South Wales state election: Gordon - Second Round
Party	Candidate	Votes	%	±%
Nationalist	Thomas Bavin	5,612	50.2	−18.7
Ind. Nationalist	Edward Loxton	5,573	49.8	+49.8
Total formal votes		11,185	99.7	+0.5
Informal votes		28	0.3	−0.5
Turnout		11,213	64.2	+1.5
Nationalist hold				

The sitting member was Charles Wade (Nationalist) who did not contest the election.

==== 1913 ====
1913 New South Wales state election: Gordon
Party	Candidate	Votes	%	±%
Liberal Reform	Charles Wade	6,335	68.9	
Labor	Frederick Cowdroy	2,863	31.1	
Total formal votes		9,198	98.1	
Informal votes		177	1.9	
Turnout		9,375	70.4	
Liberal Reform hold				

==== 1910 ====
1910 New South Wales state election: Gordon
Party	Candidate	Votes	%	±%
Liberal Reform	Charles Wade	6,497	71.2	
Labour	Conrad Von Hagen	2,624	28.8	
Total formal votes		9,121	98.2	
Informal votes		168	1.8	
Turnout		9,289	74.6	
Liberal Reform hold				

=== Elections in the 1900s ===
==== 1907 ====
1907 New South Wales state election: Gordon
Party	Candidate	Votes	%	±%
Liberal Reform	Charles Wade	5,156	73.6	
Labour	Sydney Hutton	1,854	26.5	
Total formal votes		7,010	97.2	
Informal votes		203	2.8	
Turnout		7,213	74.1	
Liberal Reform hold				

==== 1904 ====
1904 New South Wales state election: Gordon
Party	Candidate	Votes	%	±%
Liberal Reform	Charles Wade	3,115	78.1	
Labour	Arthur Porter	873	21.9	
Total formal votes		3,988	98.5	
Informal votes		61	1.5	
Turnout		4,049	53.8	
Liberal Reform win		(new seat)		

Gordon was a new seat and consisted of part of the abolished seat of Willoughby. The member for Willoughby was Charles Wade (Liberal Reform).
