= List of elections in 1938 =

The following elections occurred in the year 1938.

== Africa ==
- 1938 Egyptian parliamentary election
- 1938 South African general election

== Asia ==
- 1938 Egyptian parliamentary election
- 1938 Philippine general election
- 1938 Philippine legislative election
- 1938 Siamese general election
- 1938 Soviet Union regional elections
- 1938 Turkish presidential election

== Europe ==
- 1938 Bulgarian parliamentary election
- 1938 Czechoslovak presidential election
- 1938 Estonian parliamentary election
- 1938 Estonian presidential election
- 1938 Irish general election
- 1938 Irish presidential election
- 1938 Kingdom of Yugoslavia parliamentary election
- 1938 Polish legislative election
- 1938 Portuguese legislative election
- 1938 Romanian constitutional referendum
- 1938 San Marino general election
- 1938 Soviet Union regional elections
- 1938 German election and referendum
- 1938 Turkish presidential election

=== United Kingdom ===
- 1938 Aylesbury by-election
- 1938 Barnsley by-election
- 1938 Bridgwater by-election
- 1938 City of London by-election
- 1938 Combined Scottish Universities by-election
- 1938 Dartford by-election
- 1938 Farnworth by-election
- 1938 Fulham West by-election
- 1938 Ipswich by-election
- 1938 Lewisham West by-election
- 1938 Lichfield by-election
- 1938 Northern Ireland general election
- 1938 Oxford by-election
- 1938 Pontypridd by-election
- 1938 Stafford by-election
- 1938 Walsall by-election
- 1938 Willesden East by-election

== North America ==
- 1938 Costa Rican parliamentary election
- Nicaraguan Constitutional Assembly election, 1938

=== Canada ===
- 1938 Conservative Party of Ontario leadership election
- 1938 Edmonton municipal election
- 1938 Ottawa municipal election
- 1938 Saskatchewan general election

=== Caribbean ===
- 1938 Cuban parliamentary election
- 1938 Dominican Republic general election

=== United States ===
- 1938 New York state election
- 1938 United States elections

==== United States lieutenant gubernatorial ====
- 1938 California lieutenant gubernatorial election
- 1938 Connecticut lieutenant gubernatorial election
- 1938 Minnesota lieutenant gubernatorial election
- 1938 Nebraska lieutenant gubernatorial election
- 1938 Texas lieutenant gubernatorial election
- 1938 Wisconsin lieutenant gubernatorial election

==== United States gubernatorial ====
- 1938 Alabama gubernatorial election
- 1938 Arizona gubernatorial election
- 1938 Arkansas gubernatorial election
- 1938 California gubernatorial election
- 1938 Colorado gubernatorial election
- 1938 Connecticut gubernatorial election
- 1938 Georgia gubernatorial election
- 1938 Idaho gubernatorial election
- 1938 Iowa gubernatorial election
- 1938 Kansas gubernatorial election
- 1938 Maine gubernatorial election
- 1938 Maryland gubernatorial election
- 1938 Massachusetts gubernatorial election
- 1938 Michigan gubernatorial election
- 1938 Minnesota gubernatorial election
- 1938 Nebraska gubernatorial election
- 1938 Nevada gubernatorial election
- 1938 New Hampshire gubernatorial election
- 1938 New Mexico gubernatorial election
- 1938 New York gubernatorial election
- 1938 North Dakota gubernatorial election
- 1938 Ohio gubernatorial election
- 1938 Oklahoma gubernatorial election
- 1938 Oregon gubernatorial election
- 1938 Pennsylvania gubernatorial election
- 1938 Rhode Island gubernatorial election
- 1938 South Carolina gubernatorial election
- 1938 South Dakota gubernatorial election
- 1938 Tennessee gubernatorial election
- 1938 Texas gubernatorial election
- 1938 United States gubernatorial elections
- 1938 Vermont gubernatorial election
- 1938 Wisconsin gubernatorial election
- 1938 Wyoming gubernatorial election

==== United States House of Representatives ====
- 1938 United States House of Representatives elections
- 1938 United States House of Representatives elections in California
- 1938 United States House of Representatives elections in South Carolina

==== United States Senate ====
- 1938 United States Senate elections
- 1938 United States Senate election in Alabama
- 1938 United States Senate election in Arizona
- 1938 United States Senate election in Arkansas
- 1938 United States Senate election in California
- 1938 United States Senate election in Colorado
- 1938 United States Senate election in Connecticut
- 1938 United States Senate election in Georgia
- 1938 United States Senate election in Idaho
- 1938 United States Senate election in Illinois
- 1938 United States Senate election in Indiana
- 1938 United States Senate election in Iowa
- 1938 United States Senate election in Kansas
- 1938 United States Senate election in Kentucky
- 1938 United States Senate election in Maryland
- 1938 United States Senate election in Missouri
- 1938 United States Senate election in New Hampshire
- 1938 United States Senate special election in New Jersey
- 1938 United States Senate election in New York
- 1938 United States Senate special election in New York
- 1938 United States Senate election in North Carolina
- 1938 United States Senate election in North Dakota
- 1938 United States Senate election in Oklahoma
- 1938 United States Senate election in Oregon
- 1938 United States Senate election in Pennsylvania
- 1938 United States Senate election in South Carolina
- 1938 United States Senate election in South Dakota
- 1938 United States Senate special election in Tennessee
- 1938 United States Senate election in Vermont
- 1938 United States Senate election in Washington
- 1938 United States Senate election in Wisconsin

==== United States mayoral elections ====
- 1938 Los Angeles mayoral recall election

== Oceania ==
- 1938 New Zealand general election

=== Australia ===
- 1938 Coogee state by-election
- 1938 Gordon state by-election
- 1938 New South Wales state election
- 1938 Queensland state election
- 1938 South Australian state election
- 1938 Wakefield by-election
- 1938 Wollondilly state by-election

== South America ==
- 1938 Bolivian legislative election
- 1938 Chilean presidential election
- 1938 Colombian presidential election
- 1938 Argentine legislative election
- 1938 Uruguayan general election
- 1938 Uruguayan constitutional referendum

== See also ==
- Category:1938 elections
