= 1937 Gordon state by-election =

Election result for Gordon, New South Wales, Australia

A by-election was held for the New South Wales Legislative Assembly electorate of Gordon on 7 August 1937 because of the resignation of Sir Philip Goldfinch (United Australia).

== Dates ==
Date	Event
5 July 1937	Sir Philip Goldfinch resigned.
16 July 1937	Writ of election issued by the Speaker of the Legislative Assembly.
27 July 1937	Nominations
7 August 1937	Polling day
19 August 1937	Return of writ

== Result ==
1937 Gordon by-election Saturday 7 August
Party	Candidate	Votes	%	±%
United Australia	Harry Turner	11,902	61.82	
Independent	Sydney Storey	7,351	38.18	
Total formal votes		19,253	98.00	
Informal votes		393	2.00	
Turnout		19,646	89.54	
United Australia hold		Swing	N/A	

== See also ==
- Electoral results for the district of Gordon
- List of New South Wales state by-elections
