= 1935 Gordon state by-election =

Election result for Gordon, New South Wales, Australia

A by-election was held for the New South Wales Legislative Assembly electorate of Gordon on 8 November 1935 because of the resignation of Sir Thomas Bavin (United Australia) who had accepted an appointment as a Judge of the Supreme Court.

== Dates ==
Date	Event
14 October 1935	Sir Thomas Bavin resigned.
1 November 1935	Writ of election issued by the Speaker of the Legislative Assembly.
8 November 1935	Nominations
23 November 1935	Polling day
6 December 1935	Return of writ

== Result ==
1935 Gordon by-election Friday 8 November 1935
Party	Candidate	Votes	%	±%
United Australia	Sir Philip Goldfinch	unopposed		
United Australia hold				

== See also ==
- Electoral results for the district of Gordon
- List of New South Wales state by-elections
