= 1992 Gordon state by-election =

- 2 May 1992

Electoral district of Gordon in the New South Wales Legislative Assembly
| | First party | Second party |
|---|---|---|
| | | IND |
| Candidate | Jeremy Kinross | David Barnett |
| Party | Liberal | Independent |
| Primary vote | 19,832 | 4,481 |
| Percentage | 69.02% | 15.60% |
| Swing | ▼6.50 | ▲15.60 |
| TCP | 77.85% | 22.15% |
| TCP swing | ▼5.70 | ▲22.15 |
MP before election
Tim Moore
Liberal
Elected MP
Jeremy Kinross
Liberal

A by-election was held for the New South Wales Legislative Assembly seat of Gordon on 2 May 1992 because of the resignation of Tim Moore, following the release of the findings of the Independent Commission Against Corruption into the 'Metherell Affair'.

The seat was comfortably won by Jeremy Kinross of the Liberal Party despite a 5.5% drop in the Liberal primary vote, and a 5.7% drop in their two party preferred vote.

== Background ==
The seat of Gordon, a traditionally safe Liberal seat, was held since 1976 by Tim Moore. However, with the hung parliament result of the 1991 election, the performance of the Greiner government had become dependent on the support of the few independent members of the legislative assembly. When former minister Terry Metherell resigned in October 1991 the government's ability to command a majority became even more difficult. The government subsequently created a job for Metherell, a position with the Environment Protection Agency, which he accepted, effectively engineering a vacancy in a seat the Liberal Party would recover at a by-election.

While the Liberal Party won the by-election, there was a much higher cost. Because the Greiner government was in a minority, it could not prevent the Legislative Assembly referring the matter of Metherell's appointment to the Independent Commission Against Corruption, which made findings of corruption. These findings were eventually ruled by the Supreme Court of New South Wales as being outside the powers of the ICAC to make, but by then Premier Greiner had already resigned as Premier and an MP after the four independent MPs threatened to bring down the government if Greiner stayed in office.

== Result ==
1992 Gordon by-election Saturday 22 August
| Party | Candidate | Votes | % | ±% |
|---|---|---|---|---|
| Liberal | Jeremy Kinross | 19,832 | 69.02 | −6.5 |
| Independent | David Barnett | 4,481 | 15.60 | |
| Citizens Electoral Council | Leone Hay | 1,903 | 6.62 | |
| Marie Bignold Team | Marie Bignold | 1,844 | 6.42 | |
| Call to Australia | Bruce Coleman | 673 | 2.34 | −1.5 |
| Total formal votes | | 28,733 | 95.15 | |
| Informal votes | | 1,465 | 4.85 | |
| Turnout | | 30,198 | 80.17 | |
Two-party-preferred result
| Liberal | Jeremy Kinross | 20,999 | 77.85 | −5.70 |
| Independent | David Barnett | 5,975 | 22.15 | +22.15 |
| Liberal hold | | | | |

== See also ==
- Electoral results for the district of Gordon (New South Wales)
- List of New South Wales state by-elections
