= March 1938 =

Month of 1938

<<	March 1938					>>
Su	Mo	Tu	We	Th	Fr	Sa
		1	2	3	4	5
6	7	8	9	10	11	12
13	14	15	16	17	18	19
20	21	22	23	24	25	26
27	28	29	30	31

The following events occurred in March 1938:

== March 1, 1938 (Tuesday) ==
- Hermann Göring was presented with a field marshal's baton by Adolf Hitler, who made the gesture to placate Göring for not giving him any new cabinet positions in last month's shake-up.
- 20,000 Nazis marched in Graz, Austria in defiance of government attempts to stop them.
- The Yosemite TWA crash occurred.
- Died: Gabriele D'Annunzio, 74, Italian writer and soldier

== March 2, 1938 (Wednesday) ==
- The special court trial against Martin Niemöller ended in Germany. He was cleared of the most serious charge against him, that of treason against the state, but was convicted of "endangering public security, exploiting the pulpit and incitement to resistance against the government". Niemöller was freed on time served but the Gestapo immediately took him back into "protective custody".
- The last of the Moscow Trials began with the Trial of the Twenty-One.
- Born: Ricardo Lagos, President of Chile, in Santiago
- Died: Ben Harney, 65, American songwriter, entertainer and pioneer of ragtime music

== March 3, 1938 (Thursday) ==
- The German Ministry of the Interior said that Martin Niemöller was still being held because the pastor "was determined to carry on agitation against the state, thereby endangering peace and order."
- The new United States Ambassador to Germany Hugh R. Wilson presented his credentials to Hitler.

== March 4, 1938 (Friday) ==
- The Supreme Court of Canada struck down the Accurate News and Information Act in Alberta as unconstitutional.
- Born: Angus MacLise, musician and poet, in Bridgeport, Connecticut (d. 1979)
- Don Perkins, NFL fullback, in Waterloo, Iowa (d. 2022)
- Paula Prentiss, actress, in San Antonio, Texas

== March 5, 1938 (Saturday) ==
- The Battle of Cape Palos, the biggest naval battle of the Spanish Civil War, began near Cartagena.
- German tennis star Gottfried von Cramm was arrested by the Nazis for homosexual activity.
- Bock beer was banned in Nazi Germany due to lack of barley. An exception was made for export purposes to obtain foreign currencies.

== March 6, 1938 (Sunday) ==
- The Battle of Cape Palos ended in a Republican victory. The cruiser Baleares was sunk.
- Japanese forces reached the Yellow River.

== March 7, 1938 (Monday) ==
- The Nationalists launched the Aragon Offensive.
- Born: David Baltimore, biologist and Nobel laureate, in New York City (d. 2025); Janet Guthrie, race car driver, in Iowa City, Iowa
- Died: James B. A. Robertson, 66, American lawyer, judge and 4th Governor of Oklahoma

== March 8, 1938 (Tuesday) ==
- Former U.S. President Herbert Hoover visited Adolf Hitler at the Chancellory in Berlin. Their hour-long conversation on issues such as housing, employment and agriculture was reportedly courteous.
- Born: Bruno Pizzul, journalist and footballer, in Udine, Italy (d. 2025)

== March 9, 1938 (Wednesday) ==
- Austrian Chancellor Kurt Schuschnigg announced a referendum for March 13 to determine the question of unification with Germany.
- Soviet Central Television broadcast for the first time.
- Born: Charles Siebert, television actor and director, in Kenosha, Wisconsin (d. 2022)

== March 10, 1938 (Thursday) ==
- Hitler ordered his generals to prepare for an invasion of Austria. No such military plans existed yet and the General Staff scrambled to draw some up.
- The 10th Academy Awards were held in Los Angeles, postponed one week by the Los Angeles flood. The Life of Emile Zola won Best Picture.
- The romantic drama film Jezebel starring Bette Davis (in the role that made her famous) and Henry Fonda premiered at Radio City Music Hall in New York.

== March 11, 1938 (Friday) ==
- Germany mobilized along the Austrian border threatening to invade. Chancellor Kurt Schuschnigg resigned over the radio and explained that the Austrian military had been instructed not to resist. Schuschnigg signed off with, "I say goodbye with the heartfelt wish that God will protect Austria."

== March 12, 1938 (Saturday) ==
- Anschluss: The German army crossed the Austrian border at 8:00 a.m.; Hitler's convoy arrived later that day. Arrests of thousands of potential opponents of the Nazis began.
- Francoist Spain repealed the Spanish Republic's civil marriage law.
- Died: Lyda Roberti, 31, Polish-born American actress (heart attack)

== March 13, 1938 (Sunday) ==
- The new Austrian Chancellor Arthur Seyss-Inquart proclaimed the Anschluss annexing the country to Germany. President Wilhelm Miklas refused to sign the document and resigned.
- Léon Blum became Prime Minister of France for the second time.
- Eighteen of the defendants in the Trial of the Twenty-One were sentenced to death.
- Russian language became a mandatory subject in all non-Russian schools of the Soviet Union.
- Born: Erma Franklin, gospel and R&B singer, in Shelby, Mississippi (d. 2002)
- Died: Clarence Darrow, 80, American lawyer
- Cevat Çobanlı, 67, Turkish general and veteran.

== March 14, 1938 (Monday) ==
- Hitler rode into Vienna triumphantly.
- British Prime Minister Neville Chamberlain made a speech in the House of Commons on the Austrian situation, saying the government "emphatically" disapproved of Germany's deed but that "nothing could have prevented this action by Germany unless we and others with us had been prepared to use force to prevent it."
- The Nationalists captured Alcañiz.
- Born: Eleanor Bron, actress and author, in Stanmore, England

== March 15, 1938 (Tuesday) ==
- Hitler made a speech in Vienna from the balcony of the Hofburg Palace overlooking the Heldenplatz, utilizing a symbol of the Habsburg monarchy to present himself as a continuation of leadership going back to the time of the Holy Roman Empire.
- Born: Bob Locker, baseball player, in George, Iowa (d. 2022)
- Died: Nikolai Bukharin, 49, Russian revolutionary (executed); Alexei Rykov, 57, Russian revolutionary and politician (executed)

== March 16, 1938 (Wednesday) ==
- Bombing of Barcelona: The Aviazione Legionaria began bombing Barcelona.
- The Battle of Caspe began.

== March 17, 1938 (Thursday) ==
- The Battle of Caspe ended in Nationalist victory with the capture of the city.
- Poland delivered an ultimatum to Lithuania demanding the establishment of diplomatic relations.
- France reopened the border with Spain.
- Hitler decreed that the Reichsmark would be legal tender in Austria alongside the schilling, at a fixed value of 1 Reichsmark to 1.5 shillings.
- Born: Rudolf Nureyev, dancer, near Irkutsk, USSR (d. 1993); Keith O'Brien, Roman Catholic bishop, in Ballycastle, County Antrim, Northern Ireland (d. 2018); Kris Biantoro, Indonesian singer and actor (d. 2013)

== March 18, 1938 (Friday) ==
- Hitler gave a speech to the Reichstag calling for new elections on April 10 as well as a referendum to approve the Anschluss.
- The Bombing of Barcelona severely damaged the city and left as many as 1,300 people dead.
- Mexican President Lázaro Cárdenas nationalized the assets of 17 foreign oil companies. The U.S. and British governments protested the policy but the Mexican public widely supported it.
- Werner von Fritsch was formally acquitted of the homosexuality charges against him.
- The Gun Law in Nazi Germany banned Jewish gun merchants.
- The musical comedy film Rebecca of Sunnybrook Farm starring Shirley Temple, Randolph Scott and Bill Robinson was released.
- Born: Shashi Kapoor, actor and film producer, in Calcutta, British India (d. 2017); Bob Nevin, ice hockey player, in Timmins, Ontario, Canada (d. 2020); Charley Pride, country musician, in Sledge, Mississippi (d. 2020)

== March 19, 1938 (Saturday) ==
- Lithuania capitulated to Poland's March 17 ultimatum. A spontaneous celebration in the streets of Warsaw turned into antisemitic rioting in which 2 people were killed and the windows of many Jewish shops were smashed.
- Born: Joe Kapp, CFL and NFL quarterback, in Santa Fe, New Mexico (d. 2023)

== March 20, 1938 (Sunday) ==
- Thousands of demonstrators marched in London to protest the Bombing of Barcelona and the Chamberlain government's refusal to allow arms to the Republicans.
- 61 American bishops of the Episcopal and Methodist churches publicized an open letter to the Catholic clergy of the United States, asking them to "bring the might of your influence to bear on Gen. Francisco Franco to halt bombing of civilians in Spain."

== March 21, 1938 (Monday) ==
- The Swiss Federal Assembly approved a government declaration that any violation of Swiss neutrality would be opposed by "an unshakeable, unanimous determination to defend independence to the last drop of blood."
- Born: Fritz Pleitgen, television journalist and author, in Duisburg–Meiderich, Germany (d. 2022)
- Died: Oscar Apfel, 60, American actor and filmmaker

== March 22, 1938 (Tuesday) ==
- The Farmers' League was compelled by the Nazis to withdraw its representative from the Czechoslovak cabinet and place itself under the direction of the Sudeten German Party.
- The World Jewish Congress petitioned the League of Nations to save Austria's Jews.
- 20th Century Fox's lawsuit against the magazine Night and Day for editor Graham Greene's infamous review of the Shirley Temple movie Wee Willie Winkie went to trial in Britain (Greene was in Mexico and not present). The judge awarded £3,500 in punitive damages and essentially put the magazine out of business.

== March 23, 1938 (Wednesday) ==
- Neville Chamberlain called upon the Trades Union Congress and asked for their help in speeding up Britain's arms production. Plans included the introduction of day and night shifts in munitions factories and hiring an additional 100,000 semi-skilled workers.
- Born: Maynard Jackson, politician, in Dallas, Texas (d. 2003)
- Died: Thomas Walter Scott, 70, first Premier of the Canadian province of Saskatchewan

== March 24, 1938 (Thursday) ==
- The Battle of Xuzhou and the Battle of Taierzhuang began.
- Neville Chamberlain made an important foreign policy speech in the House of Commons, saying Britain would fight for France and Belgium if they were attacked but making no such guarantee for Czechoslovakia.
- Vladas Mironas became Prime Minister of Lithuania.

== March 25, 1938 (Friday) ==
- The Nationalists launched the Levante Offensive.
- Battleship won the Grand National horse race.
- Born: Hoyt Axton, folk musician, songwriter and actor, in Duncan, Oklahoma (d. 1999)

== March 26, 1938 (Saturday) ==
- The Japanese government passed the National Mobilization Bill, giving the state dictatorial powers over the economy.
- The United Australia Party won the New South Wales state election.
- Born: Anthony James Leggett, physicist and Nobel laureate, in Camberwell, England (d. 2026)

== March 27, 1938 (Sunday) ==
- Nationalist forces pushed into Catalonia, capturing the village of Massalcoreig.
- Catholic churches in Austria read a pastoral letter calling for a vote of yes in the April 10 Anschluss referendum.
- A double referendum on constitutional reform was held in Uruguay. Voters approved both reform proposals.

== March 28, 1938 (Monday) ==
- In order to bring the flood of refugees from Austria under control, the Swiss Federal Council required holders of Austrian passports to have visas.
- Adolf Hitler met with Sudeten German leader Konrad Henlein and instructed him to create a crisis in Czechoslovakia by making demands that would be impossible to meet.
- The U.S. Supreme Court decided Lovell v. City of Griffin and New Negro Alliance v. Sanitary Grocery Co.
- Died: Džemaludin Čaušević, 67, Bosniak reformer and imam

== March 29, 1938 (Tuesday) ==
- A Dornier Do 18 flown by a crew of four Germans established a new seaplane distance record, flying 5,220 miles non-stop from Start Point, Devon, England to Caravelas, Brazil in 43 hours.
- Died: Alex Leake, 66, English footballer

== March 30, 1938 (Wednesday) ==
- The U.S. government demanded that Mexico pay fair compensation for the losses of American oil companies after the Mexican government took over their property.
- Benito Mussolini gave a senate speech broadcast around the world warning that "Italy's land, sea and air forces are tuned for rapid and implacable war."

== March 31, 1938 (Thursday) ==
- The Barbados Labour Party was founded.
- Born: Joel Godard, television announcer, in Milledgeville, Georgia
