= 1938 Gordon state by-election =

By-election in New South Wales, Australia

A by-election was held for the New South Wales Legislative Assembly electorate of Gordon on 24 September 1938 because the Court of Disputed Returns overturned the result of the 1938 Gordon election. Harry Turner had been declared elected by 9 votes over William Milne. Both candidates were endorsed by the United Australia Party. Milne filed a petition which challenged postal and absentee votes. Justice Maxwell sitting as the Court of Disputed Returns held that most of the 125 challenged votes did not meet the requirement of the Electoral Act such as not being properly witnessed, and that the election was void.

== Dates ==
Date	Event
26 March 1938	1938 Gordon election
18 May 1938	Petition lodged by William Milne.
25 August 1938	Justice Maxwell declared the 1938 Gordon election to be void.
2 September 1938	Writ of election issued by the Speaker of the Legislative Assembly.
9 September 1938	Nominations
24 September 1938	Polling day
6 October 1938	Return of writ

== Result ==
1938 Gordon by-election Saturday 24 September
Party	Candidate	Votes	%	±%
United Australia	Harry Turner (re-elected)	12,421	59.97	
United Australia	William Milne	8,291	40.03	
Total formal votes		20,712	97.96	
Informal votes		431	2.04	
Turnout		21,143	91.99	
United Australia hold		Swing		

== See also ==
- Electoral results for the district of Gordon
- List of New South Wales state by-elections
