= January 1938 =

Month of 1938

<<	January 1938					>>
Su	Mo	Tu	We	Th	Fr	Sa
						1
2	3	4	5	6	7	8
9	10	11	12	13	14	15
16	17	18	19	20	21	22
23	24	25	26	27	28	29
30	31

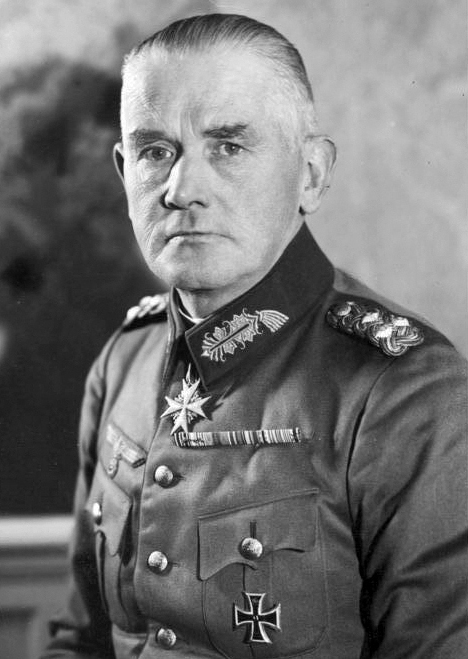
January 27, 1938: German War Minister Werner von Blomberg forced to resign by Adolf Hitler after scandal.

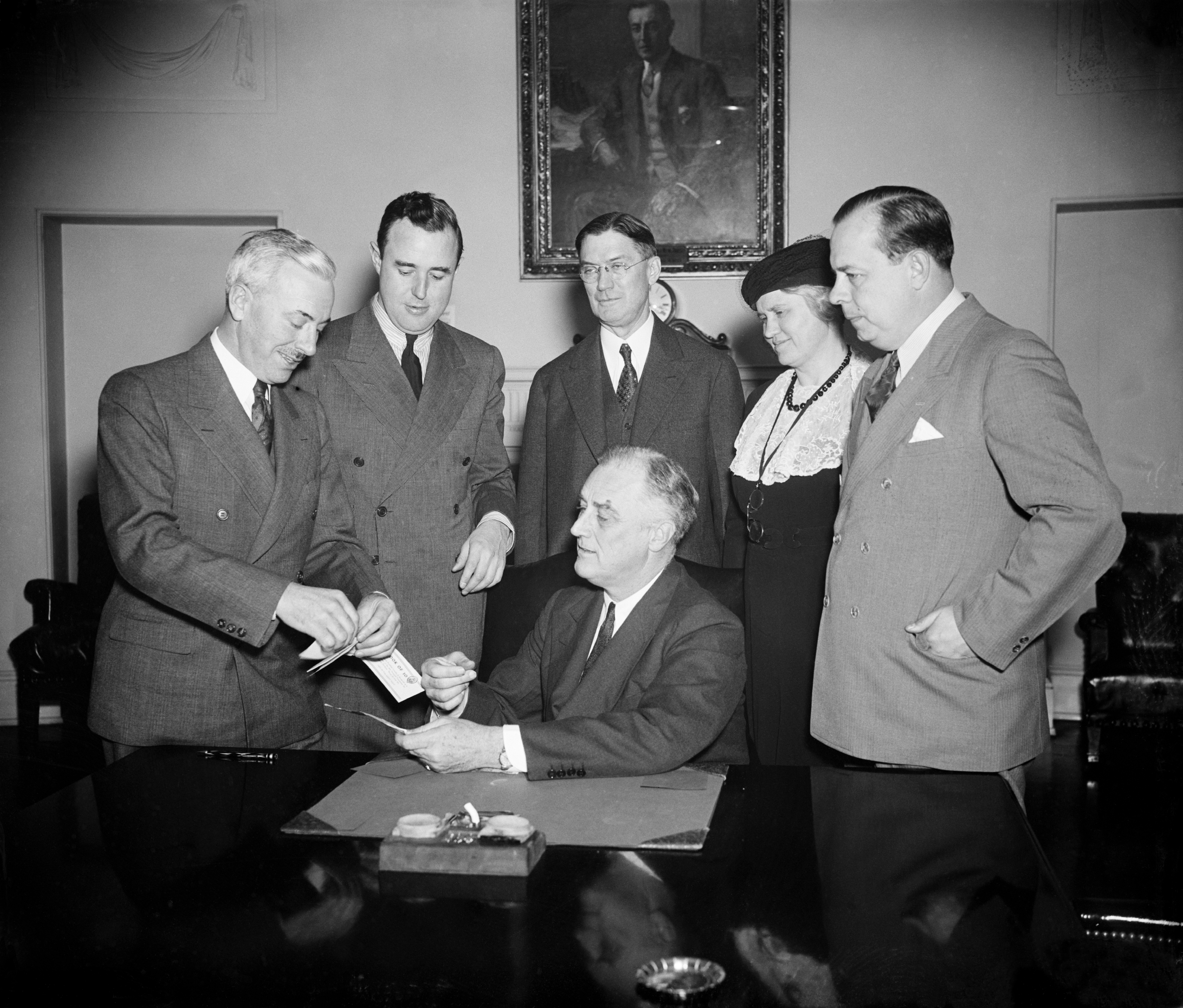
January 3, 1938: U.S. President Franklin D. Roosevelt co-founds the National Foundation for Infantile Paralysis and launches the March of Dimes campaign to find a cure for polio.

The following events occurred in January 1938:

== January 1, 1938 (Saturday) ==
- A new constitution went into effect in Estonia.
- According to Japanese government an official confirmed report, 69 persons died, 92 persons were hurt when a roof and wooden structure of Kugaiza Cinema collapsed, due to heavy snowfall in Tokamachi, Niigata Prefecture, Japan.
- George VI gave out six peerages in the New Year Honours list. Gracie Fields and Harriet Cohen were both bestowed the honor of Commander of the Order of the British Empire.
- Fukuin Electronics Manufacturing, later to become Pioneer Corporation, a Japanese electronics company that would become known for its superior audio equipment and its 1990 introduction of the first automotive navigation system, was founded in Tokyo.
- The second-ranked California Golden Bears defeated the fourth-ranked Alabama Crimson Tide, 13-0, in the Rose Bowl. The University of Pittsburgh Panthers, which had been selected by the Associated Press poll of sportswriters as the number one college football team in the U.S. at the end of the 1937 season, had turned down an invitation to play in the Rose Bowl. At the time, no poll was taken after the regular season. On the same day, the #8 Santa Clara Broncos outscored the #9 LSU Tigers, 6-0, in the Sugar Bowl, and the #18 Rice Owls defeated the #17 Colorado Buffaloes, 28-14, to win the Cotton Bowl Classic. The Auburn Tigers and the Michigan State Spartans, both unranked, met in the Orange Bowl and Auburn won, 6 to 0.
- Born: Robert Jankel, British coach builder, in London, England (d. 2005); Frank Langella, actor, in Bayonne, New Jersey
- Died: Alice Bailly, 65, Swiss painter

== January 2, 1938 (Sunday) ==
- Chinese officials in Canton threatened to carry out a scorched earth policy before surrendering the city to the Japanese.
- Born: David Bailey, fashion and portrait photographer, in Leytonstone, England; Farouk El-Baz, Egyptian-born American space scientist, in Mansoura; Hans Herbjørnsrud, author, in Heddal Municipality, Norway (d. 2023); Goh Kun, politician, in Keijo, Korea; Dana Ulery, computer scientist, in East St. Louis, Illinois
- Died: Henry Victor Deligny, 82, French general

== January 3, 1938 (Monday) ==
- The BBC made its first non-English broadcast, in Arabic. Listeners throughout the Middle East tuned in to a one-hour broadcast mostly consisting of a news bulletin on regional events. The audience reportedly expressed disappointment that the broadcast was not interspersed with love songs like Italy's programming was.
- Egyptian Prime Minister Muhammad Mahmoud Pasha prorogued the fractious parliament for one month. As the President of the Chamber read King Farouk's message of prorogation, the parliamentary deputies held a closed-door session in which they passed a motion of no-confidence against the government, 180-17. However, the government considered the motion illegal and ignored it.

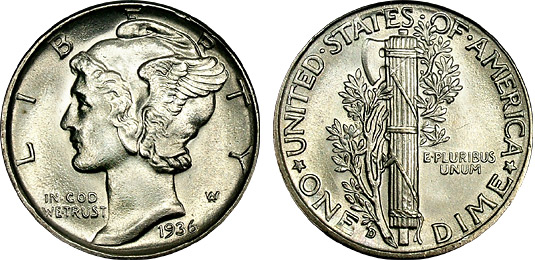
The March of Dimes

- U.S. President Franklin D. Roosevelt delivered the annual State of the Union address to Congress. Acknowledging that the world was in a state of "high tension and disorder," the president stated that "we must keep ourselves adequately strong in self-defense." Roosevelt also called for legislation to "end starvation wages and intolerable hours" as "an essential part of economic recovery."
- The musical play The Cradle Will Rock written by Marc Blitzstein and directed by Orson Welles made its Broadway debut at the Windsor Theatre.
- The March of Dimes was founded.

== January 4, 1938 (Tuesday) ==
- The British government postponed the Peel Commission and appointed the new Woodhead Commission to investigate the proposed partition of Mandatory Palestine.
- All Jews in Romania were banned from employing women under the age of 40.

== January 5, 1938 (Wednesday) ==
- Japanese warplanes bombed Hankou.
- Nazi Germany forbade Jews from changing their names to hide their ancestry.
- Born: King Juan Carlos I of Spain, in Rome, Italy

== January 6, 1938 (Thursday) ==
- The Octavian Goga government in Romania recognized the Italian conquest of Ethiopia.
- The drama film In Old Chicago starring Tyrone Power, Alice Faye and Don Ameche was released.
- Born: Mario Rodríguez Cobos, writer, in Mendoza, Argentina (d. 2010); Larisa Shepitko, filmmaker, in Artemovsk, Ukrainian SSR (d. 1979)
- Died: John Gavin, 62 or 63, Australian film director

== January 7, 1938 (Friday) ==
- Italy announced a massive new naval construction program. Two battleships were to be constructed by 1941.
- Born: Roland Topor, illustrator, writer and actor, in Paris, France (d. 1997)

== January 8, 1938 (Saturday) ==
- The United States House Committee on Ways and Means disclosed the salaries of all persons who made more than $15,000 in 1936. Alfred P. Sloan of General Motors was revealed to be the highest-paid CEO in the country, making $561,311. Gary Cooper was the highest-paid actor in Hollywood, making $370,214. Claudette Colbert was the top actress at $350,833.
- Born: Bob Eubanks, television and radio personality and game show host, in Flint, Michigan; Vasyl Stus, poet and publicist, in Rakhnivka, Vinnytsia Oblast, Ukrainian SSR (d. 1985)
- Died: Johnny Gruelle, 57, American artist, children's book author and creator of Raggedy Ann and Andy

== January 9, 1938 (Sunday) ==
- Battle of Teruel: The Republicans completed the capture of Teruel.
- Crown Prince Paul of Greece married Frederica of Hanover.

== January 10, 1938 (Monday) ==
- The Japanese captured the strategic port of Qingdao.
- Born: Donald Knuth, computer scientist and mathematician, in Milwaukee, Wisconsin; Frank Mahovlich, ice hockey player, in Timmins, Ontario, Canada; Willie McCovey, baseball player, in Mobile, Alabama (d. 2018)
- Died: Ivan Kleymyonov, 39, Russian scientist (killed in the Great Purge)

== January 11, 1938 (Tuesday) ==
- The Dutch freighter Hannah was torpedoed and sunk by an unidentified submarine seven miles off Cape San Antonio, Spain. All crew were saved.
- Japan held a conference in Tokyo in the presence of Emperor Hirohito. A harsh ultimatum was prepared for China, including payment of reparations and formalization of the separation of northern Chinese territory under Japanese control.
- Adolf Hitler received the newly appointed Japanese Ambassador to Germany Shigenori Tōgō.
- Born: Fischer Black, economist, in Washington, D.C. (d. 1995); Alastair Morton, railway executive, in Johannesburg, South Africa (d. 2004)

== January 12, 1938 (Wednesday) ==
- The Supreme Soviet of the Soviet Union opened for the first time.
- German War Minister Werner von Blomberg married his secretary Erna Gruhn at the War Ministry building in Berlin. Adolf Hitler and Hermann Göring served as witnesses.
- Austria and Hungary recognized Francoist Spain.
- Born: Teresa del Conde, art critic, in Mexico City, Mexico (d. 2017); Lewis Fiander, actor, in Melbourne, Australia (d. 2016); Noel McNamara, justice campaigner, in Australia (d. 2025)

== January 13, 1938 (Thursday) ==
- A snap election was called in Northern Ireland to be held February 9. Prime Minister Lord Craigavon called the election so his government would be in a strong position to contend an expected attempt by Éamon de Valera to apply the new Irish Constitution to Ulster.
- Born: Paavo Heininen, composer and pianist, in Järvenpää, Finland (d. 2022); Nachi Nozawa, actor and theatre director, in Tokyo, Japan (d. 2010); Shivkumar Sharma, Santoor player, in Jammu, British India (d. 2022)

== January 14, 1938 (Friday) ==
- Norway laid claim to part of the Antarctic including Peter I Island.
- Camille Chautemps resigned as Prime Minister of France when the Socialists withdrew their support.
- Born: Jack Jones, jazz and pop singer, in Hollywood (d. 2024); Allen Toussaint, musician and record producer, in Gert Town, New Orleans (d. 2015)
- Died: Jaakko Mäki, Finnish politician (b. 1878)

== January 15, 1938 (Saturday) ==
- The Supreme Soviet of the Soviet Union announced an expanded naval program and passed a war emergency measure allowing the Presidium to proclaim martial law or a state of war.
- Died: Harold R. Atteridge, 51, American composer, librettist and lyricist; Paul Raphael Montford, 69, English sculptor

== January 16, 1938 (Sunday) ==
- While the Chinese government was still considering how to respond to the Japanese ultimatum, Japan announced it was ending diplomatic relations with China. In Japanese, this was known as the aite ni sezu ("absolutely no dealing") declaration.
- In the U.S., the Benny Goodman Orchestra became the first jazz music band to perform at Carnegie Hall in New York City, which had hitherto been reserved for classical music concerts from symphony orchestras. The live recording of the session would be released in 1950 under the title The Famous 1938 Carnegie Hall Jazz Concert.

== January 17, 1938 (Monday) ==
- The Exposition Internationale du Surréalisme opened in Paris.
- Born: John Bellairs, fantasy novelist, in Marshall, Michigan (d. 1991)

== January 18, 1938 (Tuesday) ==
- 47 perished in a fire at the College of the Sacred Heart in Saint-Hyacinthe, Quebec, Canada.
- Camille Chautemps returned as French Prime Minister with the formation of a new cabinet.
- Grover Cleveland Alexander was elected to the Baseball Hall of Fame.
- Born: Curt Flood, baseball player, in Houston, Texas (d. 1997)

== January 19, 1938 (Wednesday) ==
- German bombers of the Condor Legion killed more than 100 people in an air raid on Barcelona.
- Died: Branislav Nušić, 73, Serbian writer

== January 20, 1938 (Thursday) ==
- King Farouk of Egypt married his first wife Farida in Cairo.
- Born: Derek Dougan, footballer, in Belfast, Northern Ireland (d. 2007)
- Died: Émile Cohl, 81, French caricaturist and animator

== January 21, 1938 (Friday) ==
- A law was passed in Romania that stripped 270,000 Jews of their citizenship.
- Acting on a tipoff from MI5 agent Olga Gray, British police arrested two men performing a handoff of documents in Charing Cross tube station. The documents had been stolen from Woolwich Arsenal.
- Born: Wolfman Jack, disc jockey, in Brooklyn, New York (d. 1995)
- Died: Georges Méliès, 76, French illusionist and filmmaker

== January 22, 1938 (Saturday) ==
- The three-act play Our Town by Thornton Wilder premiered at the McCarter Theatre in Princeton, New Jersey.

== January 23, 1938 (Sunday) ==
- The Honeymoon Bridge at Niagara Falls took severe structural damage from a deluge of ice during a wind storm.
- Born: Georg Baselitz, painter, in Deutschbaselitz, Germany (d. 2026); Giant Baba, professional wrestler, in Sanjō, Niigata, Japan (d. 1999)

== January 24, 1938 (Monday) ==
- The Jubilee Medal "XX Years of the Workers' and Peasants' Red Army" was established in the Soviet Union to commemorate the 20th anniversary of the Soviet Armed Forces.
- BBC Television broadcast the first televised opera, a production of Wagner's Tristan und Isolde.

== January 25, 1938 (Tuesday) ==
- Austrian police raided Nazi headquarters in Vienna and uncovered plans of a Nazi coup. Chancellor Kurt Schuschnigg refused to publish the documents because he feared they could antagonize Hitler.
- Hermann Göring presented Hitler with a file on Werner von Blomberg's new wife, revealing her police record as a former prostitute who had also posed for pornographic photos. Hitler confronted Blomberg the same day and informed him that he could not continue as War Minister.
- An intense display of the Aurora Borealis or Northern Lights was witnessed across Europe, as far south as Gibraltar and parts of the United States.
- Born: Etta James, singer, in Los Angeles (d. 2012); Shotaro Ishinomori, manga artist, in Tome, Miyagi, Japan (d. 1998); Vladimir Vysotsky, singer-songwriter, poet and actor, in Moscow, USSR (d. 1980); Leiji Matsumoto, manga artist, in Kurume, Fukuoka Prefecture, Japan (d. 2023)

== January 26, 1938 (Wednesday) ==
- Werner von Fritsch was summoned to the Chancellory to answer accusations of homosexuality, which he denied.
- Two truckloads of hand grenades confiscated from La Cagoule exploded in the Parisian suburb of Villejuif, killing 14.
- Australia Day: Australia celebrated the 150th anniversary of the arrival of the First Fleet.

== January 27, 1938 (Thursday) ==
- Werner von Blomberg resigned his post "for reasons of health" and returned to his honeymoon in Capri, Italy. Hitler had promised to return von Blomberg to his post once the controversy passed, but he was never recalled for duty.
- The Honeymoon Bridge collapsed.

== January 28, 1938 (Friday) ==
- 15 people, including three army officers, were arrested in Greece for plotting to assassinate Ioannis Metaxas.
- Experiencing great personal duress from the Blomberg–Fritsch Affair, Hitler cancelled plans to hold a special session of the Reichstag on Sunday to celebrate the fifth anniversary of coming to power. The official reason given was that the international situation made it an inopportune time to make any foreign policy statements.
- Born: Nabih Berri, Lebanese politician, in Bo, Sierra Leone
- Died: Bernd Rosemeyer, 28, German racing driver (auto accident during a land speed record attempt)

== January 29, 1938 (Saturday) ==
- British police made two more arrests in the Woolwich Arsenal spy case. Both suspects worked in the Arsenal and had connections to the Communist Party of Great Britain. One of them was found to be in possession of a suitcase with a double bottom used for smuggling blueprints.
- German chemist Paul Schlack synthesized Nylon 6, widely known by its tradename Perlon.
- Born: Shuji Tsurumi, gymnast, in Tokyo, Japan
- Died: Armando Palacio Valdés, 84, Spanish novelist and critic

== January 30, 1938 (Sunday) ==
- With the German public mostly oblivious to the Blomberg–Fritsch Affair except for rumors, celebrations were held around the country marking the fifth anniversary of the Nazi regime.
- The Employee and Worker Faithful Service Medal was founded in Nazi Germany.
- The German National Prize for Art and Science was awarded to its first five recipients.
- Born:
  - Norma Jean, country singer, in Wellston, Oklahoma
  - Islam Karimov, first President of Uzbekistan, in Samarkand (d. 2016)

== January 31, 1938 (Monday) ==
- Hermann Göring ordered the creation of a "council of war economics" with its members appointed by the Minister of War and commanders-in-chief of the military.
- The U.S. Supreme Court decided Connecticut General Life Insurance Co. v. Johnson.
- Born: Beatrix of the Netherlands, in Soestdijk Palace, Baarn; Lynn Carlin, actress, in Los Angeles, California
