= 1938 Azerbaijani Supreme Soviet election =

Supreme Soviet elections were held in the Azerbaijan SSR on 24 June 1938 as part of the wider Soviet regional elections. Of the 310 directly elected members of the Supreme Soviet, 115 were from the intelligentsia or were public servants, while 88 were farmers. 72 of the elected members were women.
