= February 1938 =

Month of 1938

| << | February 1938 | | | | | >> |
| Su | Mo | Tu | We | Th | Fr | Sa |
| | | 1 | 2 | 3 | 4 | 5 |
| 6 | 7 | 8 | 9 | 10 | 11 | 12 |
| 13 | 14 | 15 | 16 | 17 | 18 | 19 |
| 20 | 21 | 22 | 23 | 24 | 25 | 26 |
| 27 | 28 |

The following events occurred in February 1938:

== February 1, 1938 (Tuesday) ==
- The Shanghai Expeditionary Army was disbanded.
- Benito Mussolini had Italian soldiers adopt the goose step, or as he christened it, the "passo romano", or "Roman step". King Victor Emmanuel III had opposed the decision, but Mussolini could not be swayed, calling the goose a "Roman animal".
- The Banda Sea earthquake occurred.
- Born: Jimmy Carl Black, drummer and vocalist for The Mothers of Invention, in El Paso, Texas (d. 2008); Sherman Hemsley, actor, in Philadelphia, Pennsylvania (d. 2012)
- Died: Charles D'Arcy, 79, Archbishop of Armagh (Church of Ireland)

== February 2, 1938 (Wednesday) ==
- King Farouk of Egypt dissolved Parliament and ordered new elections for April.
- Born: Max Alvis, baseball player, in Jasper, Texas
- Died: Fairfax Harrison, 68, American lawyer, businessman and writer

== February 3, 1938 (Thursday) ==
- Adolf Hitler asked Werner von Fritsch to submit his resignation.
- The comedy duo of Abbott and Costello made their radio debut on The Kate Smith Hour.
- The radio series Challenge of the Yukon premiered on WXYT in Detroit.

== February 4, 1938 (Friday) ==
- The Oberkommando der Wehrmacht was established in Nazi Germany by decree, putting Hitler himself in complete control of the military with Wilhelm Keitel as nominal commander-in-chief. The new command structure abolished the position of War Minister, and twelve senior generals were sent into retirement. The German public was still unaware of the Blomberg–Fritsch Affair and wondered if the changes were the result of some kind of failed internal coup attempt.
- Joachim von Ribbentrop became Reich Minister for Foreign Affairs.

== February 5, 1938 (Saturday) ==
- The Battle of Alfambra began.
- Walther Funk was made the new Reich Minister of Economics in Germany.
- The Hitler Cabinet met for the final time.
- Jews were banned from working as auctioneers in Nazi Germany.
- A Soviet plane crashed into a mountain in Kandalaksha on a trial flight preparing to rescue Russian scientists on an ice floe in Greenland. 13 of the 19 aboard were killed.
- The 3rd British Empire Games opened in Sydney, Australia.
- The 4th Central American and Caribbean Games opened in Panama City.
- Megan Taylor of the United Kingdom won the ladies' competition at the World Figure Skating Championships in Stockholm.
- Born: John Guare, playwright, in New York City
- Died: Hans Litten, 34, German lawyer (committed suicide in Dachau concentration camp)

== February 6, 1938 (Sunday) ==
- Black Sunday: Hundreds of swimmers were dragged out to sea by freak waves at Bondi Beach in Sydney, Australia. Lifesavers were able to rescue all but five.
- Died: Marianne von Werefkin, 77, Russian-Swiss Expressionist painter

== February 7, 1938 (Monday) ==
- The trial of Martin Niemöller opened in Germany.
- Died: Harvey Samuel Firestone, 69, American businessman and founder of the Firestone Tire and Rubber Company

== February 8, 1938 (Tuesday) ==
- The Battle of Alfambra ended in Nationalist victory.
- Born: Prentice Gautt, NFL running back, in Oklahoma City, Oklahoma (d. 2005)
- Died: Prince Nicholas of Greece and Denmark, 66

== February 9, 1938 (Wednesday) ==
- A general election was held in Northern Ireland. The Ulster Unionist Party won another majority.
- The Japanese captured Bengbu.

== February 10, 1938 (Thursday) ==
- Carol II of Romania staged a self-coup and seized emergency powers, forcing Octavian Goga out of office.
- Died: Richard A. Whiting, 46, American composer and songwriter

== February 11, 1938 (Friday) ==
- Patriarch Miron Cristea became the new Prime Minister of Romania.
- Steve Casey defeated Lou Thesz to win the National Wrestling Association World Heavyweight Championship.
- Born: Bevan Congdon, cricketer, in Motueka, New Zealand (d. 2018); Simone de Oliveira, singer and actress, in Lisbon, Portugal; Bobby Pickett, singer, in Somerville, Massachusetts (d. 2007)
- Died: Kazimierz Twardowski, 71, Polish philosopher and logician

== February 12, 1938 (Saturday) ==
- Austrian Chancellor Kurt Schuschnigg went to see Hitler in Berchtesgaden. Schuschnigg tried to open the meeting with light conversation about the beauty of the view, but Hitler brushed such talk aside and began a tirade of shouting, threatening to invade unless his demands compromising Austria's sovereignty were met.
- The British Empire Games closed in Sydney. Australia won the final medal count with 25 gold medals and 66 overall.
- Born: Judy Blume, novelist, in Elizabeth, New Jersey

== February 13, 1938 (Sunday) ==
- 16 women drowned when a ferry boat capsized in Sydney Harbour. The passengers, mostly women, had crowded on one side of the ferry hoping to get the attention of sailors aboard the Louisville.
- Born: Oliver Reed, actor, in Wimbledon, London, England (d. 1999)

== February 14, 1938 (Monday) ==
- Britain formally dedicated the Singapore Naval Base, the largest of its kind in the world.
- Born: Lee Chamberlin, actress, in New York City (d. 2014)

== February 15, 1938 (Tuesday) ==
- Kurt Schuschnigg appointed two pro-Nazi members to his cabinet: Arthur Seyss-Inquart (Minister of the Interior) and Ludwig Adamovich (Minister of Justice).

== February 16, 1938 (Wednesday) ==
- Arturo Toscanini withdrew from the Salzburg Festival in protest of the Austrian government's deal with Germany.
- Italy gave its first indication of passing antisemitic laws in the future when an official policy statement was released announcing that Jews were not to "play a more important part in the national life than their individual abilities merit" or engage in activities "out of proportion to their numerical representation in the community."
- The Agricultural Adjustment Act went into effect in the United States.
- The screwball comedy film Bringing Up Baby starring Katharine Hepburn and Cary Grant premiered in San Francisco, California.
- Born: John Corigliano, composer, in New York City

== February 17, 1938 (Thursday) ==
- A tornado swept through Rodessa, Louisiana, killing 20 people.
- John Logie Baird demonstrated a prototype colour television in London.
- The film The Adventures of Tom Sawyer starring Tommy Kelly premiered at Radio City Music Hall in New York.
- Born: Yvonne Romain, actress, in London, England

== February 18, 1938 (Friday) ==
- The Japanese began the Bombing of Chongqing.
- Born: István Szabó, filmmaker, in Budapest, Hungary
- Died: David King Udall, 86, American politician

== February 19, 1938 (Saturday) ==
- Bruno Walter conducted the Vienna Philharmonic for what would be the last time.
- Felix Kaspar of Austria won the men's competition at the World Figure Skating Championships in Berlin.
- Born: René Muñoz, actor and screenwriter, in Havana, Cuba (d. 2000)
- Died: Edmund Landau, 61, German mathematician

== February 20, 1938 (Sunday) ==
- Hitler gave a three-hour internationally broadcast speech in the Reichstag vowing to protect German minorities outside of the Reich and reiterating demands for restoration of German colonies.
- Died: Ciro Terranova, 49, Sicilian-born American gangster

== February 21, 1938 (Monday) ==
- The Spanish Republicans, virtually surrounded in Teruel, withdrew.
- Anthony Eden resigned as Foreign Secretary of the United Kingdom, telling Prime Minister Neville Chamberlain: "I have become increasingly conscious of differences between us." Lord Halifax became the new Foreign Secretary.

== February 22, 1938 (Tuesday) ==
- The Battle of Teruel ended in a Nationalist victory with recapture of the city, a turning point in the Spanish Civil War.
- By a vote of 330–168, Neville Chamberlain's appeasement policy was endorsed by the House of Commons when it rejected a Labour motion to censure Chamberlain for dismissing Anthony Eden as Foreign Secretary. Winston Churchill was among about 20 Conservatives who abstained from voting.

== February 23, 1938 (Wednesday) ==
- The Labour Party issued a manifesto demanding that Prime Minister Neville Chamberlain call a new general election to assess whether the public supported his appeasement policy. "This is not the time for concessions to dictators", the manifesto read. "The government holds no mandate from electors for the vital change it has made in foreign policy. We demand that a stand shall be taken with other peace loving nations against the violence and threats of Fascist powers."
- Joe Louis knocked out Nathan Mann in the third round at Madison Square Garden to retain the world heavyweight boxing title.

== February 24, 1938 (Thursday) ==
- Kurt Schuschnigg made a defiant speech to the Austrian Diet appealing to the country to fight to maintain its independence, declaring "Rotweissrot bis in den Tod" ("Red-white-red until we are dead.")
- A constitutional referendum was held in Romania. 99.87% of voters approved the amendments, but the integrity of the voting process was highly questionable.
- The first nylon-based products went on sale in the United States: toothbrushes.
- The 4th Central American and Caribbean Games ended. Mexico won the medal count with 24 gold medals and 72 total.
- Born: James Farentino, actor, in Brooklyn, New York (d. 2012); Phil Knight, co-founder of Nike, Inc., in Portland, Oregon
- Died: Gustave Le Rouge, 70, French author

== February 25, 1938 (Friday) ==
- Two days of parliamentary elections concluded in Estonia. The National Front for the Implementation of the Constitution won 64 of 80 seats.
- Born: Herb Elliott, runner, in Subiaco, Western Australia

== February 26, 1938 (Saturday) ==
- The French Chamber of Deputies by a vote of 439-2 endorsed the government's policy of joining Britain in entering negotiations with Germany and Italy.
- The Nazi prosecutor in Martin Niemöller's trial demanded that the pastor be sentenced to 20 months in prison.
- Died: Ilyas Zhansugurov, 43, Kazakh poet and writer (killed in the Great Purge)

== February 27, 1938 (Sunday) ==
- The 1938 Constitution of Romania was ratified.
- 10,000 demonstrators marched on the Italian embassy in London protesting the Chamberlain government's appeasement policy.
- The Los Angeles flood of 1938 began.
- Born: Jake Thackray, singer-songwriter, poet and journalist, in Kirkstall, Leeds, England (d. 2002)

== February 28, 1938 (Monday) ==
- Oberkommando der Wehrmacht chief Wilhelm Keitel ordered all retired military officers to be placed "at the disposal" of the military regardless of age. Officers discharged under dishonorable circumstances as well as Jews and those married to Jews were excluded.
