= 1938 Nicaraguan Constitutional Assembly election =

Constitutional Assembly elections were held in Nicaragua on 6 November 1938.

The elections held on 6 November 1938 were even more of a sham than those that named Anastasio Somoza García president in 1936. The Conservatives decided to abstain again, while the ballot boxes and ballots were distributed throughout the country by the quartermaster general of the Guardia Nacional. The final results were made available within twenty-four hours. In 1938 the Genuino Conservatives decided to field candidates for the Constituent Assembly although the Conservative party’s leadership vehemently opposed the plan.

== Results ==
Party	Seats
Nationalist Liberal Party	37
Conservative Nationalist Party	12
Traditional Conservative Party	8
Total	57
Source: Political Handbook of the World

== Aftermath ==
The Assembly adopted the new constitution in March 1939, after which it was transformed into a regular Congress, with a 42-seat Chamber of Deputies and a Senate with 15 elected members and all living ex-presidents. The Nationalist Liberal Party's 37 elected members became 26 deputies and 11 senators, The Conservative Nationalist Party had nine deputies and three senators, while the Traditional Conservative Party had seven deputies and one senator. Ex-Presidents were also entitled to sit in the Senate, with José María Moncada Tapia doing so on behalf of the Nationalist Liberal Party.

In March 1939 the new Congress elected Anastasio Somoza García as president for 1939–1947 and remained as the country's legislature until May 1947.

== Bibliography ==
- Alexander, Robert J. Communism in Latin America. New Brunswick: Rutgers University Press. 1957.
- Elections in the Americas A Data Handbook Volume 1. North America, Central America, and the Caribbean. Edited by Dieter Nohlen. 2005.
- Leonard, Thomas M. The United States and Central America, 1944–1949. Tuscaloosa: The University of Alabama Press. 1984.
- MacRenato, Ternot. 1991. Somoza: seizure of power, 1926–1939. La Jolla: University of California, San Diego.
- Merrill, Tim L., ed. Nicaragua : a country study. Washington: Federal Research Division, Library of Congress. 1994.
- Political handbook of the world 1944. New York, 1945.
- Rojas Bolaños, Manuel. “La política.” Historia general de Centroamérica. 1994. San José: FLACSO. Volume five, 1994.
- Smith, Hazel. Nicaragua: self-determination and survival. London : Pluto Press. 1993.
- Walter, Knut. The regime of Anastasio Somoza, 1936–1956. Chapel Hill: The University of North Carolina. 1993.
