= Kevin Harrold =

Australian politician (1929–2012)

Kevin Joseph Harrold (13 June 1929 – 28 September 2012) was an Australian politician. He was the member for Gordon in the New South Wales Legislative Assembly from 1973 to 1976, and was the only member of the Democratic Labor Party to win election to the New South Wales Parliament.

Harrold was born in Bowral, and was educated there at St Thomas Aquinas School before attending Sydney Technical College. In 1960, he became an electrical contractor. He married Mary on 11 April 1955.

In 1973, the Liberal member for the safe seat of Gordon, Harry Jago, failed to renominate in time, and the seat was left as a contest between Labor candidate Miron Shapira and Harrold, endorsed by the DLP. When the Liberal Party directed its supporters to vote for Harrold, he won the seat easily. By the time of the 1976 election, the DLP had virtually ceased to exist, but the label was retained for Harrold, who was comprehensively defeated by new Liberal candidate Tim Moore.

In parliament, Harrold twice introduced bills to restrict abortion rights in New South Wales. His Infant Life Preservation Bill, introduced in March 1976, provided for jail sentences of up to twenty years for doctors performing abortions after the 19th week of pregnancy, with jail sentences of up to ten years for performing an abortion without approval from two medical practitioners, and two years for carrying out abortions in unauthorised premises or failing to notify authorities that an abortion had taken place. Harrold accused doctors of engaging in racketeering and claimed some had become millionaires through carrying out abortions on demand.

Harrold died in September 2012 at the age of 83.

New South Wales Legislative Assembly
| Preceded by Harry Jago | Member for Gordon; 1973–1976 | Succeeded by Tim Moore |
