= 1938 Wisconsin lieutenant gubernatorial election =

- November 8, 1938
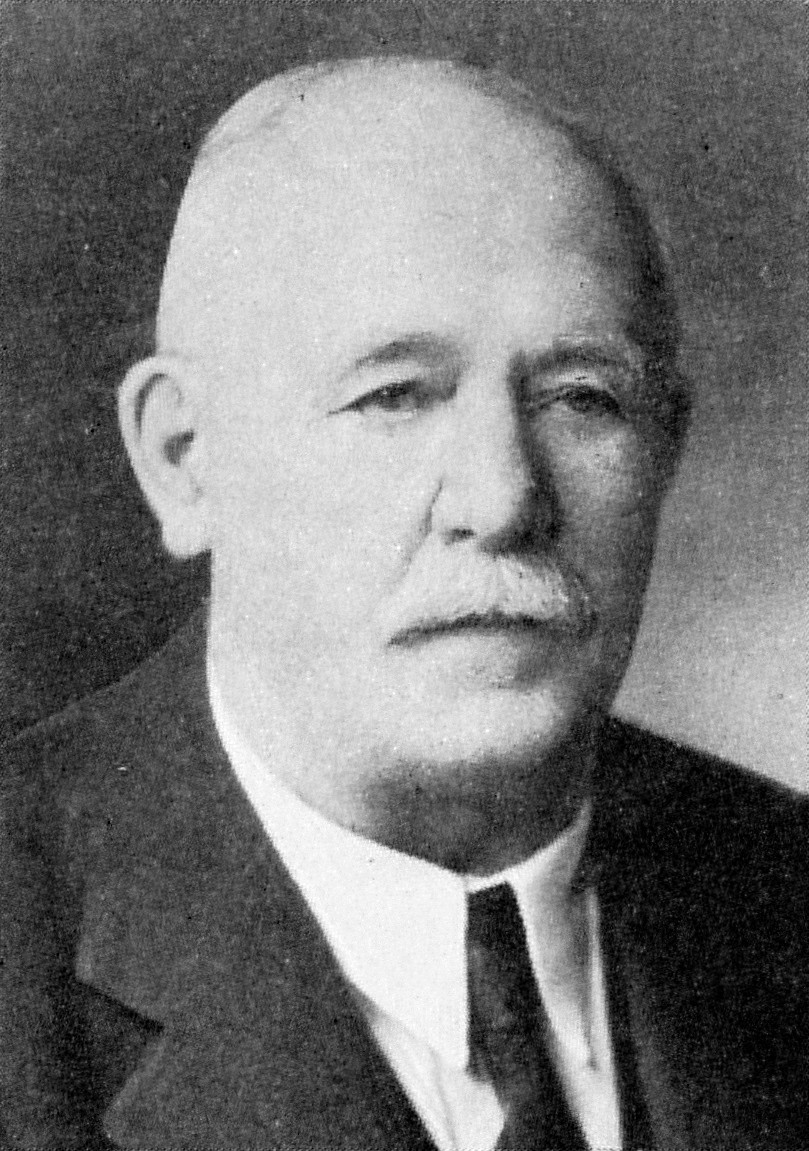

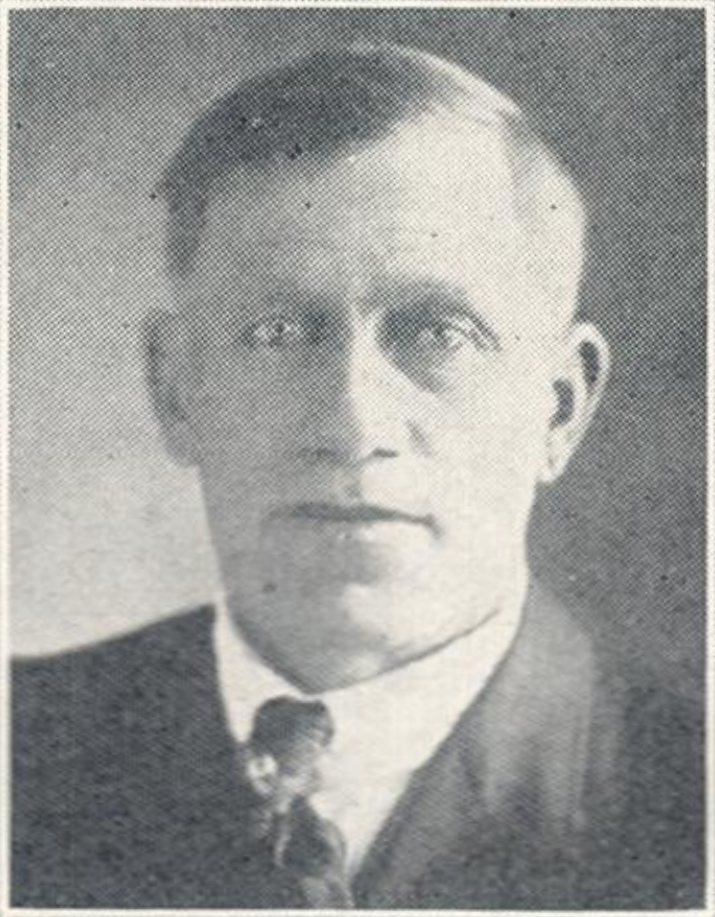

| Nominee | Walter Samuel Goodland | George A. Nelson | Max Galasinski |
| Party | Republican | Progressive | Democratic |
| Popular vote | 477,084 | 313,066 | 113,057 |
| Percentage | 52.37% | 34.36% | 12.41% |
Lieutenant Governor before election
Herman Ekern
Progressive
Elected Lieutenant Governor
Walter Samuel Goodland
Republican

The 1938 Wisconsin lieutenant gubernatorial election was held on November 8, 1938, in order to elect the lieutenant governor of Wisconsin. Republican nominee and former member of the Wisconsin Senate Walter Samuel Goodland defeated Progressive nominee and former Speaker of the Wisconsin State Assembly George A. Nelson, Democratic nominee and incumbent member of the Wisconsin Senate Max Galasinski and Union nominee Clement J. Lange.

== General election ==
On election day, November 8, 1938, Republican nominee Walter Samuel Goodland won the election by a margin of 164,018 votes against his foremost opponent Progressive nominee George A. Nelson, thereby gaining Republican control over the office of lieutenant governor. Goodland was sworn in as the 29th lieutenant governor of Wisconsin on January 2, 1939.

=== Results ===
Wisconsin lieutenant gubernatorial election, 1938
| Party | Candidate | Votes | % |
|---|---|---|---|
| Republican | Walter Samuel Goodland | 477,084 | 52.37 |
| Progressive | George A. Nelson | 313,066 | 34.36 |
| Democratic | Max Galasinski | 113,057 | 12.41 |
| Union | Clement J. Lange | 5,945 | 0.65 |
| | Scattering | 1,901 | 0.21 |
| Total votes | | 911,053 | 100.00 |
| Republican gain from Progressive | | | |
