= 1938 Soviet Union regional elections =

Legislative election in the Soviet Union

- June 1938

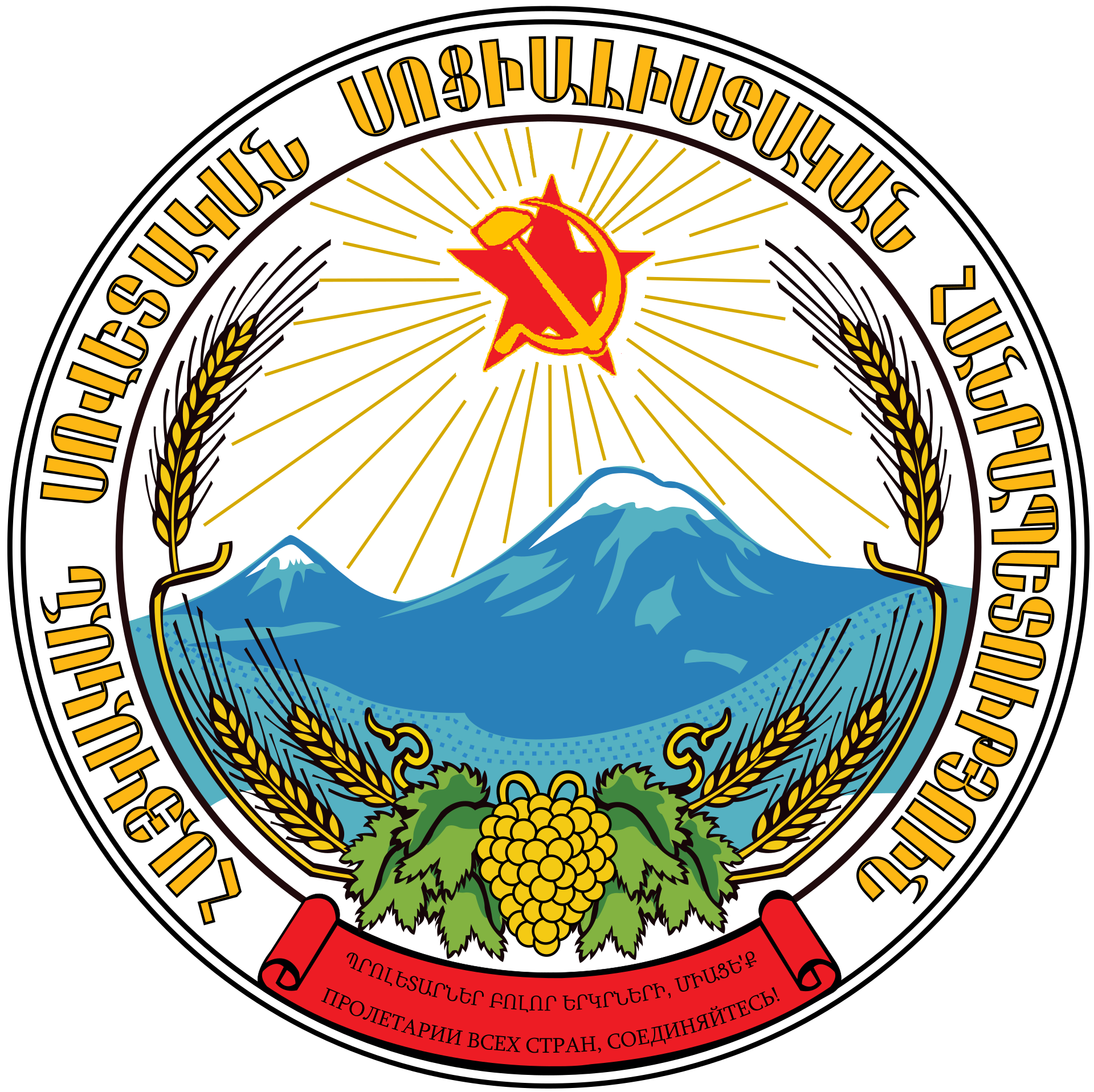

	First party	Second party	Third party
Leader	Mir Jafar Baghirov	Grigory Arutinov	Panteleimon Ponomarenko
Party	AzKP(b)	ArCP(b)	KPB(b)
Leader since	November 1933	23 September 1937	18 June 1938
Seats won	310 / 310	340 / 340	273 / 273
	Fourth party	Fifth party	Sixth party
Leader	Lavrentiy Beria	Nikolay Skvortsov	Aleksey Vagov
Party	CNG(b)	KPKaz(b)	KPK(b)
Leader since	15 January 1934	3 May 1938	1938
Seats won	237 / 237	300 / 300	284 / 284
	Seventh party	Eighth party
Leader	Nikolai Bulganin	Nikita Khrushchev
Party	VKP(b)	CPU(b)
Leader since	3 April 1922	27 January 1938
Seats won	568 / 727	222 / 304

In June 1938, elections took place in the Union of Soviet Socialist Republics (USSR) for the Supreme Soviets of its 11 constituent republics. These elections were held following the adoption of the 1936 Constitution of the Soviet Union, which established a division of government branches into the Executive Council of People's Commissars of the Soviet Union and Legislative Supreme Soviet of the Soviet Union. Consequently, the constitutions of the union republics were amended in 1937 to reflect this separation of powers, leading to the institutionalization of parliamentary structures. The elections were conducted for each of the Supreme Soviets of the USSR's constituent republics. According to Soviet law, approximately 5,100,000 individuals out of a total eligible adult voting population of 93,411,000 were disenfranchised due to various reasons. This marked the first instance of direct elections to these parliamentary bodies, signifying a significant shift in the political landscape of the USSR.

Certain individuals ran and were elected simultaneously in several union republics among which were Joseph Stalin, Kliment Voroshilov and others.

1938 Soviet Union regional elections
Union Republic	Election date	Election name	Results
AzSSR	24 June 1938	1938 Azerbaijani Supreme Soviet election	310 / 310
ArSSR		1938 Armenian Supreme Soviet election	340 / 340
BSSR		1938 Byelorussian Supreme Soviet election	273 / 273
GSSR	12 June 1938	1938 Georgian Supreme Soviet election	237 / 237
Kazakh SSR	24 June 1938	1938 Kazakh Supreme Soviet election	300 / 300
borderless Kirghiz SSR	24 June 1938	1938 Kirghiz Supreme Soviet election	284 / 284
RSFSR	26 June 1938	1938 Russian Supreme Soviet election	568 / 727
Tajik SSR		1938 Tajik Supreme Soviet election	Composition unknown
Turkmen SSR		1938 Turkmen Supreme Soviet election	Composition unknown
Uzbek SSR		1938 Uzbek Supreme Soviet election	Composition unknown
UkSSR	26 June 1938	1938 Ukrainian Supreme Soviet election	222 / 304

== See also ==
- 1938 Russian Supreme Soviet election
- 1938 Ukrainian Supreme Soviet election
