= Jeremy Kinross =

Australian politician (1959–2025)

- Kinross c.1992

Member of the New South Wales Legislative Assembly for Gordon
- In office 1992–1999
- Preceded by: Tim Moore
- Succeeded by: Seat Abolished

Personal details
- Born: 18 December 1959 Sydney, Australia
- Died: 19 July 2025 (aged 65) Phuket, Thailand
- Party: Liberal

Jeremy Stirton Prevost Kinross (18 December 1959 – 19 July 2025) was an Australian politician. He was the Liberal Party member for Gordon in the New South Wales Legislative Assembly from 1992 to 1999.

== Life and career ==
Kinross was born in Sydney on 18 December 1959, to John Stirton Kinross and his wife Elisabeth. He was educated at The King's School, Parramatta, before attending the University of New South Wales and Macquarie University, receiving a Bachelor of Laws (with Honours) and a Bachelor of Commerce and an MBA, becoming both a Barrister and Chartered Accountant. He was a fellow of the Taxation Institute of Australia and author of the taxation section for the Commercial Law Association. He joined the Liberal Party in 1986.

In 1992, the Liberal member for the local state seat of Gordon, Tim Moore, resigned over the findings of the Independent Commission Against Corruption, having been linked to the Metherell affair. Kinross was selected as the Liberal candidate to contest the by-election, which he won easily, (with an almost unprecedented swing against the Government of only 5%) as the Labor Party did not field a candidate. However, in a by-election in the neighbouring seat of Ku-ring-gai on that very same day (caused by the resignation of the then Premier Nick Greiner), the Liberal Party suffered a 19% swing taking, for the first time ever, the seat to preferences. Both these seats were 'jewels in the Crown' for the Liberal Party – and there appears no public analysis or record whatsoever as to the reason(s) for that huge difference. Kinross was re-elected in 1995, but in 1999 his seat was abolished. In the reshuffle of North Shore Liberal MPs, Kinross missed out on a seat, whilst Stephen O'Doherty in Ku-ring-gai was rewarded with the newly re-created seat of Hornsby (held by Liberal Minister for Mineral Resources and Energy, Neil Pickard until 1991). Kinross contested preselection for the Legislative Council, which is the upper house of the New South Wales parliament, but was unsuccessful. Much writing on the Liberal Party factions (especially in NSW) has attributed his downfall to them or, perhaps more accurately, to 'collateral damage' which also saw the chief factional powerbroker in NSW and deputy Liberal leader Ron Phillips, and his colleague Michael Photios, both defeated in that 1999 general election. The latter has been well documented in the Book "The Bear Pit" by former Leader of the Opposition in NSW, Peter Collins. Kinross subsequently retired.

Kinross died in a choking accident in Phuket, Thailand, on 19 July 2025, at the age of 65.

New South Wales Legislative Assembly
Preceded by Tim Moore	Member for Gordon; 1992–1999	Succeeded by Abolished
