= Stewart Fraser (politician) =

Australian politician

Personal details
- Born: 1 January 1895 Bunbury, Western Australia
- Died: 20 August 1965 (aged 70) Chatswood, New South Wales
- Party: Liberal Party

Donald Stewart Fraser (1895 – 20 August 1965) was an Australian politician and a member of the New South Wales Legislative Assembly from 1953 until 1962. He was a member of the Liberal Party.

Fraser was born in Bunbury, Western Australia and was educated to a secondary level. He worked initially as a journalist but after a period as a sales director for a car distributor in Sri Lanka, moved to Sydney and became a company director for several building societies and the Master Builders Association. He served in the Second Australian Imperial Force for 18 months during the Second World War. Fraser was elected unopposed to parliament as the Liberal member for Gordon at the 1953 state election. He replaced the incumbent Liberal member Harry Turner who had resigned in late 1952 to successfully contest the federal seat of Bradfield at the by-election caused by the death of Billy Hughes. A by-election for Gordon was not held as parliament was dissolved within two months of Turner's resignation. Fraser retained the seat for three terms of parliament but remarkably never faced an election as he was re-elected unopposed at the 1956 and 1959 elections. Fraser lost the Liberal endorsement to Harry Jago and unsuccessfully contested the 1962 election as an independent. After his defeat, he retired from public life. He did not hold party, parliamentary or ministerial office afterwards.

New South Wales Legislative Assembly
Preceded by Harry Turner	Member for Gordon; 1953 – 1962	Succeeded by Harry Jago
