= 1938 Texas lieutenant gubernatorial election =

- November 8, 1938
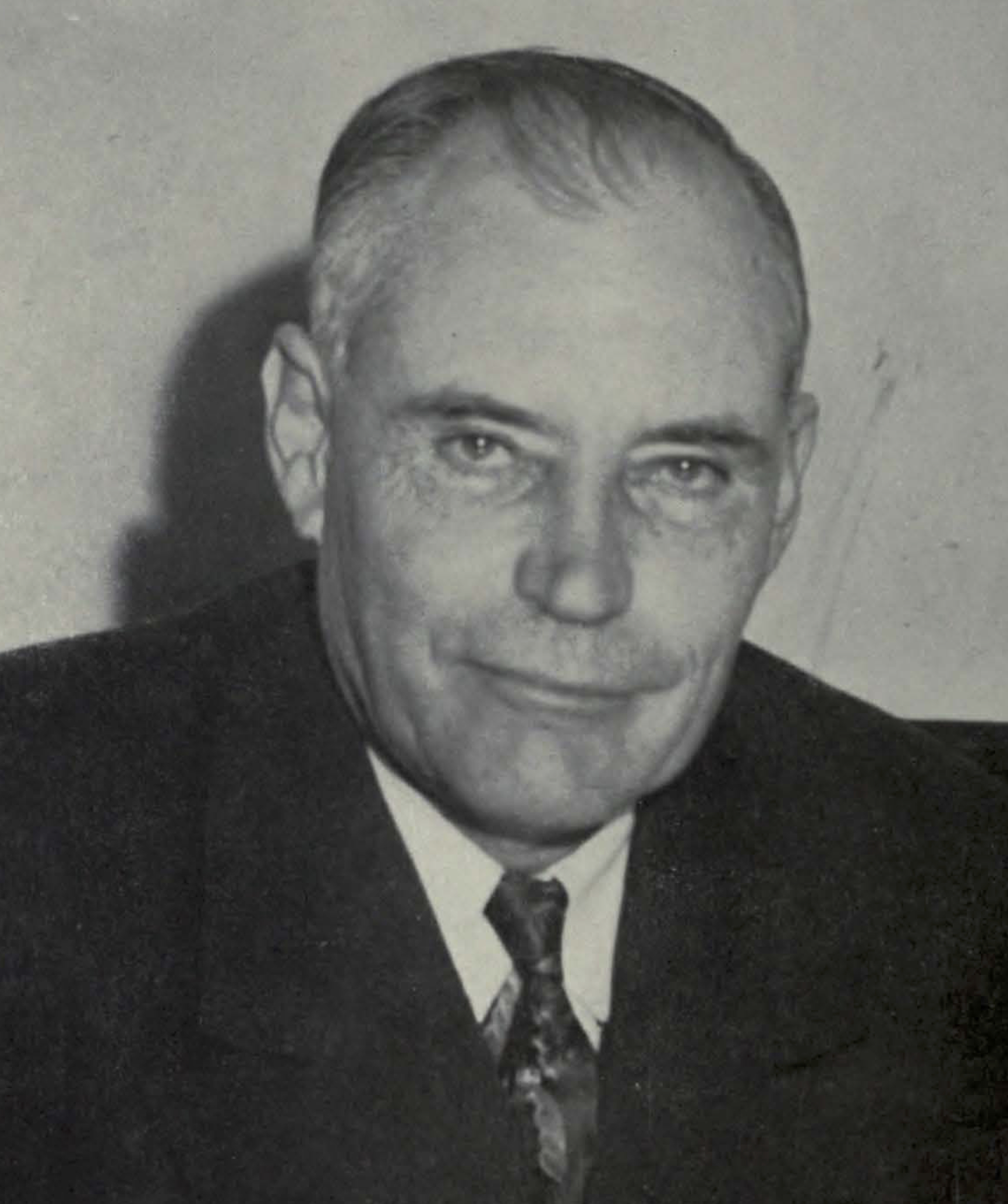
| Nominee | Coke R. Stevenson |
| Party | Democratic |
| Popular vote | 361,498 |
| Percentage | 99.71% |
Lieutenant Governor before election
Walter Frank Woodul
Democratic
Elected Lieutenant Governor
Coke R. Stevenson
Democratic

The 1938 Texas lieutenant gubernatorial election was held on November 8, 1938, in order to elect the lieutenant governor of Texas. Democratic nominee and former Speaker of the Texas House of Representatives Coke R. Stevenson defeated Communist nominee Cecil B. Robinett.

== General election ==
On election day, November 8, 1938, Democratic nominee Coke R. Stevenson won the election by a margin of 360,450 votes against his opponent Communist nominee Cecil B. Robinett, thereby retaining Democratic control over the office of lieutenant governor. Stevenson was sworn in as the 31st lieutenant governor of Texas on January 17, 1939.

=== Results ===
Texas lieutenant gubernatorial election, 1938
| Party | Candidate | Votes | % |
|---|---|---|---|
| Democratic | Coke R. Stevenson | 361,498 | 99.71 |
| Communist | Cecil B. Robinett | 1,048 | 0.29 |
| Total votes | | 362,546 | 100.00 |
| Democratic hold | | | |
