= 1938 Argentine legislative election =

- 6 March 1938
- 81 of the 158 seats in the Chamber of Deputies
- Turnout: 68.26%
Party	Vote %	Seats	+/–
Concordancia	61.64	52	+4
Radical Civic Union	25.80	27	+23
Tucumán Radical Civic Union	2.41	2	0
This lists parties that won seats. See the complete results below.
Results by province

Legislative elections were held in Argentina on 6 March 1938. Voter turnout was 68%.

== Results ==
Party or alliance		Votes	%	Seats	
Party or alliance		Votes	%	Won	Total
Concordancia	National Democratic Party	599,751	34.23	26	57
Concordancia	Santa Fe Radical Civic Union	157,958	9.02	6	9
Concordancia	Concordancia	156,325	8.92	10	—
Concordancia	Antipersonalist Radical Civic Union	34,280	1.96	1	9
Concordancia	Unified Radical Party	36,468	2.08	2	2
Concordancia	Reorganized National Democratic Party	22,936	1.31	2	—
Concordancia	Unified Radical Civic Union	22,751	1.30	1	3
Concordancia	Liberal Party of Corrientes	16,646	0.95	0	1
Concordancia	People's Party	11,700	0.67	2	2
Concordancia	Salta Radical Civic Union	9,328	0.53	1	—
Concordancia	Buenos Aires Province Radical Civic Union	6,375	0.36	0	—
Concordancia	San Juan Radical Civic Union	4,522	0.26	1	—
Concordancia	Blockist Radical Civic Union	966	0.06	0	—
Concordancia	Impersonalist Radical Civic Union	20	0.00	0	—
Concordancia	Total	1,080,026	61.64	52	83
Radical Civic Union		452,025	25.80	27	65
Socialist Party		99,291	5.67	0	5
Tucumán Radical Civic Union		42,312	2.41	2	5
Socialist Workers' Party		26,530	1.51	0	0
Labour Gathering Party		13,859	0.79	0	0
Defenders of State Employees Group		8,550	0.49	0	0
Independent Democratic Party		8,158	0.47	0	0
Radical Civic Union – Opposition Block		6,785	0.39	0	0
Radical Party		4,071	0.23	0	0
National Labor Party		3,357	0.19	0	0
Federalist Radical Civic Union		2,636	0.15	0	0
Independent Radical Civic Union		1,878	0.11	0	0
National Democratic Party (Graffignista)		1,574	0.09	0	0
Others		1,078	0.06	0	0
Total		1,752,130	100.00	81	158
Valid votes		1,752,130	96.19		
Invalid/blank votes		69,400	3.81		
Total votes		1,821,530	100.00		
Registered voters/turnout		2,705,347	67.33		
Source: National Congress

=== Results by province ===
Province	Concordance			UCR			PS			Others		
Province	Votes	%	Seats	Votes	%	Seats	Votes	%	Seats	Votes	%	Seats
Buenos Aires	359,455	83.55	14	62,777	14.59	7	7,842	1.82	0	151	0.03	0
Buenos Aires City	94,174	26.3	5	132,129	36.91	11	71,843	20.07	0	59,795	16.7	0
Catamarca	16,743	99.98	2	—	—	—	—	—	—	3	0.01	0
Córdoba	62,943	37.93	2	90,707	54.67	4	4,109	2.47	0	8,158	4.91	0
Corrientes	86,498	99.89	3	—	—	—	—	—	—	88	0.1	0
Entre Ríos	66,426	52.47	2	54,755	43.25	1	2,047	1.61	0	3,357	2.65	0
Jujuy	15,802	100	2	—	—	—	—	—	—	—	—	—
La Rioja	12,334	100	2	—	—	—	—	—	—	—	—	—
Mendoza	47,938	74.41	4	12,961	20.12	1	878	1.36	0	2,640	4.09	0
Salta	35,010	89.32	3	2,125	5.422	0	179	0.45	0	1,878	4.79	0
San Juan	28,424	91.14	3	439	1.4	0	748	2.39	0	1,574	5.04	0
Santa Fe	157,958	65.08	6	75,511	31.11	3	8,385	3.45	0	832	0.34	0
Santiago del Estero	63,227	86.62	3	9,763	13.37	0	—	—	—	—	—	—
Tucumán	33,094	36.96	1	10,858	12.12	0	3,260	3.64	0	42,312	47.26	2
Total	1,080,026	61.64	52	452,025	25.79	27	99,291	5.66	0	120,788	6.89	2
