= 1938 Uruguayan constitutional referendum =

A double referendum on constitutional reform was held in Uruguay on 27 March 1938. Both sets of reforms were approved by voters.

== Proposed changes ==
The first set of reforms had been proposed in a constitutional law on 30 December 1936. They would recognise the "lema" system of factions within political parties and allow several presidential candidates for each lema. The most voted for candidate from the most voted for lema would win the presidential election. The law would also reorganise the Senate.

The second set of reforms was put forward by the General Assembly on 24 February 1938. They would restrict each lema to a single candidate for president, as well as reorganising local government. As this was an administrative initiative by two-fifths of the Assembly, a majority of registered voters voting in favour was required. This was achieved, with 52.47% of all registered voters approving the reforms.

== Results ==
=== Proposal I ===
Choice	Votes	%
For	333,802	93.45
Against	23,385	6.55
Invalid/blank votes		–
Total	357,187	100
Registered voters/turnout	636,171	
Source: Direct Democracy

=== Proposal II ===
Choice	Votes	%
For	333,802	97.99
Against	6,847	2.01
Invalid/blank votes		–
Total	340,649	100
Registered voters/turnout	636,171	
Source: Direct Democracy

== See also ==
- Uruguayan Constitution
