= Tim Moore (Australian politician) =

Australian politician

Timothy John Moore AM (born 8 November 1948) is a Judge of the NSW Land and Environment Court and a former Australian politician. He was the Liberal member for Gordon in the New South Wales Legislative Assembly from 1976 to 1992, and Minister for the Environment from 1989 to 1992.

== Career ==
The son of Sir John Moore, he was educated at Knox Grammar School. He worked in various manual positions, including an iron ore mine in the Northern Territory, and in 1974 became Treasurer and Honorary Secretary of the Industrial Relations Society of Australia. In 1976, he was elected to the New South Wales Parliament as the Liberal member for Gordon. He completed his Bachelor of Law through the University of New South Wales in 1977, in which year he also became a Shadow Minister.

In May 1983, he undertook an observer mission to Sri Lanka on behalf of the International Commission of Jurists and was the last western observer on the Jaffna Peninsula prior to the outbreak of the civil war involving the Tamil Tigers.

Moore, who was convenor of the Liberal Friends of Israel, was appointed Minister for the Environment and Assistant Minister for Transport in 1988, when the Coalition won government under Nick Greiner. His portfolio was reduced to Environment only in 1989.

== Metherell affair ==
In April 1992, Moore announced a public exhibition and submission process for a National Parks and Wildlife Service assessment report for twenty three nominated wilderness areas, having been influenced by former Liberal minister-turned Independent MP Terry Metherell's "Wilderness (Declaration of New Areas) Bill 1992". Metherell was offered a position with the Environment Protection Agency by the government, which he accepted, but the Legislative Assembly referred Metherell's appointment to the Independent Commission Against Corruption, which found that the dealings had been corrupt. Premier Greiner and Moore both resigned, although the Supreme Court of New South Wales later ruled that the ICAC had overreached its powers in making the decision. The by-election for Moore's seat was won by Liberal candidate Jeremy Kinross.

== After leaving politics ==
After his resignation in July 1992, Moore was appointed as Executive Director of the NSW Master Builders Association. His brief was to clean up the Association after adverse findings made in the NSW Royal Commission into the Building Industry. After implementing a wide range of reforms to the Association's management, rules and finances, Moore resigned in late 1993. He moved to Canberra, taking up appointment as an Assistant Secretary in the Department of Prime Minister and Cabinet as head of the Aboriginal Reconciliation Branch. In this role, he was also Secretary to the Council for Aboriginal Reconciliation.

After the change of Commonwealth government in 1996, Moore returned to Sydney and commenced practice at the Sydney Bar in 1997. He practised primarily in commercial, planning, environmental and building law.

In November 2002, he was appointed by the Carr government as a Commissioner of the NSW Land and Environment Court. In March 2009, he was appointed the Court's Senior Commissioner. He completed a post-graduate Diploma in Planning (Distinction) at the University of Technology (Sydney), graduating in early 2009.

In July 2011, he was appointed (by the O'Farrell government) Co-Chair (with Ron Dyer - a former Carr government Minister) to undertake a review of the NSW planning system. In December 2011, he and Mr Dyer released an Issues Paper based on an extensive, State-wide community and stakeholder consultation process. After consideration of the more than 600 submissions to the Issues Paper (and earlier submissions), Volume 1 (Major Issues) and Volume 2 (Other Issues) of their Review Paper with recommendations for a new planning system in NSW were prepared and provided to the Minister for Planning and Infrastructure.

On Saturday 14 July 2012 the Minister released Mr Moore and Mr Dyer's Review Report, The Way Ahead for Planning in NSW Volume 1 (Major Issues) and Volume 2 (Other Issues), together with the Government's initial response to the Review, A New Planning System for NSW - Green Paper. The release of these papers marked the end of their work on the Review.

He then resumed his role at the Land and Environment Court. In June 2015, he was appointed an Acting Judge of the Court. From 4 January 2016, he was appointed as a Judge of the Court, being sworn in on 2 February 2016.

In 2017, he initiated a trial of conducting proceedings in longer trials, in the Court's resumption compensation jurisdiction, on a paperless basis. Virtually all material was tendered on a USB stick and projected, as need arose, on a screen or the courtroom wall. The technology used was deliberately unsophisticated - comprising a PC connected to a data projector. The judge and counsel each had a laser pointer to direct attention the relevant material being considered. The first two such trials - presided over by Justice Moore - saved an estimated 100,000 pages of photocopying with additional energy and other environmental savings. This new process also provided access to justice benefits as all in the courtroom (including parties to the litigation and other lay observers) were able to be completely informed of what was being dealt with at any given time. Three more paperless trials took place prior to the end of the 2017 Law Term (one continuing in 2018) and more have been scheduled for 2018. The potential long term environmental and cost savings are significant and the reform will continue in longer civil matters in the Court.

== Honours ==
Moore was appointed a Member of the Order of Australia in the 2023 King's Birthday Honours for "significant service to the judiciary and to the law, to the Parliament of New South Wales, and to industrial relations".

== Family life ==
Moore was married four times. His first marriage in 1973 produced no children; on 7 July 1979, he married Jane Stackpool, with whom he had twin daughters. They were later divorced, and Moore married Eve Gavel in 1994, with whom he had one son. They too were divorced, and Moore made his final marriage, to Leanne Philpott, on 26 March 2009. They have two children, a daughter, Emily, (2002) and a son, Luke (2004).

New South Wales Legislative Assembly
Preceded by Kevin Harrold	Member for Gordon; 1976–1992	Succeeded by Jeremy Kinross
