= Philip Goldfinch =

Australian politician

Sir Philip Goldfinch KBE
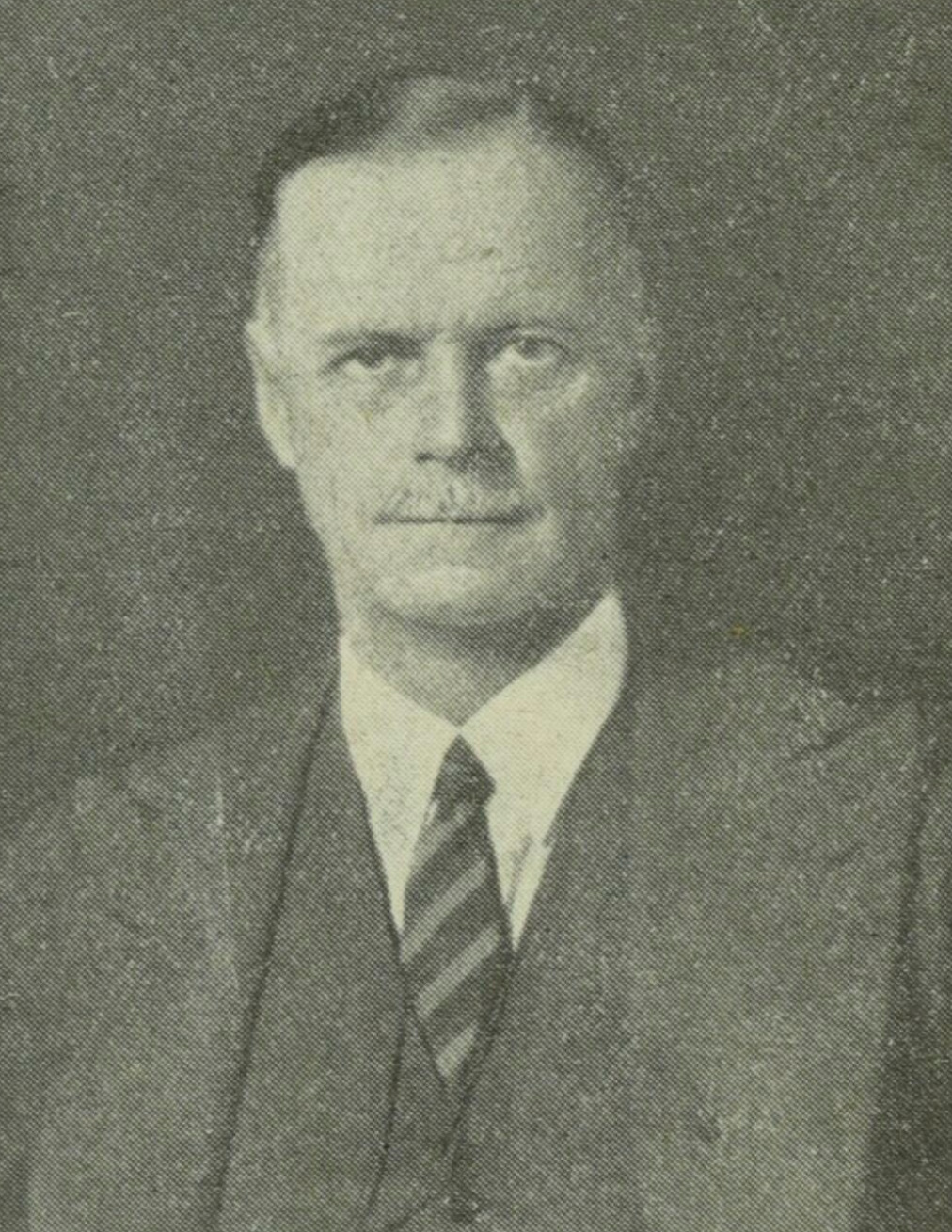

Member of the New South Wales Legislative Assembly
- In office 8 November 1935 – 5 July 1937
- Preceded by: Thomas Bavin
- Succeeded by: Harry Turner
- Constituency: Gordon

Personal details
- Born: Philip Henry Macarthur Goldfinch; 13 April 1884 Gosport, Hampshire, England
- Died: 7 April 1943 (aged 58) Roseville, New South Wales, Australia
- Party: UAP
- Other political affiliations: Old Guard
- Spouse: Mary Medora Cowper (m. 1911)
- Relations: Philip Gidley King II (grandfather)
- Education: Sydney Grammar School

Sir Philip Henry Macarthur Goldfinch KBE (13 April 1884 – 7 April 1943) was an Australian businessman and politician.

Philip Goldfinch was born at Gosport, Hampshire, England, to Henry Edward Goldfinch, a lieutenant in the Royal Navy, and Elizabeth Maria (née King). He arrived in New South Wales in 1886 and was educated at Sydney Grammar School before working for the Colonial Sugar Refining Company (CSRC) in 1902 as a chemist. On 7 March 1911 he married Mary Cowper, with whom he had three children.

Goldfinch was appointed general manager of CSRC in 1928 and served until 1943; he was also chairman of the British Settlers' Welfare Committee from 1931.

In 1930, Goldfinch chaired a series of secret meetings to convene the Old Guard, a right-wing paramilitary organisation organised in opposition to the policies of New South Wales Premier Jack Lang.

Goldfinch was created a Knight Commander of the Order of the British Empire in 1934.

Goldfinch was nominated for a by-election to be held on 23 November 1935 for the Gordon electorate in the New South Wales Legislative Assembly, representing the United Australia Party (UAP). The by-election was required after the resignation of the sitting member, former premier Thomas Bavin, who was appointed a judge of the New South Wales Supreme Court. At the close of nominations on 8 November Goldfinch was the only candidate, so he was declared elected to the seat.

In early July 1937 Goldfinch wrote to Bertram Stevens, the premier and leader of the UAP in New South Wales, advising him that he was resigning as member for Gordon. He cited business commitments as the reason for his decision.

Sir Philip Goldfinch died on 7 April 1943 at his residence in Roseville, aged 58.

New South Wales Legislative Assembly
Preceded by Sir Thomas Bavin	Member for Gordon; 1935–1937	Succeeded by Harry Turner
