= Harry Turner (Australian politician) =

Australian politician

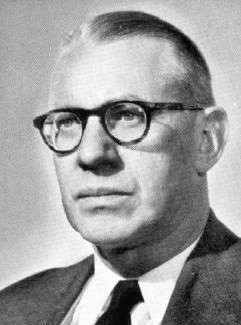

Member of the NSW Parliament for Gordon
- In office 7 August 1937 – 18 November 1952
- Preceded by: Sir Philip Goldfinch
- Succeeded by: Stewart Fraser

Member of the Australian Parliament for Bradfield
- In office 20 December 1952 – 11 April 1974
- Preceded by: Billy Hughes
- Succeeded by: David Connolly

Personal details
- Born: 8 July 1905 Woolwich, New South Wales, Australia
- Died: 19 September 1988 (aged 83) Killara, New South Wales, Australia
- Party: United Australia Party (1937–45); Liberal Party of Australia (1945–74)
- Spouse: Mildred Mary Raymond
- Children: Four
- Education: University of Sydney; Cambridge University
- Occupation: Barrister

Henry Basil Turner (8 July 1905 – 19 September 1988) was an Australian politician. Born in Woolwich, New South Wales to metallurgist Basil William Turner and Mabel Lily, née Breillat, he attended Malvern School in Sydney, and then the University of Sydney and Cambridge University. In 1930 he became a barrister. He married Mildred Mary Raymond at Mosman on 4 July 1931; they were to have three daughters and a son.

In 1937, he was elected to the New South Wales Legislative Assembly for the seat of Gordon, representing the United Australia Party. He held the seat until 1952, during which time the United Australia Party became the Liberal Party. He was on military service 1940–44. In 1952, following the death of Billy Hughes, Turner successfully contested the resulting by-election for the federal seat of Bradfield. He held the seat until his retirement in 1974; during that time he was often a delegate to overseas conventions, including the United Nations in 1963. He died in 1988 at Killara.

New South Wales Legislative Assembly
| Preceded by Sir Philip Goldfinch | Member for Gordon; 1937–1952 | Succeeded by Stewart Fraser |
Parliament of Australia
| Preceded by Billy Hughes | Member for Bradfield; 1952–1974 | Succeeded by David Connolly |
