= Electoral district of Gordon (New South Wales) =

Former state electoral district of New South Wales, Australia

Gordon was an electoral district of the Legislative Assembly in the Australian state of New South Wales. Originally created in 1904, replacing Willoughby. With the introduction of proportional representation, it was absorbed into the five-member electorate of Ryde, along with Burwood and Willoughby. It was recreated in 1927, but was abolished in 1999. It originally covered most of the suburbs of the Ku-ring-gai Council local government area (then known as Ku-ring-gai Municipality), including the suburbs of Lindfield and Gordon.

Recent Member of Parliament representing Gordon included:

- Harry Jago, who was NSW State Minister for Health in the Liberal party government of Robert Askin 1962–1973, and who famously failed to be re-elected at the 1973 election because he forgot to lodge the official nomination form by the required date.
- Kevin Harrold, MP from 1973 to 1976 representing the Democratic Labor Party, the only person ever elected to a single-member electorate in New South Wales representing that party. He was elected mainly as a consequence of the failure of Harry Jago to re-nominate.
- Tim Moore, MP from 1976 to 1992.

At the redistribution prior to the 1995 state election, the electorate of Gordon was abolished. The suburbs previously included in the Gordon electorate were mostly reassigned to Ku-ring-gai, with some other sections to Willoughby and some smaller ones to Davidson. Subsequent redistributions have resulted in most of the suburbs formerly in Gordon electorate now being within the Davidson electorate.

== Members for Gordon ==
First incarnation (1904–1920)
Member	Party	Term
Charles Wade	Liberal Reform	1904–1917
Thomas Bavin	Nationalist	1917–1920
Second incarnation (1927–1999)
Member	Party	Term
(Sir) Thomas Bavin	Nationalist	1927–1931
(Sir) Thomas Bavin	United Australia	1931–1935
Sir Philip Goldfinch	United Australia	1935–1937
Harry Turner	United Australia	1937–1945
Harry Turner	Liberal	1945–1952
Stewart Fraser	Liberal	1953–1962
Stewart Fraser	Independent	1962
Harry Jago	Liberal	1962–1973
Kevin Harrold	Democratic Labor	1973–1976
Tim Moore	Liberal	1976–1992
Jeremy Kinross	Liberal	1992–1999

== Election results ==
1995 New South Wales state election: Gordon
Party	Candidate	Votes	%	±%
Liberal	Jeremy Kinross	22,928	68.0	−6.5
Labor	Jan Butland	4,174	12.4	+1.1
Democrats	Ann Barry	2,635	7.8	−2.6
Greens	Ross Knowles	2,009	6.0	+6.0
Stop Dual Occupancy	Tanya Wood	1,102	3.3	+3.3
Call to Australia	Margaret Ratcliffe	700	2.1	−1.8
Citizens Electoral Council	Leone Hay	156	0.5	+0.5
Total formal votes		33,704	96.8	+2.7
Informal votes		1,106	3.2	−2.7
Turnout		34,810	93.4	
Two-party-preferred result
Liberal	Jeremy Kinross	25,108	80.3	−3.3
Labor	Jan Butland	6,171	19.7	+3.3
Liberal hold		Swing	−3.3	
