= Ministry of Education and Religious Affairs (Pasundan) =

Former government ministry of Pasundan

- Kementerian Pengajaran dan Agama

Agency overview
- Formed: 8 May 1948
- Dissolved: 11 January 1950
- Superseding agencies: Ministry of Education; Ministry of Religious Affairs
- Minister responsible: Oesman Joedakoesoemah (first) Oesman Joedakoesoemah (last Minister of Education) Ahmad Hassan (last Minister of Religious Affairs)
- Agency executive: Syafei Soemardja, Secretary General

The Ministry of Education and Religious Affairs was a government ministry of the State of Pasundan. The ministry was responsible for the schools, university, and religious matters in the State of Pasundan.

== Transfer of power ==
After the establishment of the Adil Cabinet on 8 May 1948, prime minister Adil Puradiredja appointed Oesman Joedakoesoemah as the Minister of Education and Religious Affairs. The formation of the ministry was done a month later, on 11 June 1948, after the handover of the authority from the Recomba (government commissioner for administrative affairs) to the Minister of Justice. The instrument of transfer for this purpose was the Staatsblaad (State Gazette) 1948 No. 116.

Even though most of the authorities regarding to education and religion was given to the ministry, the federal government still managed matters relating to secondary educations, higher educations (university) and the supply of textbooks and other educational equipment. Nevertheless, the limitations in the ministry was less than the limitations in other ministries.

== Goals ==
According to the ministry, the goals for the education in the State of Pasundan are as the following:

- Raising the standard of education in the State of Pasundan to a level equivalent to that of other nations as soon as possible.
- To lead children and youth, based on their abilities, so that the future society of the state would consist of intellectual citizens which could properly fulfill the task assigned to them, optimistic citizens which could create innovations, and pride citizens which aware of his own worth and his people, in accordance with the spirit of an independent society.
- Spiritual education, which is moral education and character formation in a pedagogical sense. In additional to the education, the ministry also provides a new form of spiritual education: to make students aware of its original nature, so that he is not tossed to and fro by all kinds of worldly events, but remains firm and has a hold on faith in God.

== Division of ministry ==
After the formation of the Anwar Cabinet on 11 January 1950, the Ministry of Education and Religious Affairs was divided into two different ministries: the Ministry of Education, headed by Minister Oesman Joedakoesoemah, and the Ministry of Religious Affairs, headed by Minister Ahmad Hassan.

== Ministers ==
No	Portrait	Name	Took office	Left office	Cabinet	R
1		Oesman Joedakoesoemah	8 May 1948	14 October 1948	Adil	
2		Prawiradinata	10 January 1949	31 January 1949	Djumhana I	
3		Judawinata	31 January 1949	18 July 1949	Djumhana II	
4		Oesman Joedakoesoemah	18 July 1949	11 January 1950	Djumhana III	
5		Oesman Joedakoesoemah (Minister of Education)	11 January 1950	23 January 1950	Anwar	
5		Ahmad Hassan (Minister of Religious Affairs)	11 January 1950	23 January 1950	Anwar	

== Bibliography ==
- Government of Pasundan (1949), Satu Tahun Berdirinja Negara Pasundan, Bandung
- Ministry of Foreign Affairs (1948), Indonesië in de Veiligheidsraad van de Verenigde Naties (Maart-October 1948), The Hague: Staatsdrukkerij
- Kahin, George McTurnan (1952), Nationalism and Revolution in Indonesia, Ithaca, New York: Cornell University Press
