= Ministry of Home Affairs (Pasundan) =

Former government ministry of Pasundan

- Kementerian Dalam Negeri

- Emblem of the Pasundan Police Department (de jure under the Ministry)

Agency overview
- Formed: May 8, 1948
- Dissolved: 23 January 1950
- Minister responsible: Adil Puradiredja (first) Anwar Tjokroaminoto (last)
- Agency executives: Gaos Hardjasoemantri, Secretary General; Raden Yusuf, Chief of the Pasundan Police Department

The Ministry of Home Affairs was a government ministry of the State of Pasundan. The ministry was responsible for the control of the state apparatus, civil service, and the Pasundan Police Department.

== Transfer of power ==
After the establishment of the Adil Cabinet on 8 May 1948, prime minister Adil Puradiredja appointed himself as the Minister of Home Affairs. The formation of the ministry was done a month later, on 11 June 1948, after the handover of the authority from the Recomba (government commissioner for administrative affairs) to the Minister of Home Affairs. The instrument of transfer for this purpose was the Staatsblaad (State Gazette) 1948 No. 116.

According to George McTurnan Kahin, the transfer of power was pitifully meager. For example, according to the second article of the instrument of transfer, "provisions concerning the rehabilitation of residencies and regencies" would continue to be taken care of by the Dutch government in Batavia until such time as the latter made other arrangements. This caused territorial heads of Pasundan (residents and regents) being appointed by the Dutch government in Batavia, resulting in three out of four Pasundan residents being Dutch.

Other powers that were severely limited by the Dutch government in Batavia was the Pasundan Police Department. The instrument of transfer limited the power transfer so that the exercise of the authority did not apply where federal interests were concerned. The "federal interest" was interpreted by the Attorney General of the Netherlands Indies to include the authority over the Pasundan Police Department. Thus, the Pasundan Police Department was under the direct control of the Attorney General.

The subordination of the police to the Attorney General of the Dutch East Indies was questioned by Ating, one of the police commissioners in Pasundan. He was subsequently arrested on 14 January 1949 by the Dutch army commander in Pasundan, Major General Engels.

== National Civil Service and Police Meeting ==
Shortly after the formation of the ministry, the ministry held the first National Civil Service and Police Meeting in Bandung. The meeting resulted in several decisions about the guidelines for the national development.

== Ministers ==
No	Portrait	Name	Took office	Left office	Cabinet	R
1		Adil Puradiredja	8 May 1948	10 January 1949	Adil	
2		Djumhana Wiriaatmadja	10 January 1949	31 January 1949	Djumhana I	
3		Ma'moen Soemadipradja	31 January 1949	18 July 1949	Djumhana II	
3		Ma'moen Soemadipradja	18 July 1949	11 January 1950	Djumhana III	
4		Anwar Tjokroaminoto	11 January 1950	23 January 1950	Anwar	

== Bibliography ==
- Bastiaans, W. Ch. J. (1950), Personalia Van Staatkundige Eenheden (Regering en Volksvertegenwoordiging) in Indonesie (per 1 Sept. 1949) (PDF), Jakarta
- Toer, Pramoedya Ananta; Toer, Koesalah Soebagyo; Kamil, Ediati (1999), Kronik revolusi Indonesia: 1948, Jakarta: Kepustakaan Populer Gramedia
- Government of Pasundan (1949), Satu Tahun Berdirinja Negara Pasundan, Bandung
- Kahin, George McTurnan (1952), Nationalism and Revolution in Indonesia, Ithaca, New York: Cornell University Press
