= Third Djumhana Cabinet =

Third Djumhana Cabinet Kabinet Djumhana III
- 4th Cabinet of Pasundan
- 1949–1950
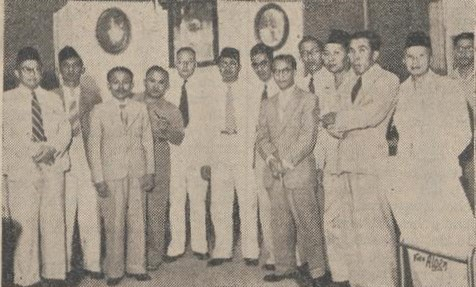
- Date formed: 18 July 1949
- Date dissolved: 11 January 1950

People and organisations
- Head of state: Wiranatakusumah
- Head of government: Djumhana Wiriaatmadja
- No. of ministers: 9 ministers

History
- Predecessor: Djumhana II Cabinet
- Successor: Anwar Cabinet

The Third Djumhana Cabinet (Indonesian: Kabinet Djumhana III) was the fourth cabinet established by the State of Pasundan. It was composed of nine ministers and one official. Its term of office ran from 18 July 1949 to 11 January 1950.

== Background ==
On 16 July 1949, the Indonesia, Unity, Indonesian Nationhood Party and the Pasundan People's Party in the Parliament of Pasundan were united to form a "National Front". The front stated that they demand the entire cabinet to resign and for the prime minister to form a new cabinet on a broader basis.

The formation of the cabinet was announced on 17 July 1949, and the cabinet was installed on the following day. The program of the cabinet was to:

- Establishment of a strong order in the State of Pasundan
- Elimination of illiteracy
- Struggle for a free and sovereign United States of Indonesia based on the Renville Agreement and the Roem–Van Roijen Agreement

== Composition ==
=== Ministers ===
Portfolio	Minister	Took office	Left office	Ref
Prime Minister	Djumhana Wiriaatmadja	18 July 1949	11 January 1950	
Minister of Home Affairs	Ma'mun Sumadipraja	18 July 1949	11 January 1950	
Minister of Economy	Suradiradja	18 July 1949	11 January 1950	
Minister of Finance	P. J. Gerke	18 July 1949	11 January 1950	
Minister of Education and Religious Affairs	Oesman Joedakoesoemah	18 July 1949	11 January 1950	
Minister of Transportation and Irrigation	Soeriakartalegawa	18 July 1949	11 January 1950	
Minister of Social Affairs	Ardiwinangun	18 July 1949	11 January 1950	
Minister of Justice	Kartajumena	18 July 1949	11 January 1950	
Minister of Health	Kornel Singawinata	18 July 1949	11 January 1950	
State Minister	D. Sukardi	18 July 1949	11 January 1950	

== The end of the cabinet ==
After the recognition of Indonesia by the Dutch government on 27 December 1949, Djumhana resigned as the prime minister. The outgoing cabinet was officially replaced by the Anwar Cabinet on 11 January 1950.

== Bibliography ==
- Helius, Sjamsuddin; Ekadjati, Edi S.; Marlina, Kuswiah; Wiwi, Ietje (1992), Menuju Negara Kesatuan: Negara Pasundan, Jakarta: Ministry of Education and Culture
