= Djerman Prawirawinata =

Indonesian politician

Raden Djerman Prawirawinata
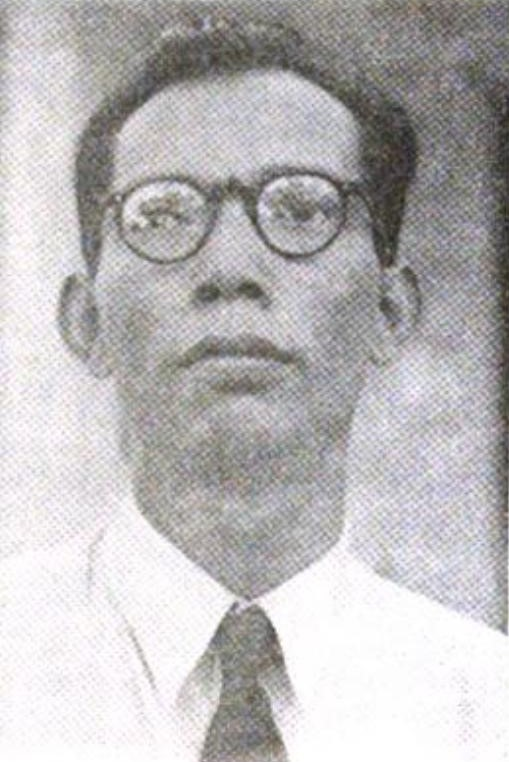

Minister of State
- In office 11 January 1950 – 23 January 1950
- Prime Minister: Anwar Tjokroaminoto
- Preceded by: Didi Sukardi
- Succeeded by: position abolished

Member of the People's Representative Council
- In office 16 September 1950 – 24 June 1960
- President: Sukarno

Personal details
- Born: 19 July 1916 Purwakarta, West Java, Dutch East Indies
- Died: 14 December 1980 (aged 64) Bandung, West Java, Indonesia
- Party: Masyumi
- Cabinet: Anwar Cabinet

Military service
- Allegiance: Indonesia
- Branch/service: Army
- Years of service: 1945–1949
- Rank: Captain
- Commands: Taruna Negara Brigade

Djerman Prawirawinata (19 July 1916 — 14 December 1980) was a Sundanese politician who served as the last Minister of State of Pasundan and a member of the People's Representative Council.

== Early life ==
Djerman was born on 19 July 1916 in Purwakarta, West Java, Dutch East Indies. He finished his education at the Hollandsch-Inlandsche School in Bandung in 1932 and the Meer Uitgebreid Lager Onderwijs section B in Bandung (equivalent to junior high school) in 1936 He began to work during the Dutch East Indies era as an entrepreneur. During the Japanese occupation of the Dutch East Indies, he worked as a civil servant at the Bandung city government. He also served in Japanese sponsored organizations, such as the Head of the Administrative Affairs of the Bandung Hōkōkai and as an advisor to the Seinendan, a youth self-defense organization.

Djerman was a member of the Jasana Obor Pasundan (Pasundan Torch Foundation), a scouting organization for the Sundanese. He became the Deputy Chairman of the organization.

== Military career ==
Following the Proclamation of Indonesian Independence, Djerman joined the newly formed Masyumi party. He became the chairman of the political council of the party's branch in Priangan. He joined the newly formed Indonesian Army following the Bandung Sea of Fire incident. He was enlisted as a captain and was put as the Command of the Taruna Negara (Youth of the Nation) Brigade which was part of the Siliwangi Division. He also served as the secretary of the Regional Defence Council of Priangan and the coordinator for the southern battlefront of Priangan. During a battle with the Dutch forces, Djerman was arrested and became a POW from February 1948 until April 1949.

During his military career, Djerman was involved in the establishment of the Indonesian National Committee of Bandung, the forerunner to the City Council of Bandung. At first, he became the secretary of the committee, then as a member, and later as the Deputy Chairman.

After the Dutch–Indonesian Round Table Conference was signed, a peace treaty was established between the Indonesian and the Dutch forces. Djerman retired from the military following the peace treaty.

== Political career ==
=== Minister of State ===
On 11 January 1950, Djerman was installed by Prime Minister of Pasundan Anwar Tjokroaminoto as the Minister of State in his cabinet. Djerman held the office for 12 days until the cabinet was dissolved on 23 January 1950. Djerman officially represented the Gerakan Muslimin Indonesia (Indonesian Muslim Movement) in the cabinet.

=== Member of the People's Representative Council ===
Djerman was appointed as a member of the People's Representative Council of the United States of Indonesia from the State of Pasundan. However, due to bureaucratic problems, Djerman was never installed and his membership was canceled on 14 August 1950. He was instead appointed as the Secretary of the Religion and Information Commissariat in West Java, and as the Head of the Peranakans and Foreigners Affairs of West Java in February 1950. During this period, Djerman was diagnosed with tuberculosis. However, as Mohammad Roem noted, he still participated actively in parliamentary and Masyumi party conferences.

Following the dissolution of the United States of Indonesia, the People's Representative Council was also dissolved. A new provisional People's Representative Council was established, and Djerman became a member of the council in 1950.

Djerman ran in the 1955 Indonesian legislative election as a candidate for the People's Representative Council from the Masyumi party, representing West Java. He won a seat in the election and was inaugurated as a member on 24 March 1956. The council was dissolved on 23 July 1959 but Djerman was appointed by the president to a transitional People's Representative Council. He was inaugurated as a member of the transitional People's Representative Council on 12 August 1959 and ended his term on 24 June 1960.

== Death ==
Djerman died of stomach cancer at the Hasan Sadikin Hospital in Bandung at 20.00 UTC+7 on 14 December 1980. He was buried at the Sirna Raga public cemetery in a funeral led by E.Z. Mutaqin. At the funeral, Mutaqin announced that the Governor of West Java, Aang Kunaefi, officially designated Djerman as an elder of the West Java province.

Following his death, the Pasundan Torch Foundation announced that the expenses for the education of Djerman's children would be covered by the foundation.

== Works ==
- Prawirawinata, Djerman (1950). Menudju kesatuan bangsa [Towards the Unity of the Nation] (in Indonesian). Bandung: Federasi Penghapus Minoritet.
