= Oesman Joedakoesoemah =

Indonesian politician (1909–1989)

Raden Oesman Joedakoesoemah
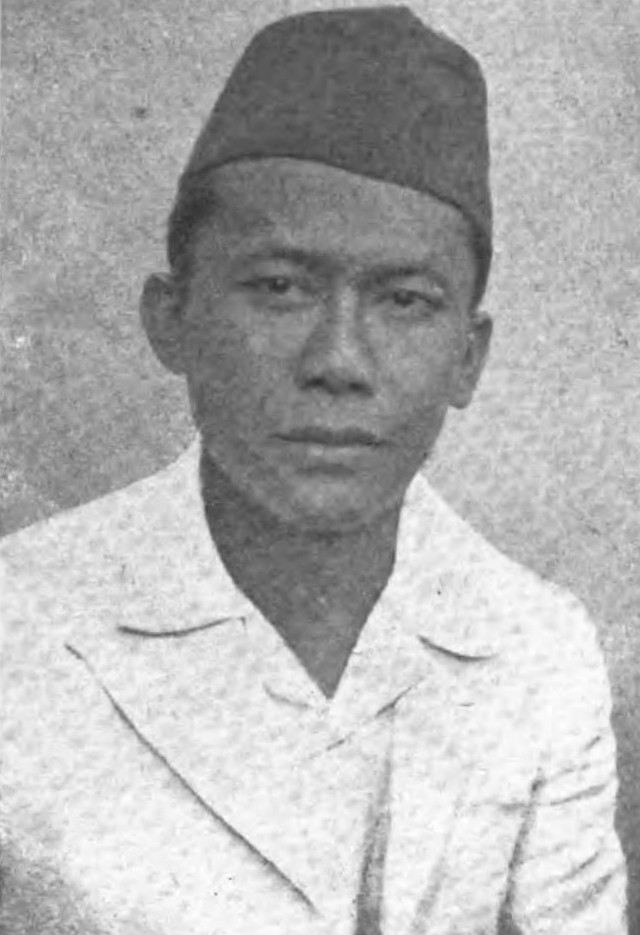

Minister of Education and Religious Affairs of Pasundan (Note: As Minister of Education since 11 January 1950)
- In office 18 July 1949 – 23 January 1950
- Prime Minister: Djumhana Wiriaatmadja; Anwar Tjokroaminoto
- Preceded by: Judawinata
- Succeeded by: office abolished
- In office 8 May 1948 – 14 October 1948
- Prime Minister: Adil Puradiredja
- Preceded by: office established
- Succeeded by: Prawiradinata

Personal details
- Born: October 12, 1909 Majalaya, West Java, Dutch East Indies
- Died: June 2, 1989 (aged 79) Bandung, West Java, Indonesia
- Children: Iskandar Wahidiyat

Oesman Joedakoesoemah (12 October 1909 – 2 June 1989) was an Indonesian teacher and bureaucrat who served as the Minister of Education and Religious Affairs in the State of Pasundan and Director of Cultural Affairs in the Ministry of Education of the Republic of Indonesia.

== Early life and education ==
Oesman was born on 12 October 1909 in Majalaya. Upon completing his basic education at the Hollandsch-Inlandsche School (HIS, equivalent to elementary school) and Kweekschool (equivalent to junior high school), Oesman continued his education to Hollandsch Inlandsche Kweekschool (HIK), a high school for training teachers, and graduated in 1929. Oesman attended a hoofdacte course in Bandung in 1936, a two-year program for experienced teachers (with at least five years of teaching) to prepare them as school principals. He graduated from the course in 1938.

== Career ==
Oesman began teaching in HIS after graduating from HIK. He taught at HIS in Cilegon from 1929 to 1932 and in Serang from 1932 to 1934, with him serving as the chair of the Paguyuban Pasundan education board in Serang during her latter stint. Afterwards, he began teaching in Schakelschool, an extension education for People's School (elementary school for indigenuous Indonesians). He taught at the school in Garut from 1934 to 1935, Ambon and Bandung from 1935 to 1936.

After attending the hoofdacte course, Oesman taught at the Schakelschool in Bogor from 1938 to 1941. During this time, Oesman was also a member of the executive council of Paguyuban Pasundan in the regency. In 1941, Oesman was appointed as the headmaster of a Schakelschool owned by Paguyuban Pasundan in Sukabumi. During the Japanese occupation of the Dutch East Indies, Oesman taught at a junior high school in Cirebon.

Shortly after the founding of the State of Pasundan, Oesman was appointed as the state's inaugural minister of education and religious affairs by prime minister Adil Puradiredja. Oesman served in the Adil Cabinet from 8 May 1948 to 10 January 1949. He was reappointed for the same position by prime minister Djumhana Wiriaatmadja in the Third Djumhana Cabinet from 18 July 1949 to 11 January 1950. After Djumhana was replaced by Anwar Tjokroaminoto, the ministry of education and religious affairs was split into the ministry of education and ministry of religious affairs, and Oesman was entrusted to head the ministry of education from 11 to 23 January 1950. Anwar's cabinet was the last cabinet to exist in the State of Pasundan, as the state was incorporated into the Republic of Indonesia several weeks later.

Oesman joined Indonesia's ministry of education and was appointed as the ministry's representative in West Java, and later as the coordinator of education inspectorate in West Java until 28 January 1957. He was later appointed as chief of cultural services in the ministry by minister Sarino Mangunpranoto, serving in the position from 14 December 1956 until his retirement sometime in the 1960s. After his retirement, Joedakoesoemah became a member of the board of donors of the Padjadjaran University. He died on 2 June 1989 in Bandung.

Oesman's son, Iskandar Wahidiyat, was a professor of pediatrics at the University of Indonesia and served as the university's postgraduate faculty dean from 1989 until 1996.
