= Oesman (name) =

Oesman is a given name and surname. People associated with the name include:

- Oesman Sapta Odang
- Syahrial Oesman
- Oesman Joedakoesoemah

== See also ==
- Oesman
