= Ministry of Justice (Pasundan) =

Former government ministry of Pasundan

- Kementerian Kehakiman

Agency overview
- Formed: 8 May 1948
- Dissolved: 23 January 1950
- Headquarters: DENIS Bank Building, Braga Street 14, Bandung (now the office of the Bank of West Java)
- Employees: 61 (1949)
- Annual budget: ƒ 1,090,150 (1948)
- Minister responsible: Suparman (first) Barnas Wiratanuningrat (last)
- Agency executive: Soenarija Koesoemah, Secretary General

The Ministry of Justice was a government ministry of the State of Pasundan. The ministry was responsible for the justice system, penitentiary system, publishing of government gazette, dactyloscopy, and beachcombing in the State of Pasundan.

== Transfer of power ==
After the establishment of the Adil Cabinet on 8 May 1948, prime minister Adil Puradiredja appointed Suparman as the Minister of Home Affairs. The formation of the ministry was done one month later, on 11 June 1948, after the handover of the authority from the Recomba (government commissioner for administrative affairs) to the Minister of Justice. The instrument of transfer for this purpose was the Staatsblaad (State Gazette) 1948 No. 116.

The authority of the court system in Pasundan is reserved for the Supreme Court of the United States of Indonesia, while the authority of the prison system was run by the Ministry of Justice and the federal government. The minimum security prison in Bandung, Sumedang, Garut, Tasikmalaya, Ciamis, Bogor, Sukabumi, Cirebon (except for the federal prison), and Majalengka were held by the Ministry of Justice, while the maximum security prison, the federal prison in Ciamis, the Sukamiskin and Kuningan Prison, were held by the federal government. The authority for the registration of prison sentences of more than one year and prison statistics, were also done by the federal government.

Due to the larger authorities held by the federal government, the Pasundan government was powerless to hinder the wide-scale political arrests of members of its Indonesian population by the Dutch; it could no nothing to succor them once they were arrested.

== Duties ==
According to the Staatsblaad (State Gazette) 1948 No. 232, dated 23 September 1948, the duties of the Recomba that were handed over to the Ministry of Justice covered the following:

- orphanages, real estates, notary, and civil status
- penitentiary system
- statistics, justice administration, and the handling of prisoners
- recognition of associations and compliance with the articles of association of public limited liability companies
- name adoption and change
- civil, commercial and criminal law, and all government interference related to it and to the judiciary in general
- beachcombing
- witnessing of legalization
- dactyloscopy
- nurturing of minors placed under the supervision of the state
- rehabilitation of prisoners
- legal advice for governmental bodies
- land acquisition for the interests of the state

By the Decree of the Wali Negara No. 117 and 118 dated 25 November 1948, the Ministry of Justice was handed with the publishing of government gazettes. The first gazette, the Berita Negara Pasundan (Pasundan State News), covers the announcement of laws, state regulations, etc. The second gazette, the Warta Resmi Pasundan (Pasundan Official Gazette), covers the announcement of decrees, official appointments by the state, and official announcements.

== Building ==
After the formation of the ministry, the ministry was given two rooms (later eight rooms) at the Gedung Sate (Satay Building) in Bandung. On 1 May 1949, due to lack of space in the Satay Building, the ministry moved into the third floor at the DENIS Bank Building, located at the Braga Street No. 14.

== Ministers ==
No	Portrait	Name	Took office	Left office	Cabinet	R
1		Suparman	8 May 1948	14 October 1948	Adil	(Note: Suparman died in office on 14 October 1948.)
—		Tan Hwat Tiang	18 October 1948	10 January 1949	Adil	(Note: Suparman died in office on 14 October 1948.)
2		Oto Koesoemasoebrata	10 January 1949	31 January 1949	Djumhana I	
3		Soedibjo Dwidjosewojo	31 January 1949	18 July 1949	Djumhana II	
4		Abdurachim Kartadjumena	18 July 1949	11 January 1950	Djumhana III	
5		Barnas Wiratanuningrat	11 January 1950	23 January 1950	Anwar	

== Bibliography ==
- Satu Tahun Berdirinja Negara Pasundan, Bandung: Government of Pasundan, 1949
- Kahin, George McTurnan (1952), Nationalism and Revolution in Indonesia, Ithaca, New York: Cornell University Press
