= Ministry of Health (Pasundan) =

Former government ministry of Pasundan

- Kementerian Kesehatan

Agency overview
- Formed: May 8, 1948
- Dissolved: 23 January 1950
- Minister responsible: Maskawan (first) Djundjunan Setiakusuma (last)
- Agency executive: Secretary General

The Ministry of Health was a government ministry of the State of Pasundan. The ministry was responsible for the health system, vaccination programs, hospitals, and clinics in the State of Pasundan.

== Transfer of power ==
After the establishment of the Adil Cabinet on 8 May 1948, prime minister Adil Puradiredja appointed Maskawan as the Minister of Home Affairs. The formation of the ministry was done one month later, on 11 June 1948, after the handover of the authority from the Recomba (government commissioner for administrative affairs) to the Minister of Health. The instrument of transfer for this purpose was the Staatsblaad (State Gazette) 1948 No. 116.

== Ministers ==
No	Portrait	Name	Took office	Left office	Cabinet	R
1		Maskawan	8 May 1948	14 October 1948	Adil	
2		M. H. A. Patah	19 January 1949	31 January 1949	Djumhana I	
—		Tan Hwat Tiang	31 January 1949	18 July 1949	Djumhana II	
4		Kornel Singawinata	18 July 1949	11 January 1950	Djumhana III	
5		Djundjunan Setiakusuma	11 January 1950	23 January 1950	Anwar	

== Bibliography ==
- Government of Pasundan (1949), Satu Tahun Berdirinja Negara Pasundan, Bandung
- Kahin, George McTurnan (1952), Nationalism and Revolution in Indonesia, Ithaca, New York: Cornell University Press
