= Anwar Cabinet =

Anwar Cabinet may refers to:

- Anwar Ibrahim Cabinet
- Anwar Tjokroaminoto Cabinet
