= Second Djumhana Cabinet =

1949 cabinet of Pasundan, Java

Second Djumhana Cabinet Kabinet Djumhana II
- 3rd Cabinet of Pasundan
- 1949
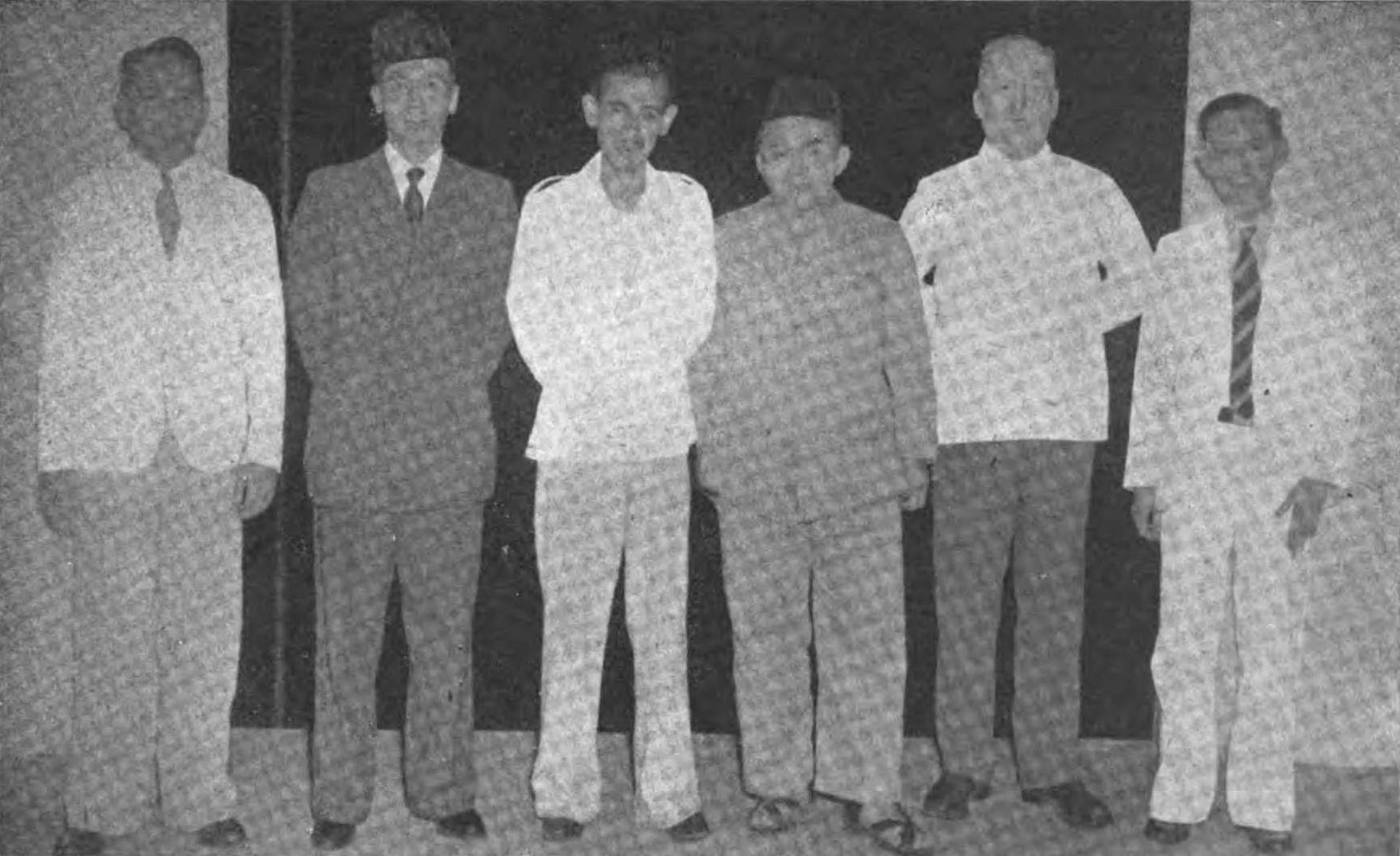
- Date formed: 31 January 1949
- Date dissolved: 18 July 1949

People and organisations
- Head of state: Wiranatakusumah
- Head of government: Djumhana Wiriaatmadja
- No. of ministers: 8 ministers

History
- Predecessor: Djumhana I Cabinet
- Successor: Djumhana III Cabinet

The Second Djumhana Cabinet (Indonesian: Kabinet Djumhana II) was the third cabinet established by the State of Pasundan. It was composed of eight ministers. Its term of office ran from 31 January to 18 July 1949.

== Background ==
After the Dutch managed to force the resignation of the First Djumhana Cabinet on 28 January 1949, Djumhana was left with only two ministers. The only way in which Djumhana could form a new cabinet was by dropping his former program and substituting it with an extremely mild one.

The program of the Second Djumhana Cabinet which he formed at the beginning of February called for the establishment of a sovereign and free federal Indonesia as soon as possible and formation of an interim government in which the Republic of Indonesia would take part.

== Composition ==
=== Ministers ===
Portfolio	Minister	Took office	Left office	Ref
Prime Minister	Djumhana Wiriaatmadja	31 January 1949	18 July 1949	
Deputy Prime Minister; Minister of Social Affairs	Adil Puradiredja	31 January 1949	18 July 1949	
Minister of Home Affairs	Ma'mun Sumadipraja	31 January 1949	18 July 1949	
Minister of Economy	Kartajumena	31 January 1949	18 July 1949	
Minister of Finance	P. J. Gerke	31 January 1949	18 July 1949	
Minister of Education and Religious Affairs	Judawinata	31 January 1949	18 July 1949	
Minister of Transportation and Irrigation; Minister of Health	Tan Hwat Tiang	31 January 1949	18 July 1949	
Minister of Justice	Sudibjo Dwidjosewojo	31 January 1949	18 July 1949	

== The end of the cabinet ==
On 16 July 1949, the Indonesia, Unity, Indonesian Nationhood Party and the Pasundan People's Party in the Parliament of Pasundan were united to form a "National Front". The front stated that they demand the entire cabinet to resign and for the prime minister to form a new cabinet on a broader basis. The cabinet officially resigned on 18 July 1949, after the installation of the Third Djumhana Cabinet.

== Bibliography ==
- Bastiaans, W. Ch. J. (1950), Personalia Van Staatkundige Eenheden (Regering en Volksvertegenwoordiging) in Indonesie (per 1 Sept. 1949) (PDF), Jakarta
- Kahin, George McTurnan (1961), Nationalism and Revolution in Indonesia, Ithaca, New York: Cornell University Press
