= First Djumhana Cabinet =

First Djumhana Cabinet Kabinet Djumhana I
- 2nd Cabinet of Pasundan
- 1949
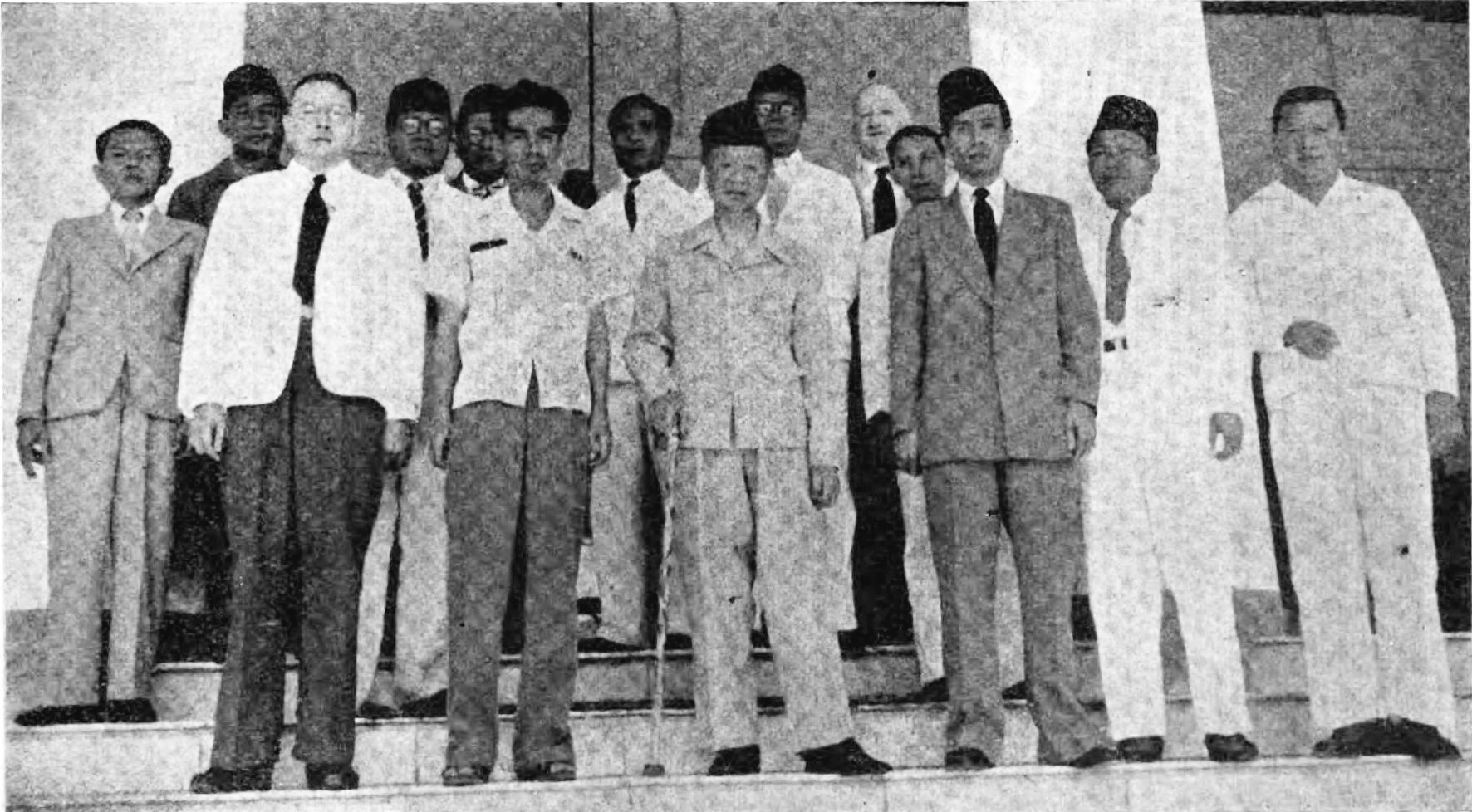
- Date formed: 10 January 1949
- Date dissolved: 31 January 1949

People and organisations
- Head of state: Wiranatakusumah
- Head of government: Djumhana Wiriaatmadja
- No. of ministers: 7 ministers

History
- Predecessor: Adil Cabinet
- Successor: Djumhana II Cabinet

The First Djumhana Cabinet (Indonesian: Kabinet Djumhana I) was the second cabinet established by the State of Pasundan. It was composed of nine ministers and one official. Its term of office ran from 10 to 31 January 1949.

== Background ==
After the resignation of the Adil Cabinet on 19 December 1948, the prime minister of Netherlands, Willem Drees, held a visitation to Indonesia. The visitation was meant to discuss the formation of a federal interim government of Indonesia. The plan was to hold a conference in Jakarta in January 1949, on which the newly formed cabinet, led by Adil Puradiredja, would attend. The plan failed, as the Dutch failed to pressure the Parliament of Pasundan to reelect Adil.

In response to the failure of the plan, the commander of the Dutch forces in Indonesia Simon Spoor, and the High Commissioner of the Crown in the State of Pasundan R.W. van Diffelen went to Wiranatakusumah, the Wali Negara (head of state) of Pasundan. They pressured Wiranatakusumah to immediately appoint a new cabinet formateur so that a new government is formed quickly.

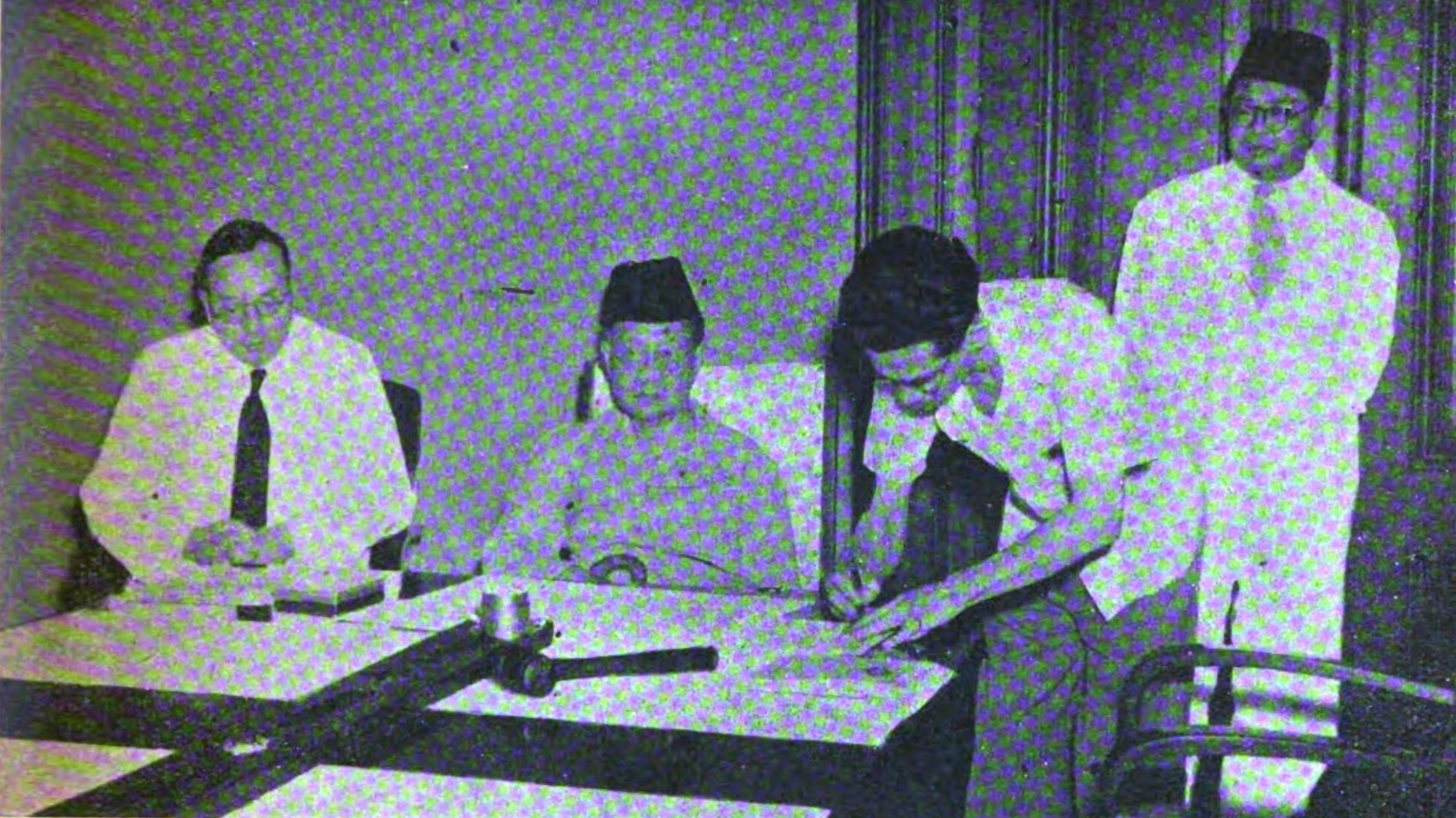
Djumhana signing his oath form as the cabinet formateur of Pasundan on 28 December 1948.

Finally, on 28 December 1948, Wiranatakusumah appointed Djumhana Wiriaatmadja, a non-party member of the parliament, as the cabinet formateur. In forming the cabinet, Djumhana presented the programs of his cabinet:

- Rehabilitation of the Republic of Indonesia as of 18 December 1948 under of Sukarno and Hatta
- Immediate formation of an interim government in which the Republic of Indonesia was included
- Continue the negotiations between the government of the Republic of Indonesia and the Netherlands under United Nations auspices
- Representation of each constituent states of projected federal Indonesia in proportion to its population.

Based on his program, Djumhana was able to obtain majority parliamentary backing for his cabinet. The Indonesian fraction approved the program but rejected to be given the position in the cabinet.

=== Initial composition ===
Initially, Djumhana proposed a cabinet that includes pro-Indonesian politicians:

- Prime Minister: Djumhana Wiriaatmadja
- Minister of Home Affairs: Raden Mas Sewaka
- Minister of Finance: P. J. Gerke
- Minister of Health: Maskawan
- Minister of Economy: R.S. Suradiredja
- Minister of Social Affairs: Maria Ulfah Santoso
- Minister of Justice: Tirtawinata
- Minister of Development: Abdul Karim
- Minister of Transportation: Tan Hwat Tiang
- Minister of Education: Ukar Bratakusumah
- State Ministers: Oto Kusumasubrata, M.S. Yudawinata

It turned out that three ministers: Raden Mas Sewaka, Ukar Bratakusumah, and Maria Ulfah Santoso, rejected their position. Djumhana then reshuffled his proposal, and formed a new cabinet.

== Composition ==
=== Ministers ===
Portfolio	Minister	Took office	Left office	Ref
Prime Minister; Minister of Home Affairs	Djumhana Wiriaatmadja	10 January 1949	31 January 1949	
Minister of Economy	Suradiradja	10 January 1949	31 January 1949	
Minister of Finance	P. J. Gerke	10 January 1949	31 January 1949	
Minister of Education and Religious Affairs	R. P. Prawiradinata	18 January 1949	31 January 1949	
Minister of Transportation and Irrigation	Tan Hwat Tiang	10 January 1949	31 January 1949	
Minister of Justice	Oto Kusumasubrata	10 January 1949	31 January 1949	
Minister of Health	M. H. A. Patah	19 January 1949	31 January 1949	

== Aftermath ==
After the formation of the new cabinet, Djumhana headed to Jakarta to attend the conference. It turned out his program was rejected by the Dutch for being pro-Indonesian and the Dutch pressured Djumhana to change his program. Djumhana rejected the request, but he was willing to participate in the talks on Bangka Island with the Indonesian government that was arrested, along with four other members of the federal state.

Due to his rejection, Louis Beel, the High Commissioner of the Dutch East Indies, wrote to Wiranatakusumah and demanded to him that if the Djumhana cabinet programs were not promptly dropped, the State of Pasundan would be scrapped in favor of a strictly military government. To further emphasize his action, Louis Beel sent Major General Engels and R.W. van Diffelen to meet the Wali Negara. Both stated that if the demands were not fulfilled, then the Dutch military would arrest a number of the leading members of the Pasundan government. The Dutch presented to him a black list of to be arrested politicians, including his son. Wiranatakusumah threatened to resign from his position if the arrest occurred.

To avoid further disobedience by Wiranatakusumah, the Dutch began the arrest on 14 January 1949. The arrested politicians were different from the list. The arrest occurred while Wiranatakusumah was on a working trip around Pasundan, and Djumhana was in Bangka Island.

== The end of the cabinet ==
Soon after the arrest, the Parliament of Pasundan withdrew its support to the cabinet and four ministers from the cabinet resigned. Djumhana tried in vain for a week to rearrange his cabinet, and on 28 January 1949, his cabinet officially resigned.

== Bibliography ==
- Bastiaans, W. Ch. J. (1950), Personalia Van Staatkundige Eenheden (Regering en Volksvertegenwoordiging) in Indonesie (per 1 Sept. 1949) (PDF), Jakarta
- Government of Pasundan (1949), Satu Tahun Berdirinja Negara Pasundan, Bandung
- Helius, Sjamsuddin; Ekadjati, Edi S.; Marlina, Kuswiah; Wiwi, Ietje (1992), Menuju Negara Kesatuan: Negara Pasundan, Jakarta: Ministry of Education and Culture
- Kahin, George McTurnan (1961), Nationalism and Revolution in Indonesia, Ithaca, New York: Cornell University Press
