= Oesman =

Oesman may refer to:

- Oesman Sadik Airport
- Rahadi Oesman Airport
- Oesman (name)
