= Anwar Tjokroaminoto Cabinet =

Anwar Cabinet Kabinet Anwar
- 5th Cabinet of Pasundan
- 1950
- Date formed: 11 January 1950
- Date dissolved: 23 January 1950

People and organisations
- Head of state: Wiranatakusumah
- Head of government: Anwar Tjokroaminoto
- No. of ministers: 11 ministers

History
- Predecessor: Djumhana III Cabinet
- Successor: Natsir Cabinet

The Anwar Cabinet (Indonesian: Kabinet Anwar) was the fifth cabinet established by the State of Pasundan. It was composed of 11 ministers. Its term of office ran from 11 to 23 January 1950.

== Background ==
After the recognition of Indonesia by the Dutch government on 27 December 1949, the previous prime minister Djumhana Wiriaatmadja resigned as the prime minister. Djumhana was replaced by Anwar Tjokroaminoto, the son of the national hero Oemar Said Tjokroaminoto. Initially, after the resignation, the task of forming the new cabinet and the position of the prime minister was given to Sewaka. Sewaka accepted this offer, but he also insisted that the programs of the cabinet would carry out efforts towards the dissolution of the State of Pasundan. Sewaka's demands were firmly rejected by Wiranatakusumah. The task was therefore given to Anwar Tjokroaminoto. Anwar was given the mandate to form the cabinet by Wiranatakusumah on 7 January 1950. He finished forming his cabinet on 9 January 1950, and the cabinet was installed on 11 January 1950.

There were several changes regarding to the nomenclature of the ministries in the Anwar Cabinet. There were two new ministries, the Ministry of Religious Affairs and the Ministry of Enlightenment.

== Composition ==
=== Ministers ===
Portfolio	Minister	Took office	Left office	Ref
Prime Minister; Minister of Home Affairs	Anwar Tjokroaminoto	11 January 1950	23 January 1950	
Minister of Economy	Suradiradja	11 January 1950	23 January 1950	
Minister of Finance	P. J. Gerke	11 January 1950	23 January 1950	
Minister of Education	Oesman Joedakoesoemah	11 January 1950	23 January 1950	
Minister of Transportation and Irrigation	Soeriakartalegawa	11 January 1950	23 January 1950	
Minister of Social Affairs	Sjafei Wirakusumah	11 January 1950	23 January 1950	
Minister of Justice; Minister of Enlightenment	Barnas Wiratanuningrat	11 January 1950	23 January 1950	
Minister of Health	Djundjunan Setiakusuma	11 January 1950	23 January 1950	
Minister of Religious Affairs	Ahmad Hassan	11 January 1950	23 January 1950	
State Minister	Djerman Prawirawinata	11 January 1950	23 January 1950	

== The end of the cabinet ==
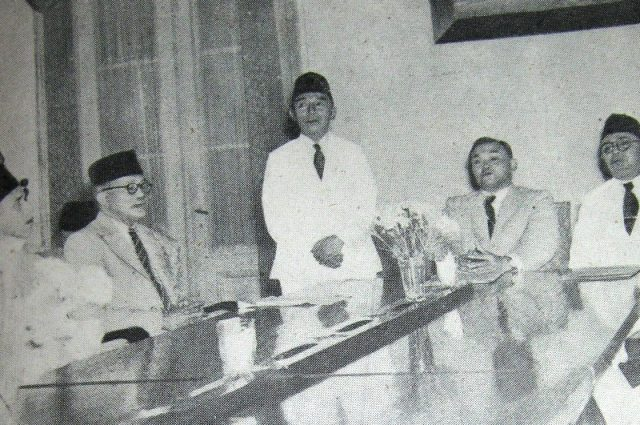
Handover of the Pasundan State to the Sewaka Governor

After the defeat of the APRA coup d'état on 23 January 1950, the government of the Republic of Indonesia accused the government of Pasundan for sponsoring the coup. Prime Minister Anwar Tjokroaminoto and Minister of Health Suria Kartalegawa was arrested, and the cabinet was dissolved. Seven days later, Wiranatakusumah, the head of state, stated that he would resign from his position.

After the resignation of Wiranatakusumah, the central government of the United States of Indonesia (RUSI) ordered Sewaka as the commissar of the RUSI for the State of Pasundan on 4 February 1950. The handover of the authority from Wiranatakusumah to Sewaka occurred on 10 February 1950. With the appointment of Sewaka, the State of Pasundan was under direct control of the United States of Indonesia.

== Bibliography ==
- Helius, Sjamsuddin; Ekadjati, Edi S.; Marlina, Kuswiah; Wiwi, Ietje (1992), Menuju Negara Kesatuan: Negara Pasundan, Jakarta: Ministry of Education and Culture
