= Adil Cabinet =

Adil Cabinet Kabinet Adil
- 1st Cabinet of Pasundan
- 1948–1949
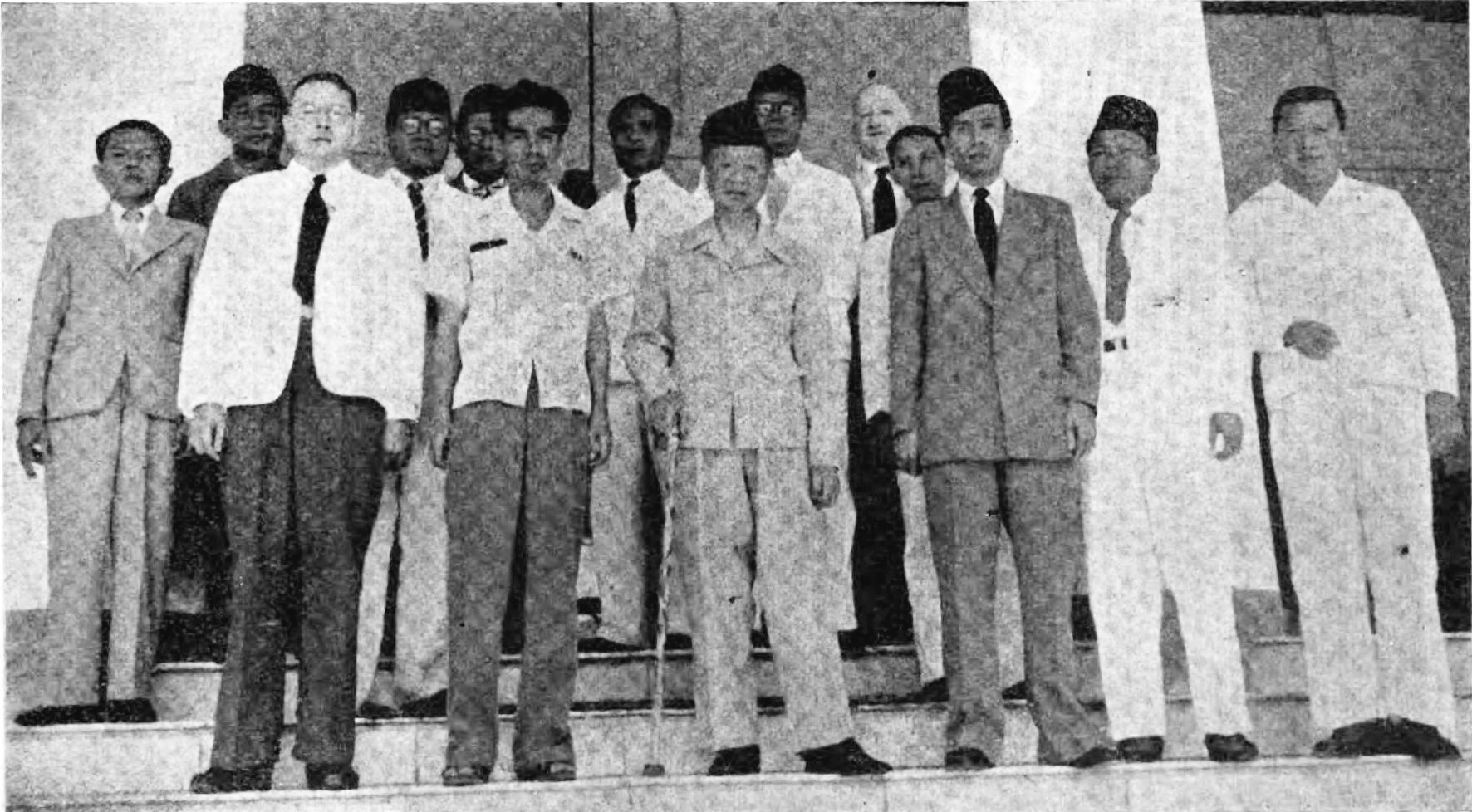
- Date formed: 8 May 1948
- Date dissolved: 10 January 1949

People and organisations
- Head of state: Wiranatakusumah
- Head of government: Adil Puradiredja
- No. of ministers: 8 ministers

History
- Successor: Djumhana I Cabinet

The Adil Cabinet (Indonesian: Kabinet Adil) was the first cabinet established by the State of Pasundan following the formation of the state on 28 April 1948. It was composed of eight ministers and one official. Its term of office ran from 8 May 1948 to 10 January 1949.

== Background ==
After the formation of the State of Pasundan, an election to choose the head of state of Pasundan was held on 28 February 1948. The election was won by R. A. A. Wiranatakusumah, and he was installed on 24 April 1948. Wiranatakusumah appointed Adil Puradiredja, a former resident of Priangan Regency, as the prime minister. Adil, along with his ministers, was officially installed on 8 May 1948. The cabinet was responsible to Prime Minister Adil Puradiredja.

== Composition ==
=== Ministers ===
Portfolio	Minister	Took office	Left office	Ref
Prime Minister; Minister of Home Affairs	Adil Puradiredja	8 May 1948	10 January 1949	
Minister of Economy	Dendadikusuma	8 May 1948	10 January 1949	
Minister of Finance	P. J. Gerke	8 May 1948	10 January 1949	
Minister of Education and Religious Affairs	Oesman Joedakoesoemah	8 May 1948	10 January 1949	
Minister of Transportation and Traffic Affairs	Tan Hwat Tiang	8 May 1948	10 January 1949	
Minister of Social Affairs	Bunjamin	8 May 1948	10 January 1949	
Minister of Justice	Suparman	8 May 1948	14 October 1948	
Minister of Justice	Tan Hwat Tiang	18 October 1948	10 January 1949	
Minister of Health	Maskawan	8 May 1948	10 January 1949	

=== Portraits ===
Ministers of the Adil Cabinet
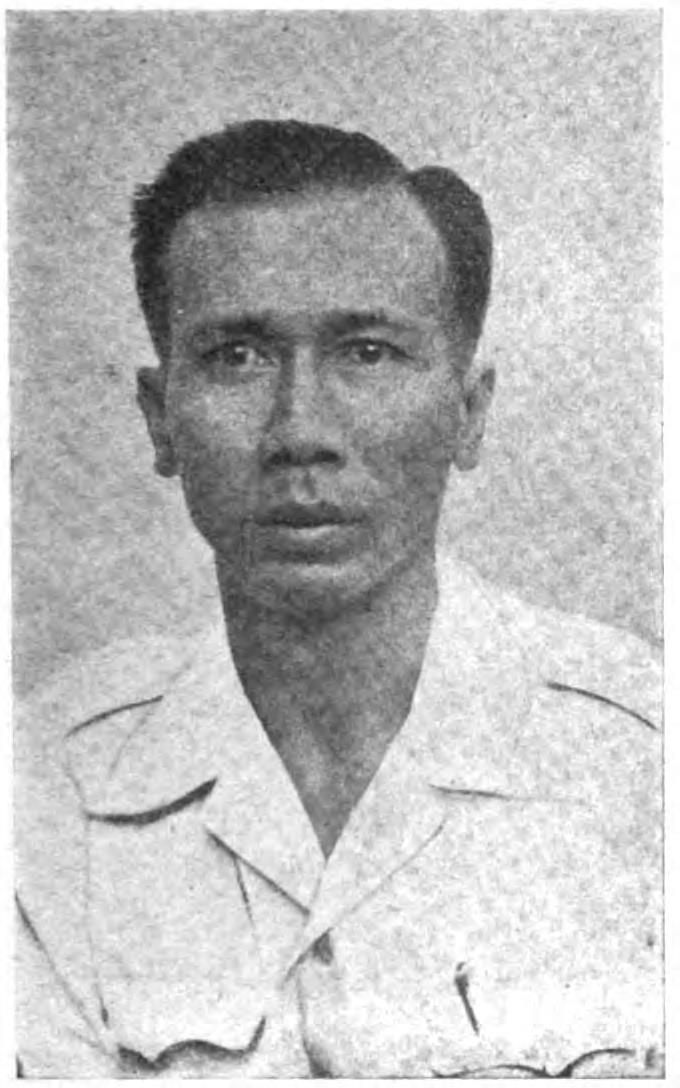
Adil Puradiredja, prime minister and minister of home affairs

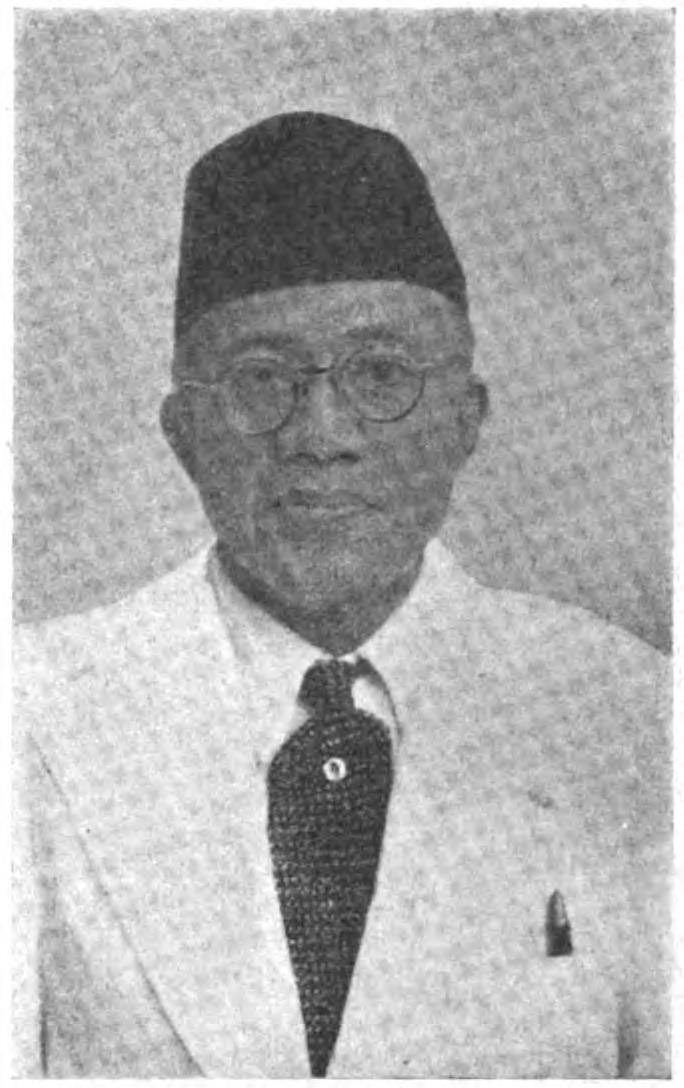
Dendadikusuma, minister of economy

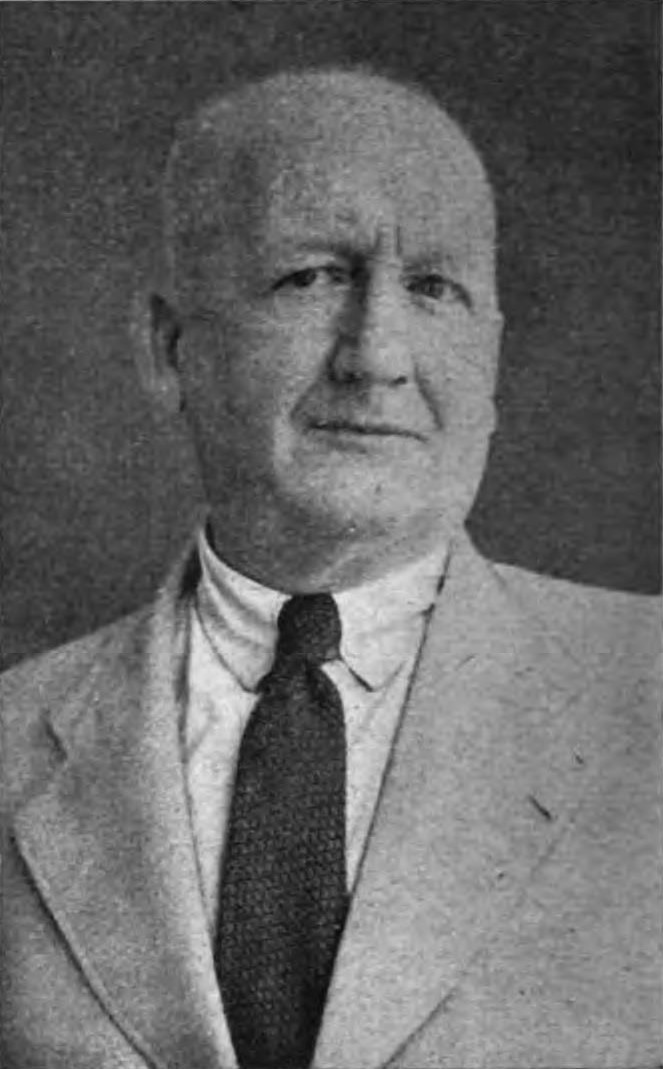
P. J. Gerke, minister of finance

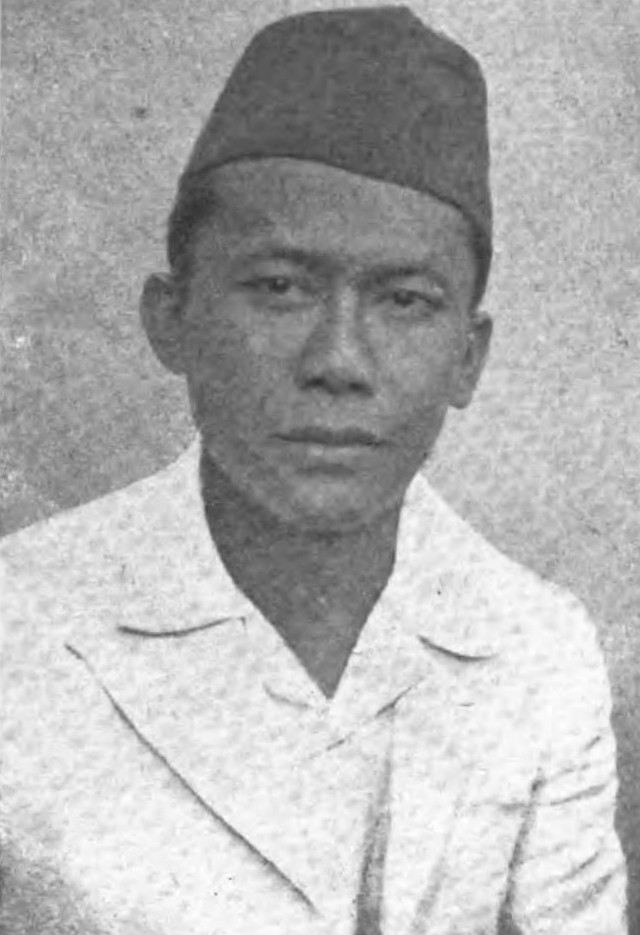
Oesman Joedakoesoemah, minister of education and religious affairs

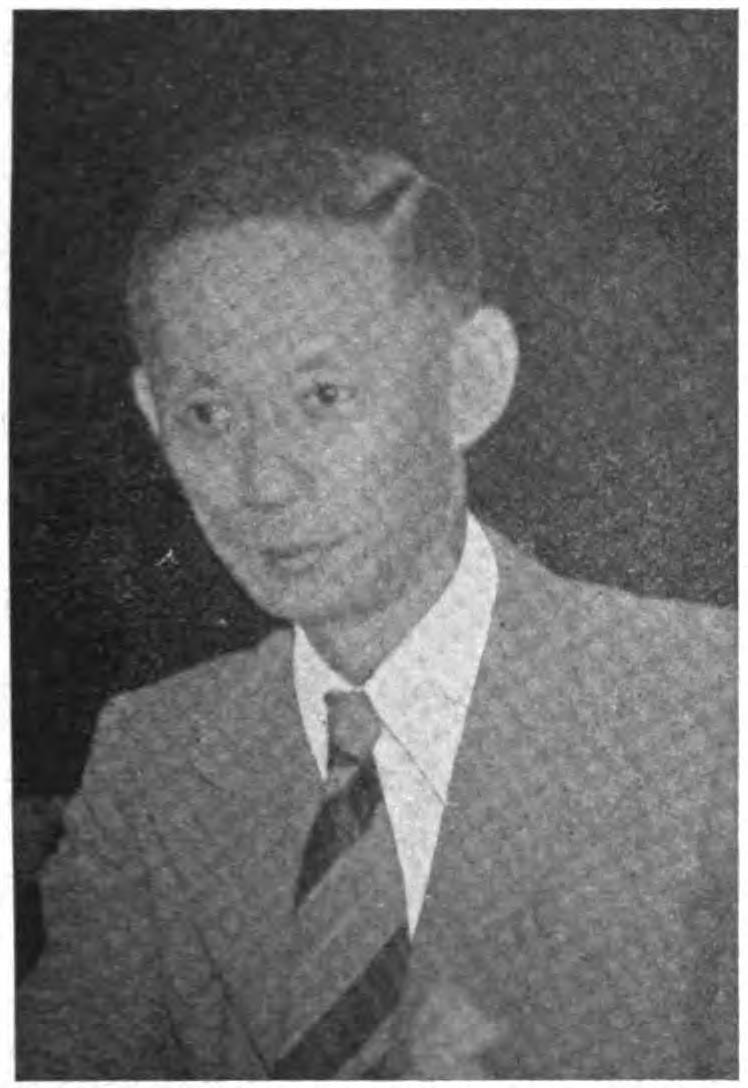
Tan Hwat Tiang, minister of transportation and traffic affairs

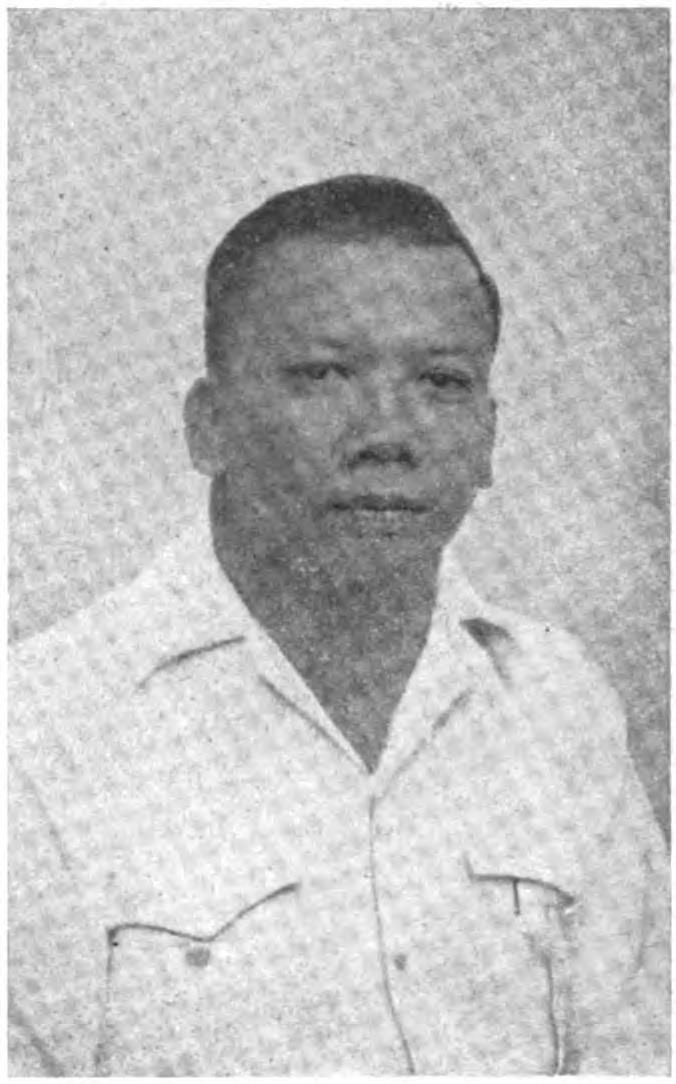
Dr. Bunjamin, minister of social affairs

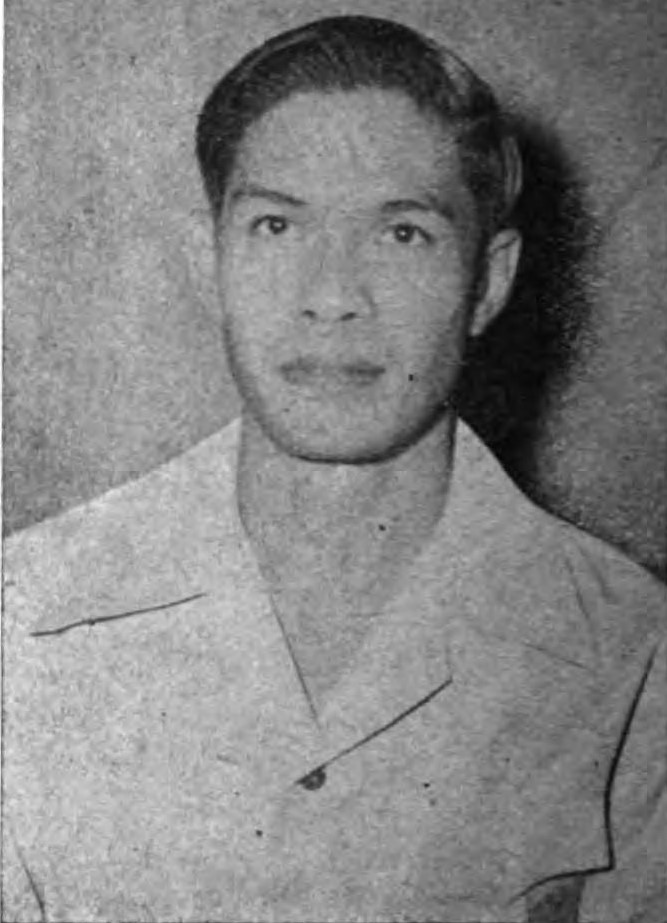
Suparman, minister of justice

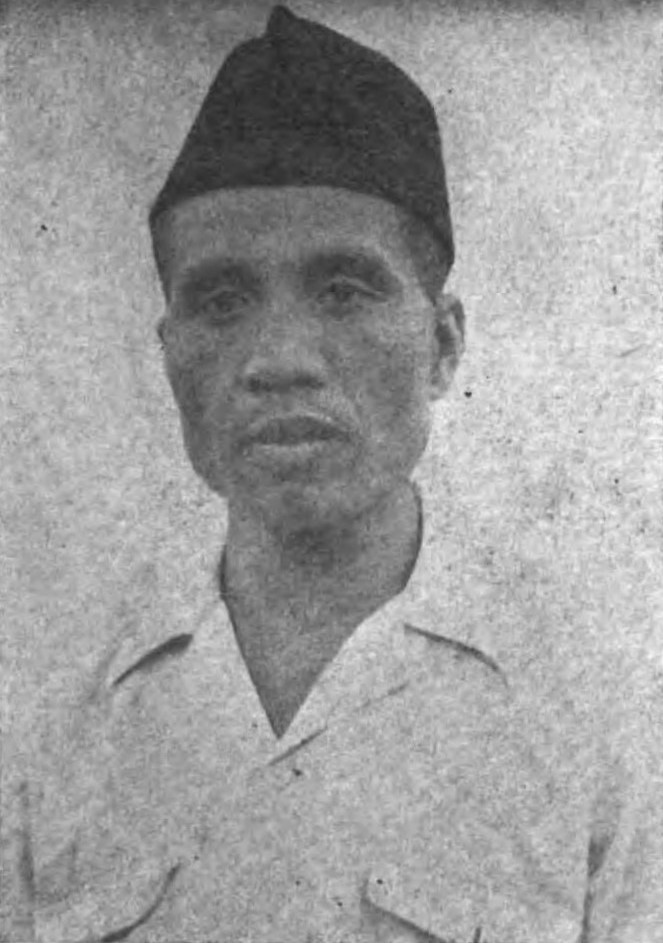
Maskawan, minister of health

== Changes ==
On 14 October 1948, Justice Minister Soeparman died in a car crash during his working trip to Cirebon. He was replaced by Tan Hwat Tiang four days later. Tan concurrently held the position as the Minister of Transportation and Traffic Affairs.

== The end of the cabinet ==
At the midnight of 19 December 1948, the Dutch launched military attack against the Republic of Indonesia. The Adil Cabinet resigned on the same day in protest. Similar event occurred in East Indonesia, on which the Ide Anak Agung Gde Agung cabinet also resigned on the same reason.

The resignation was in pursuance to the promise made by Adil to Mohammad Hatta, the vice president of Indonesia, on 12 December, that he and his cabinet would resign if and only if the Dutch attacked Indonesia.

The outgoing cabinet was officially replaced by the First Djumhana Cabinet on 10 January 1949.

== Bibliography ==
- Toer, Pramoedya Ananta; Toer, Koesalah Soebagyo; Kamil, Ediati (1999), Kronik revolusi Indonesia: 1948, Jakarta: Kepustakaan Populer Gramedia
- Pour, Julius (2009), Doorstoot naar Djokja: pertikaian pemimpin sipil-militer, Jakarta: Kompas
- Government of Pasundan (1949), Satu Tahun Berdirinja Negara Pasundan, Bandung
- Bastiaans, W. Ch. J. (1950), Personalia Van Staatkundige Eenheden (Regering en Volksvertegenwoordiging) in Indonesie (per 1 Sept. 1949) (PDF), Jakarta, archived from the original (PDF) on 2019-10-23
