= Prime Minister of Pasundan =

- Perdana Menteri

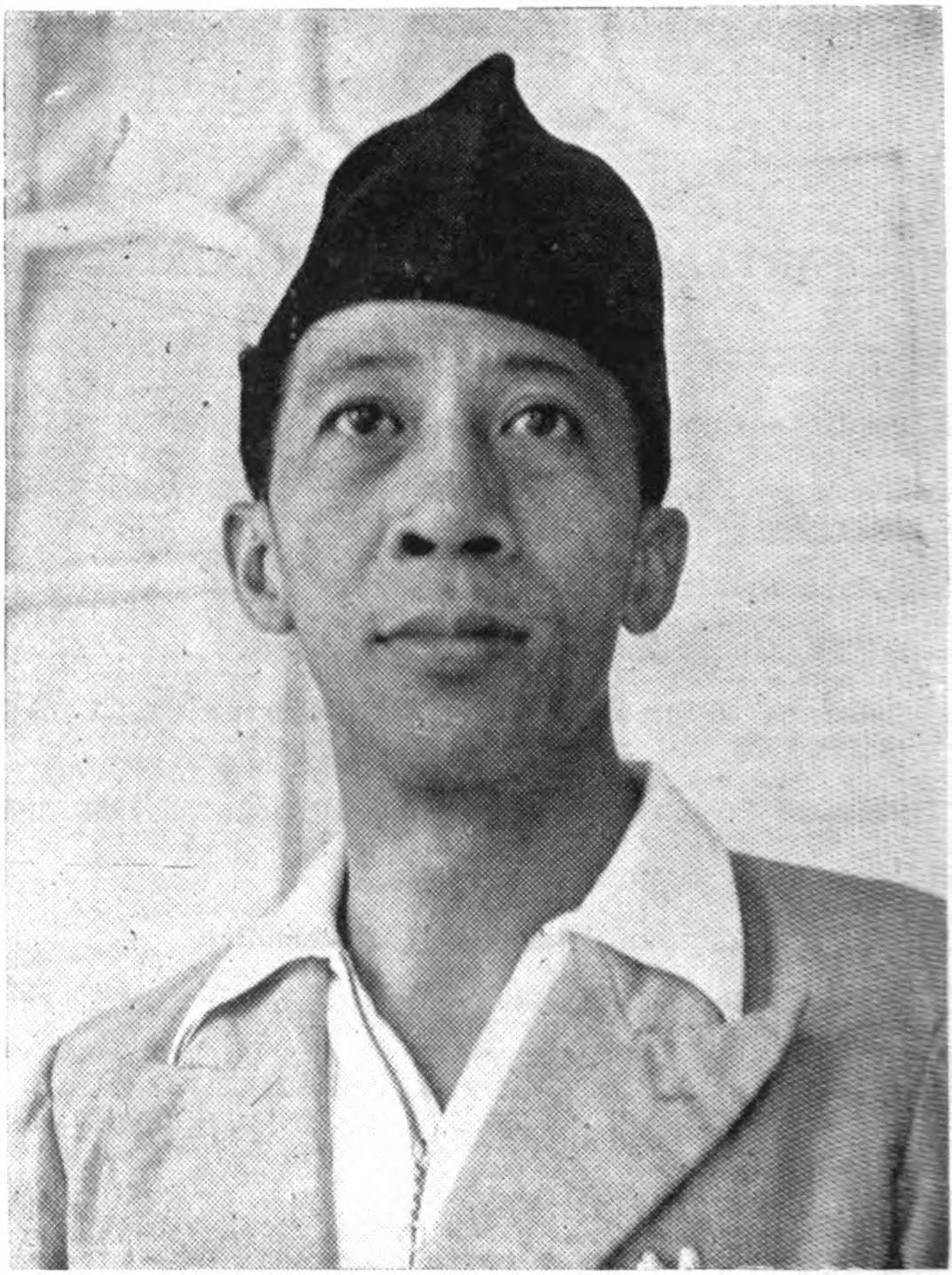
- Last officeholder Anwar Tjokroaminoto; 9 January 1950 – 25 January 1950
- Style: Paduka Yang Mulia
- Member of: Cabinet
- Reports to: Parliament
- Appointer: Wali Negara
- Inaugural holder: Adil Puradiredja
- Formation: 8 May 1948; 78 years ago

The Prime Minister of Pasundan (Indonesian: Perdana Menteri Pasundan) was the head of government and the highest political office in the short-lived State of Pasundan (1948-1950). Appointed by the Wali Negara of Pasundan from among influential Members of Parliament, the Prime Minister was responsible to the Parliament, and his cabinet could be dismissed by a vote of no confidence.

== History ==
After the formation of the State of Pasundan, an election to choose the head of state of Pasundan was held on 28 February 1948. The election was won by Raden Adipati Aria Muharam Wiranatakusumah, and he was installed on 24 April 1948. Wiranatakusumah appointed Adil Puradiredja, a former resident of Priangan Regency, as the prime minister. Adil later formed his cabinet and was installed on 28 February 1948.

Several years later, after the Dutch launched a military attack against the Republic of Indonesia, Adil Puradiredja resigned as the prime minister. The resignation was in pursuance to the promise made by Adil to Mohammad Hatta, the vice president of Indonesia, on 12 December, that he and his cabinet would resign if and only if the Dutch attacked Indonesia. The Dutch failed to pressure the Parliament of Pasundan to support Adil Puradiredja as the Prime Minister. As a result, the commander of the Dutch forces in Indonesia Simon Spoor, and the High Commissioner of the Crown in the State of Pasundan R.W. van Diffelen went to Wiranatakusumah, the Wali Negara (head of state) of Pasundan. They pressured Wiranatakusumah to immediately appoint a new prime minister so that a new government is formed quickly.

On 28 December 1948, Wiranatakusumah appointed Djumhana Wiriaatmadja, a non-party member of the parliament, as the cabinet formateur. Djumhana was officially installed as the prime minister on 10 January 1949. After the recognition of Indonesia by the Dutch government on 27 December 1949, Djumhana resigned as the prime minister. He was officially replaced by Anwar Tjokroaminoto, the deputy chairman of the Indonesian Islamic Union Party, on 11 January 1950.

Following the APRA coup d'état on 23 January 1949, the government of the Republic of Indonesia accused the government of Pasundan for covertly sponsoring the coup. Prime Minister Anwar Tjokroaminoto was arrested on 25 January, and the cabinet was dissolved.

== List of prime ministers of Pasundan ==
Colour key :
Indonesian Nationhood Party (Parki) Independent Indonesian Islamic Union Party (PSII)

Portrait	Name (birth and death)	Term of office		Cabinets	Party	Duration
1	Adil Puradiredja (1907-?)	8 May 1948	10 January 1949	Adil	Parki	247 days
2	Djumhana Wiriaatmadja (1904-1975)	10 January 1949	8 January 1950	Djumhana I	Independent	363 days
2	Djumhana Wiriaatmadja (1904-1975)	10 January 1949	8 January 1950	Djumhana II	Independent	363 days
2	Djumhana Wiriaatmadja (1904-1975)	10 January 1949	8 January 1950	Djumhana III	Independent	363 days
3	Anwar Tjokroaminoto (1909-1975)	9 January 1950	25 January 1950	Anwar	PSII	16 days

== Bibliography ==
- Toer, Pramoedya Ananta; Toer, Koesalah Soebagyo; Kamil, Ediati (1999), Kronik revolusi Indonesia: 1948, Jakarta: Kepustakaan Populer Gramedia
- Pour, Julius (2009), Doorstoot naar Djokja: pertikaian pemimpin sipil-militer, Jakarta: Kompas
- Neale, Robert George (1998), Documents on Australian foreign policy, 1937-49, Volume XV: Indonesia 1949, Australian Government Public Service
- Kahin, George McTurnan (1961), Nationalism and Revolution in Indonesia, Ithaca, New York: Cornell University Press
- People's Representative Council of United States of Indonesia (1950), Pertanjaan Anggota dan Djawaban Pemerintahan Tahun Sidang 1950, Jakarta: Secretariat of the People's Representative Council of United States of Indonesia
- Government of Pasundan (1949), Satu Tahun Berdirinja Negara Pasundan, Bandung
- Bastiaans, W. Ch. J. (1950), Personalia Van Staatkundige Eenheden (Regering en Volksvertegenwoordiging) in Indonesie (per 1 Sept. 1949) (PDF), Jakarta
