= Djumhana Wiriaatmadja =

Sundanese aristocrat and politician

Raden Tumenggung Djumhana Wiriaatmadja
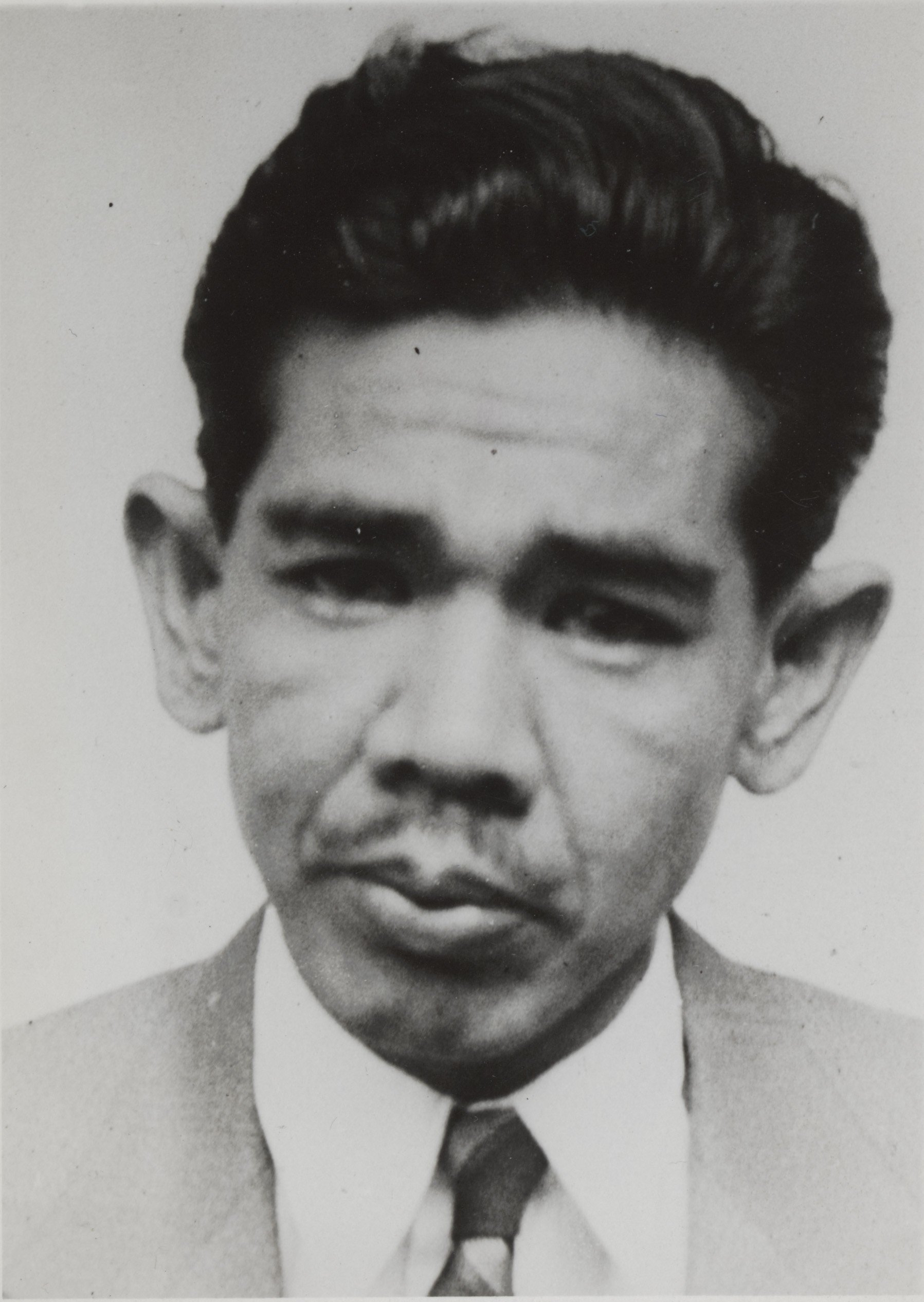

2nd Prime Minister of Pasundan
- In office 10 January 1949 – 8 January 1950
- Wali Negara: Wiranatakusumah
- Preceded by: Adil Puradiredja
- Succeeded by: Anwar Tjokroaminoto

2nd High Commissioner of Indonesia in the Netherlands
- In office 16 September 1950 – 12 February 1952
- President: Sukarno
- Preceded by: Mohammad Roem
- Succeeded by: Susanto Tirtoprodjo

2nd Ambassador of Indonesia to the Holy See
- In office 1952–1954
- President: Sukarno
- Preceded by: Sukarjo Wiryopranoto
- Succeeded by: Alfian Yusuf Helmi

Regent of Pandeglang
- In office 1941–1945
- Preceded by: R.A.A. Wiriaatmadja
- Succeeded by: Tubagus Abdulhalim

Personal details
- Born: 23 February 1904; Cianjur, West Java, Dutch East Indies
- Died: 20 January 1975 (aged 70); Jakarta, Indonesia

Djumhana Wiriaatmadja (EYD: Jumhana Wiriaatmaja, 23 February 1904 – 20 January 1975) was a Sundanese aristocrat, regent, politician, and diplomat.

Born in Cianjur, Djumhana entered law after finished studying in the Rechthogeschool. He began to work as a seconded employee in the district court of Bandung, and later became the regent of Pandeglang. After Indonesia's independence, he was appointed as the cabinet formateur of the State of Pasundan on 28 December 1948 by Wiranatakusumah V, officially being sworn in on 10 January 1949. After the dissolution of the state, he was appointed by the Indonesian government as the ambassador to the Netherlands, Holy See, and Afghanistan.

== Early life ==
Djumhana was born in Cianjur, West Java, then part of the Dutch East Indies, on 23 February 1904.

He studied at the Europeesche Lagere School (European Primary School) and graduated in 1919. He continued his studies at the Hogere Burgerschool (Higher Civic School) and at the Rechtschool (Law School), graduating from the latter in 1926.

== Career ==
=== Dutch East Indies era ===
After graduation, Djumhana worked as a seconded employee in the district court of Bandung. He halted his job for some time to study at the Law Faculty of the Leiden University, receiving the title Mr. (Meester in de Rechten, Master of Laws) in 1931. He continued his career at the government office in Jatinegara in 1931 and as a mantripolitie (a title for indigenous officials) in 1932. He was later appointed as the Asisten Wedana (deputy chief of subdistrict) for Jatinegara from 1934 until 1937, as a Wedana (chief of subdistrict) for Cibadak in 1938, and finally as the Regent of Pandeglang from 1941 until 1945.

In 1923, Djumhana joined the Jong Java (Young Javanese) organization as a commissioner. He retained the position until the merger of the organization to Indonesia Moeda (Young Indonesia) in 1929.

=== Post-independence ===
After the independence of Indonesia, Djumhana became the Head of the Information Bureau of West Java. Sometime later, he was transferred as secretary for the police station in Purwokerto and as one of the deputies for the Committee for Civil Affairs.

He was one of the delegates representing the Republic of Indonesia in the Renville Agreement.

=== Prime Minister of the State of Pasundan ===
==== Appointment and first cabinet ====
Djumhana's appointment as the cabinet formateur of the State of Pasundan was due to the Dutch pressure to the Wali Negara of the State of Pasundan, Wiranatakusumah V. The pressure was due to the resignation of the previous prime minister, Adil Puradiredja. The Dutch failed to pressure the Parliament of Pasundan to reelect Adil as the prime minister.

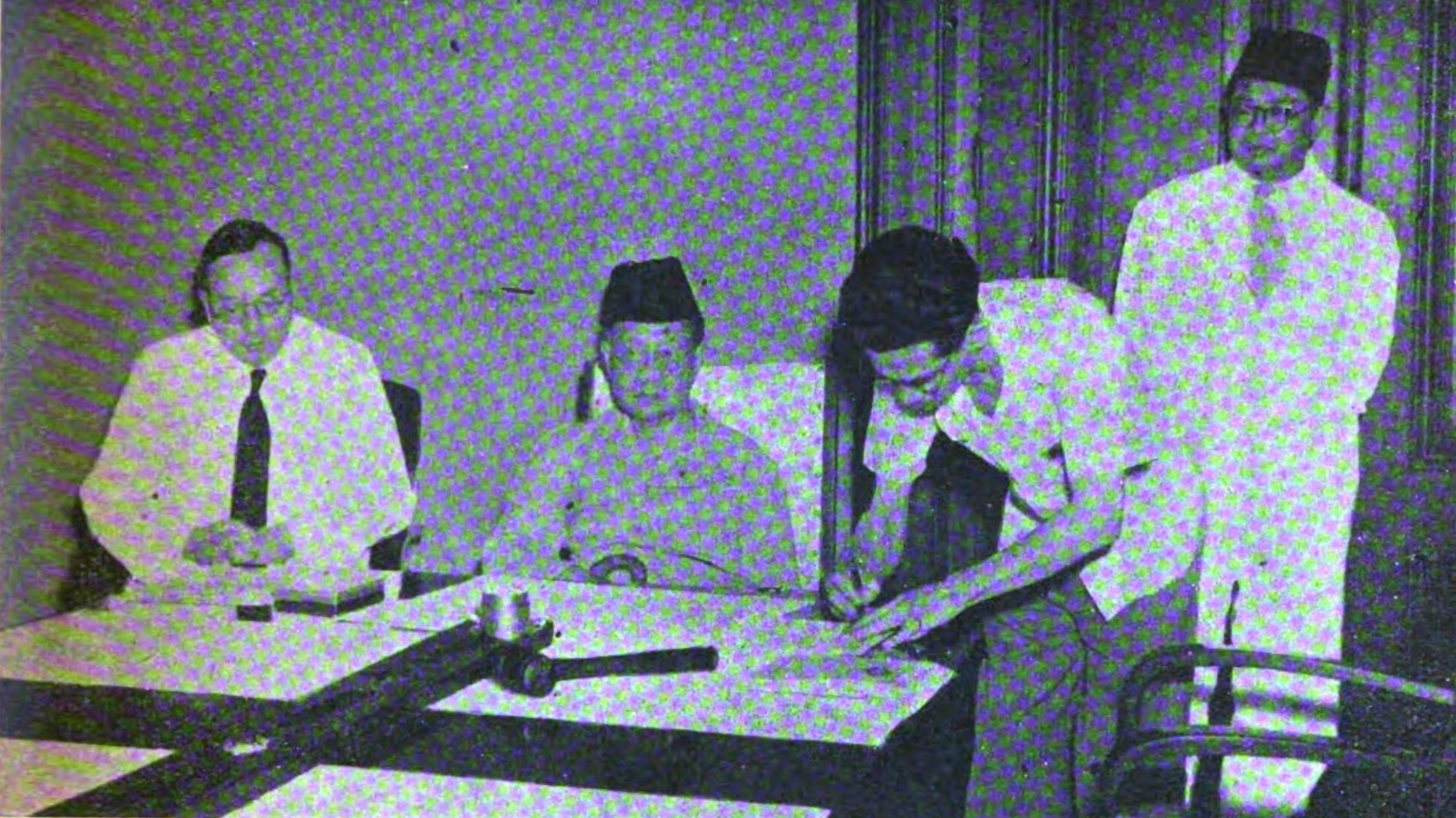
Djumhana signing his oath form as the cabinet formateur of Pasundan on 28 December 1948.

On 28 December 1948, Wiranatakusumah appointed Djumhana Wiriaatmadja, a non-party member of the parliament, as the cabinet formateur.

Based on his program, Djumhana was able to obtain majority parliamentary backing for his cabinet. The Indonesian fraction approved the program but rejected to be given the position in the cabinet.

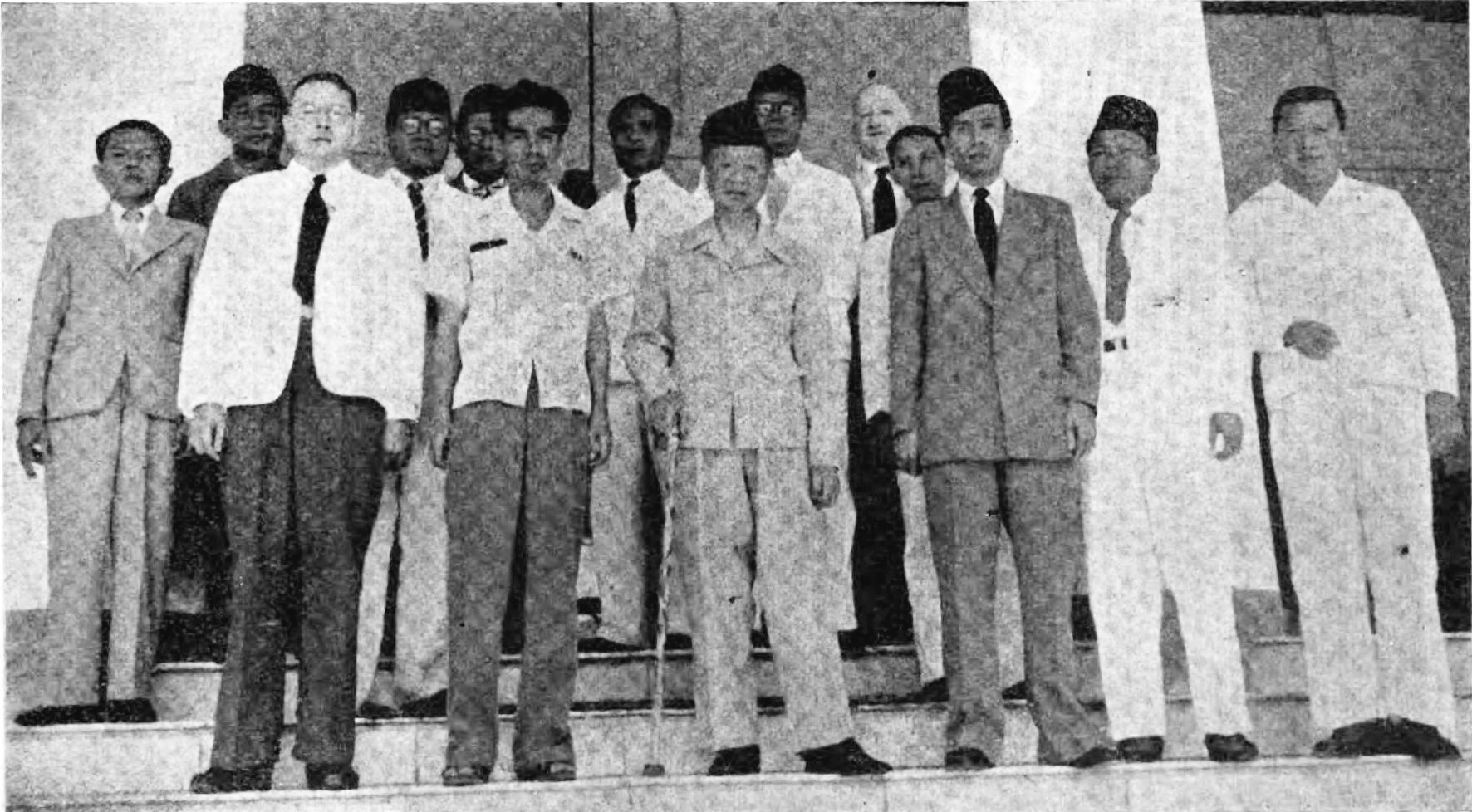
Djumhana's first cabinet, along with the predecessor, Adil Cabinet.

After the formation of the new cabinet, Djumhana headed to Jakarta to attend the conference. It turned out his program was rejected by the Dutch for being pro-Indonesian and the Dutch pressured Djumhana to change his program. Djumhana rejected the request, but he was willing to participate in the talks on Bangka Island with the Indonesian government that was arrested, along with four other members of the federal state.

His first cabinet was dissolved following the arrest of some Pasundan officials on 14 January 1949. The arrest occurred due to the reluctance of Djumhana and Wiranatakusumah to change the program of the cabinet. Later on, the Parliament of Pasundan withdrew its support to the cabinet and four ministers from the cabinet resigned. Djumhana tried in vain for a week to rearrange his cabinet, and on 28 January 1949, his cabinet officially resigned.

==== Second cabinet ====
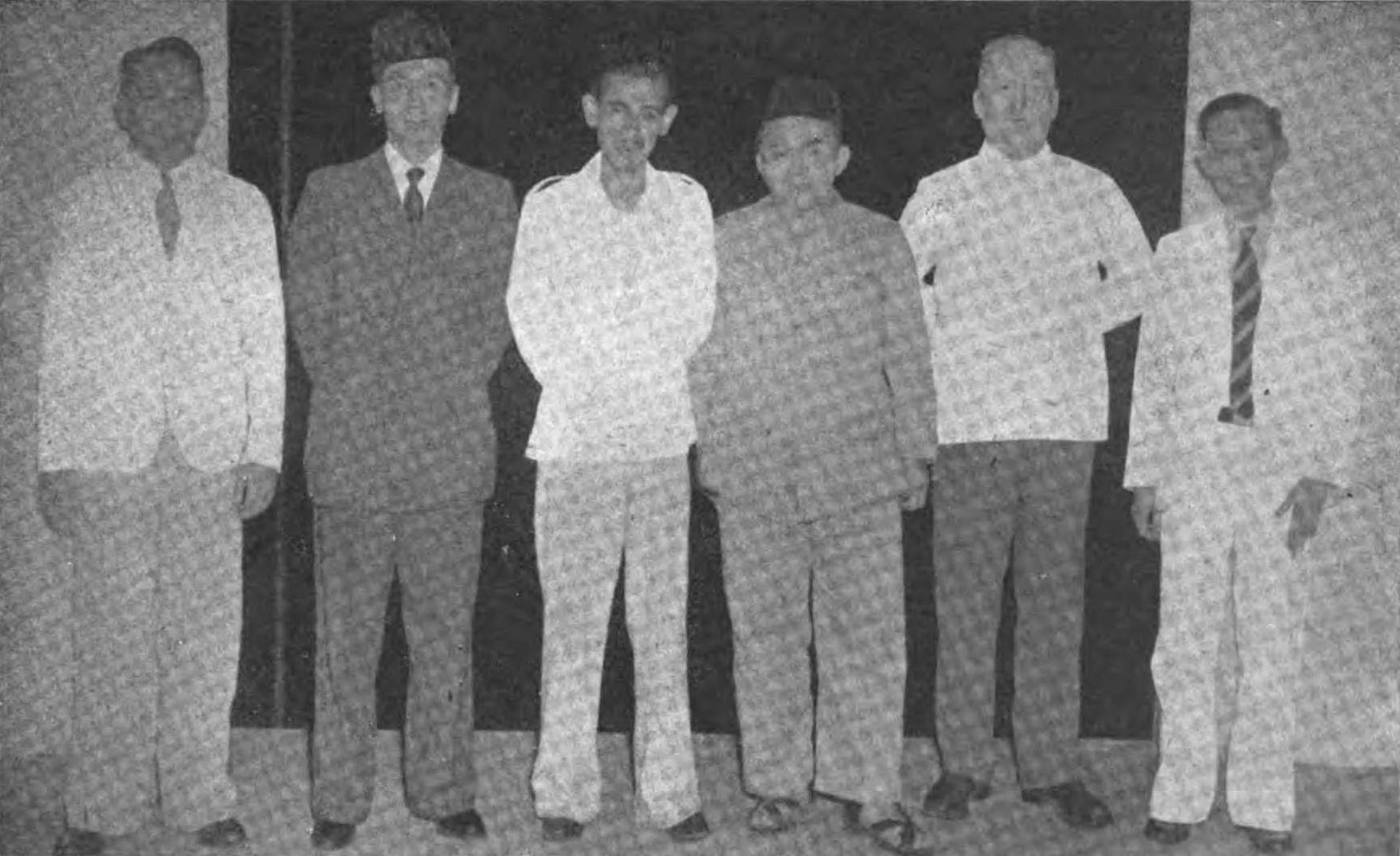
Second Djumhana Cabinet

After the Dutch managed to force the resignation of the First Djumhana Cabinet on 28 January 1949, Djumhana was left with only two ministers. The only way in which Djumhana could form a new cabinet was by dropping his former program. His second cabinet program was to establish a sovereign and free federal Indonesia as soon as possible and form an interim government in which the Republic of Indonesia would take part.

On 18 July 1949, Djumhana's second cabinet resigned after the National Front, a coalition of several political parties in the parliament, demanded the entire cabinet to resign and for the prime minister to form a new cabinet on a broader basis on 16 July 1949.

==== Third cabinet ====
Djumhana's third cabinet was formed on 18 July 1949. It was Djumhana's only cabinet that was formed without the intervention of the Dutch.

He resigned as the prime minister after the formation of the United States of Indonesia on 27 December 1949. He was officially replaced by Anwar Tjokroaminoto on 11 January 1950.

=== Ambassador to the Netherlands, Holy See, and Afghanistan ===
After the return of Indonesia to a unitary state, Djumhana was appointed as the Assistant to the High Commissioner of Indonesia in Netherlands on 1 February 1950, and as the ambassador extraordinary and minister plenipotentiary to the Holy See on 1 February 1952.

At the end of the 1950s, Djumhana was appointed as the ambassador extraordinary and minister plenipotentiary to Afghanistan.

== Death ==
At 12.30 on 20 January 1975, Djumhana died in Jakarta. His remains was buried at the Blok P in Kebayoran Baru.

== Bibliography ==
- Gunseikanbu (1944). Orang Indonesia jang Terkemoeka di Djawa (in Indonesian).
- Bastiaans, W. Ch. J. (1950), Personalia Van Staatkundige Eenheden (Regering en Volksvertegenwoordiging) in Indonesie (per 1 Sept. 1949) (PDF), Jakarta
- Government of Pasundan (1949), Satu Tahun Berdirinja Negara Pasundan, Bandung
- Parliament of Pasundan (2018), Parlemen Negara Pasundan 1949, Bandung: Bandong
- Helius, Sjamsuddin; Ekadjati, Edi S.; Marlina, Kuswiah; Wiwi, Ietje (1992), Menuju Negara Kesatuan: Negara Pasundan, Jakarta: Ministry of Education and Culture
- Kahin, George McTurnan (1961), Nationalism and Revolution in Indonesia, Ithaca, New York: Cornell University Press
