= Anwar Tjokroaminoto =

Co-Founder of the United Development Party (c. 1909 – 1975

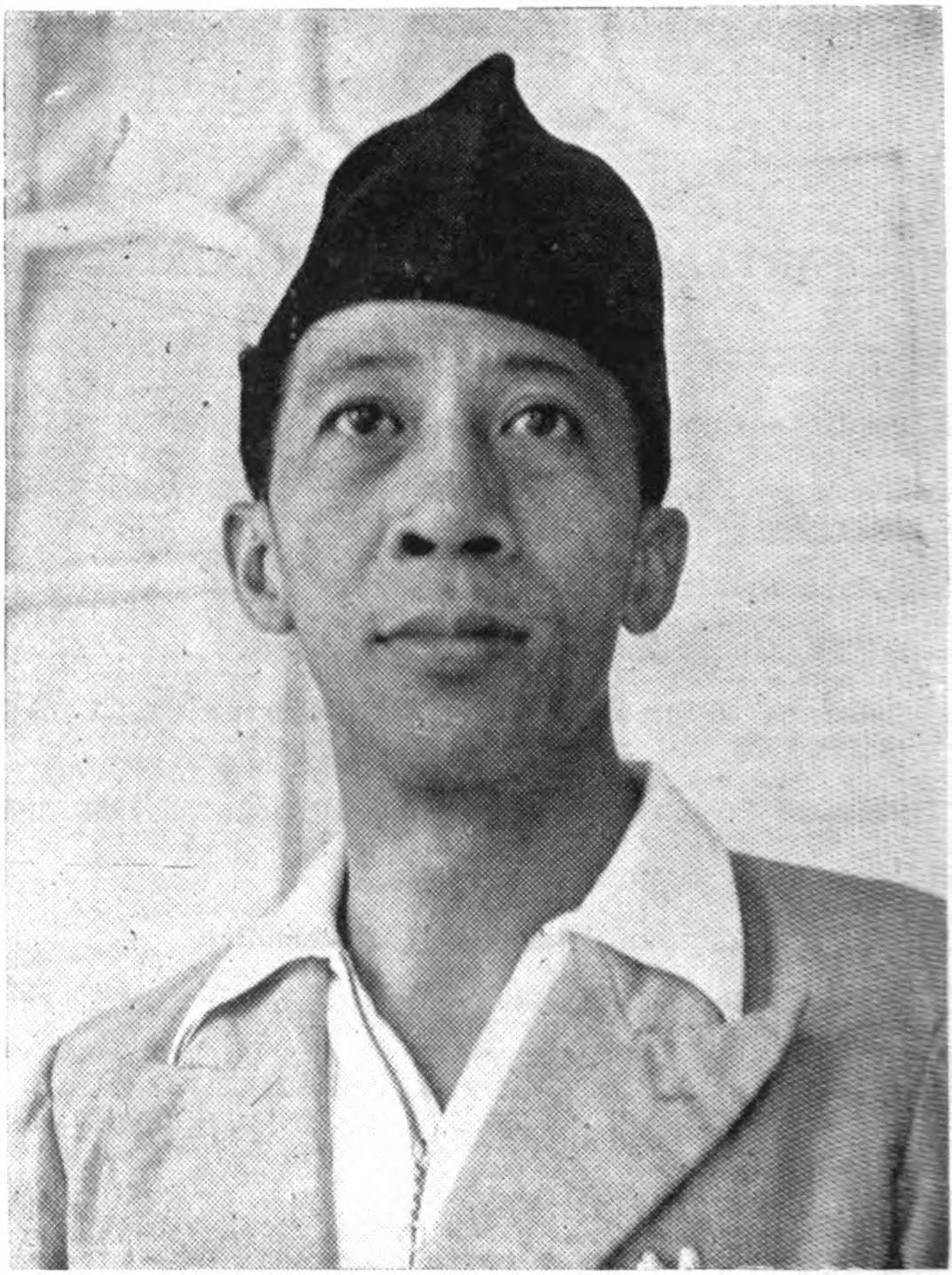
- Tjokroaminoto, 1954

Member of the Supreme Advisory Council
- In office 1966 – 16 November 1975
- Chairman: Sukarno; Wilopo

10th Minister of Social Affairs
- In office 1 April 1952 – 11 May 1953
- Prime Minister: Wilopo
- Preceded by: Sjamsuddin Sutan Makmur
- Succeeded by: Soeroso

3rd Prime Minister of Pasundan
- In office 9 January 1950 – 23 January 1950
- Wali Negara: Wiranatakusumah V
- Preceded by: Djumhana Wiriaatmadja
- Succeeded by: Position abolished

Member of People's Representative Council
- In office 26 March 1956 – 22 July 1959
- Constituency: South Sumatera
- In office 15 February 1950 – 1 April 1952

Personal details
- Born: Oetarjo Anwar Tjokroaminoto; 3 May 1909 Surabaya, Dutch East Indies
- Died: 16 November 1975 (aged 66)
- Party: PPP (1973–1975)
- Other political affiliations: Masyumi (1945–1947); PSII (1947–1973)
- Parent: Oemar Said Tjokroaminoto (father)
- Known for: Co-founder of Kaaba Party

Oetarjo Anwar Tjokroaminoto (3 May 1909 – 16 November 1975) was an Indonesian politician and journalist. He was one of the Founding Fathers of the United Development Party. He also served as Minister of Social Affairs for a year in the Wilopo Cabinet and was the Prime Minister of Pasundan for less than a month in 1950.

Son of Indonesian nationalist and Sarekat Islam founder H.O.S. Tjokroaminoto, he studied journalism in his youth and for some time worked in schools affiliated with his father's political party PSII before working for newspapers. He worked for the Asia Raya newspaper during the Japanese occupation period, and he was also managing editor for Pemandangan. After Indonesian independence, Tjokroaminoto entered politics through the Masyumi Party, serving briefly as a minister before moving to PSII. He was part of the government of the State of Pasundan and was appointed prime minister, though suspicions after the APRA coup d'état resulted in Pasundan's dissolution shortly afterward.

Tjokroaminoto then rejoined the government as a legislator, and by 1952 he obtained a cabinet post as Minister of Social Affairs in the Wilopo Cabinet where he was reshuffled after a year. PSII later fractured in 1972, and Tjokroaminoto became a leader in one of the two competing factions until he died in 1975.

== Early life and education ==
Oetarjo Anwar Tjokroaminoto was born in Surabaya on 3 May 1909, as the second child and eldest son of Oemar Said Tjokroaminoto. He was educated in Dutch schools (an ELS and a MULO) before later enrolling at Douwes Dekker's Teacher's Training School, where he studied journalism and graduated in 1940. Additionally, he also studied at pesantren in Rembang and Garut.

== Career ==
=== Pre-1945 ===
Between 1930 and 1935, he taught at Sarekat Islam schools, starting in Batavia before he moved to Sumatra where he was principal at a school in Menggala and the chief supervisor for SI schools in Southern Sumatra. After this career in education, he moved back to Jakarta in 1936, where he became the managing editor for the Pembangoenan daily newspaper. He worked at this newspaper until the Japanese invasion of the Indies. In 1941, Tjokroaminoto was also working at the Pemandangan newspaper as managing editor.

In the immediate aftermath of the Japanese invasion and seizure of the Indies, Tjokroaminoto wrote essays in support of the Japanese. In April 1942, he also voiced his support in Pemandangan for the shift of time zones in Java to fit Tokyo and in an essay of May 1942, titled Lebih Loeas Lagi (Broader Still), he supported the Japanese-sponsored ideology of Pan-Asianism, though with a strong influence of Islamism. During the Japanese occupation period, Tjokroaminoto worked at the Japanese-sponsored newspaper Asia Raya as deputy chief editor. According to Tan Malaka, during Tjokroaminoto's time at Asia Raya he wrote popular satirical articles portraying Japan's occupation in a negative light under the pen name "Bang Bedjat" (Mr Pervert). Later on, Tjokroaminoto joined a political liaison group of other nationalist youths led by his colleague at Asia Raya, B.M. Diah.

=== Revolution ===
During the Indonesian National Revolution, Tjokroaminoto joined the Masyumi Party as one of its leaders at the party's founding, though he did not have a specific title within the leadership structure. In September 1945, he co-founded the National Publishing Company, along with other journalists such as Adam Malik and Sumanang. He was then appointed to the "Army Political Education Staff" and was given a nominal rank of major general, despite having no military experience. While being attached to the military, he acted as chief editor of the army news magazine.

He was later honorably discharged from his military assignment, and afterward, he returned to journalism for some time, managing the al-Djihad daily newspaper. He joined the Second Amir Sjarifuddin Cabinet as a minister of state in 1947, without a portfolio. During this period, the Indonesian Islamic Union Party (PSII) split away from Masyumi, and Tjokroaminoto became one of its leaders alongside his brother Harsono Tjokroaminoto.

=== Post-revolution ===
On 9 January 1950, Tjokroaminoto was appointed as the Prime Minister of Pasundan, replacing Djumhana Wiriaatmadja who had resigned. Within the month, however, the APRA coup d'état led by Raymond Westerling rocked Jakarta, and the United States of Indonesia government immediately suspected the State of Pasundan's government as having supported Westerling, leading to the arrest of Tjokroaminoto and his cabinet and eventually the dissolution of Pasundan. Despite this arrest, he joined the newly formed DPR-RIS as a legislator and retained his seat following the defederalization of the state.

By 1952, however, Tjokroaminoto had been appointed as Minister of Social Affairs under the Wilopo Cabinet. In May 1953, due to political tensions between PSII and Wilopo in the aftermath of the 17 October Affair, Tjokroaminoto was withdrawn from the cabinet, and he was later replaced by R.P. Soeroso. Tjokroaminoto won a legislator seat representing South Sumatra in the 1955 legislative election.

In 1966, the last year of Sukarno's presidency, Tjokroaminoto criticized the government's (Dwikora Cabinet) foreign policy, especially under foreign minister Subandrio. His statement pointed at Indonesia's isolation internationally (due to the Indonesia–Malaysia confrontation), in addition to heavy deficits and inflation. He then called for the formation of a proper representative cabinet, instead of the interim cabinet then.

Within PSII, Tjokroaminoto's political position had been eroded due to perceived dynastic politics, and poor performance in the 1971 legislative election culminating in his removal as chairman in July 1972. In the ensuing internal party conflict, PSII (then merged with other Islamic parties to form the United Development Party in 1973 with Anwar recorded as one of the founders, leaving the original Sarekat Islam organization) was fractured into two organizations, one of which was led by Tjokroaminoto and Thayeb Mohammad Gobel and was more favoured by the incumbent New Order administration.

In 1973, he was sworn in as a member of the Supreme Advisory Council.

Tjokroaminoto died on 16 November 1975.

== Bibliography ==
- Anderson, Benedict Richard O'Gorman (1972). Java in a Time of Revolution: Occupation and Resistance, 1944-1946. Cornell University Press. ISBN 978-0-8014-0687-4.
- Feith, Herbert (1962). The Decline of Constitutional Democracy in Indonesia. Cornell University Press. ISBN 0-80-140126-7.
- Feith, Herbert (2009). The Wilopo Cabinet, 1952-1953: A Turning Point in Post-Revolutionary Indonesia. Equinox Publishing. ISBN 978-602-8397-15-5.
- Fogg, Kevin W. (2019). Indonesia's Islamic Revolution. Cambridge University Press. ISBN 978-1-108-48787-0.
- Mark, Ethan (2018). Japan's Occupation of Java in the Second World War: A Transnational History. Bloomsbury Publishing. ISBN 978-1-350-02221-8.
- Subekti, Valina Singka (2014). Partai Syarikat Islam Indonesia: Konstestasi Politik hingga Konflik Kekuasaan Elite (in Indonesian). Yayasan Pustaka Obor Indonesia. ISBN 978-979-461-859-2.
