= Brush Farm =

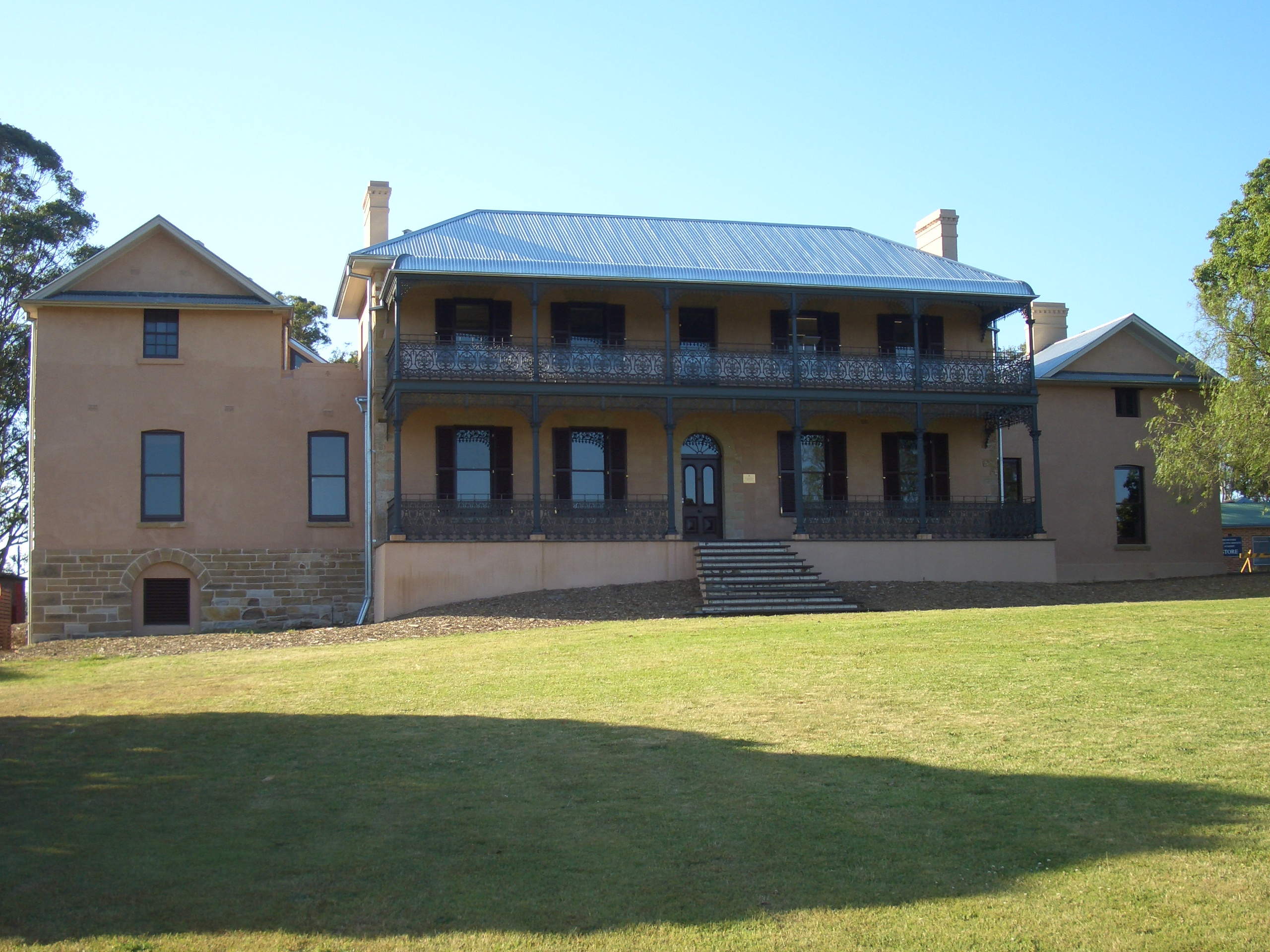
- Brush Farm House, 2007

- Location within Sydney Location within Australia
- 33°47′34″S 151°04′01″E
- Location: Marsden Road, Eastwood, City of Ryde, New South Wales, Australia

History
- Built: 1794–1894

Site notes
- Owner: City of Ryde

New South Wales Heritage Register
- Official name: Brush Farm; Home for Boys; Eastwood Home for Mothers and Babies; Brush Farm Home for Mentally Deficient Children Brush Farm Girls' Home
- Type: State heritage (complex / group)
- Designated: 2 April 1999
- Reference no.: 612
- Type: Homestead Complex
- Category: Farming and Grazing

Brush Farm is a heritage-listed former farm, residence and vineyard and now tourist attraction, community facility, exhibition venue and meeting venue at Marsden Road, Eastwood, New South Wales, a suburb of Sydney, Australia. It was built from 1794 to 1894. It is also known as Home for Boys, Eastwood Home for Mothers and Babies and Brush Farm Home for Mentally Deficient Children, and Brush Farm Girls' Home. The property is owned by City of Ryde. It was added to the New South Wales State Heritage Register on 2 April 1999.

== History ==
Early European accounts of settlement in the Ryde area would indicate that the area on the northern side of the Parramatta River extending from Sydney Cove to Parramatta was that of the Wallumedegal, the territory of the Wallumede people, with the Aboriginal name Wallumetta. The Wallumedegal clan is thought to have been a clan of the Dharug speaking area. The Ryde area was highly suitable for farming and orchards, and early grants to marines were given by Governor Phillip to encourage agriculture. The military association with the area prompted Phillip to name it "Field of Mars", a reference to the Roman God of war.

In 1792 land in the area was granted to eight marines; two of the grants were in the modern area of Ryde. Isaac Archer and John Colethread each received 32 hectares (80 acres) of land on the site of the present Ryde-Parramatta Golf Links, now in West Ryde. Later in 1792, in the Eastern Farms area, twelve grants, most of them about 12 hectares (30 acres), were made to convicts. Much later these farms were bought by John Macarthur, Gregory Blaxland and the Reverend Samuel Marsden. The district remained an important orchard area throughout the 19th century.

Brush Farm was part of a land grant made in 1794 (in two adjoining lots, one (north) to Zadoc Pettit, the other (south) to Thomas Bride, both privates in the NSW Corps) which was acquired by William Cox in 1801–3, adding them to adjoining property to consolidate his land holdings an estate of over 200 hectares (500 acres), named Brush Farm. Misuse of regimental funds saw Cox deported to England and his estate transferred to a number of prominent local citizens who acted as Cox's trustees and administered the sale of his property.

184 hectares (455 acres) of Cox's estate was acquired by D'Arcy Wentworth in 1805 and then by Gregory Blaxland in 1807. Blaxland was a free settler who arrived in 1806 from Kent, where his family had lived since St. Augustine's time, on an estate called "Newington". Gregory was less sociable than his brother John, who arrived in the colony in 1807.

When Gregory Blaxland and his older brother, John decided in 1804 to emigrate to New South Wales they both negotiated with the British government for grants of land of their own choosing, an assignment of convicts and passage for their families and stock. In return, they would become permanent settlers and take with them a stipulated amount of money. The Blaxlands were from a wealthy family. Sir Joseph Banks was a family friend and from him the brothers learned that NSW needed high-quality, free settlers. John negotiated to receive 2,400 hectares (6,000 acres), 60 "useful convicts...for 18 months", passage for himself and family and six Spanish sheep. He committed to invest not less than 6000 pounds in the colony. Gregory's terms were half of John's as he had managed to raise only A£3,000. It was decided Gregory would sail first and he and his wife, Elizabeth, their three children, two female servants and one overseer departed on the "William Pitt" on 4 August 1805, arriving in Sydney on 11 April 1806.

Gregory Blaxland was a skilled Kentish farmer when he came to NSW, leasing "The Vineyard" at Rydalmere (formerly leased to Lt. William Cox, paymaster of the NSW Corps) with a flourishing vineyard. Within a year, he had entered an agreement with D'Arcy Wentworth, then the government surgeon at Parramatta, to buy the original nine farms consisting of 185 hectares (460 acres) of land known as Brush Farm and previously owned by William Cox.

In 1807 Blaxland bought Brush Farm and moved there in 1808. One of his early projects was planting a vineyard near his home in the Dundas Valley (west of today's Marsden Road). Here he collected grape vines from all around the colony that were healthy and bore good fruit. Most of these were "Constantia" (Black Muscat).

The Blaxland brothers were expected by Governor Macquarie to apply their considerable knowledge of farming to the cultivation of grain. However their commercial interests were in cattle and sheep, which Macquarie regarded as a lazy pursuit. He failed to appreciate they had supplied the government stores with 40,096 kilograms (88,396 lb) weight of fresh meat over a period of nearly three years, for A£3,287, cutting the price of meat from 2/6 per pound to 1/- per pound. Gregory continued expanding his land holdings west of Sydney, but a drought in 1812 made him and other cattlemen dissatisfied with their relatively small land holdings. This, and the challenge of the mountains that swept down within a few miles of his South Creek farm, probably helped stir Gregory into action. He had spoken to many of the explorers who had already attempted to find a route through the mountains and was aware of reasons for their failure.

In 1813 Blaxland, in company with Lt. William Lawson and William Charles Wentworth (D'Arcy Wentworth's son, then just 22 years old), with four men, five dogs and four horses loaded with provisions, made the first successful crossing of the Blue Mountains by European settlers. On their return Blaxland called on Governor Macquarie to tell him of the expedition's success. On 12 February 1814 Macquarie issued a General Order acknowledging the discovery and granting each of the explorers 400 hectares (1,000 acres) in the newly discovered country. At about this time the Blaxland brothers decided to terminate their partnership and run their own businesses.

During his trip to NSW in 1805–06, Gregory had obtained grape vine cuttings at several of the ports where the ship stopped. These he planted at Rydalmere shortly after arrival and he also looked out for high-performing grapevines already planted that could be used for winemaking. Grape cuttings or seeds had been collected by the First Fleet at both Rio de Janeiro and the Cape of Good Hope on their outward (1788) journey and some were successfully grown at Government House. The variety Gregory found most suitable was called "Black Constantia" (a Muscat variety. Years later, Gregory changed the location of the vineyard to an area close to Brush Farm House. Here he planted two new varieties which he thought to be Claret grapes. They were probably Pinor Noir and Pinot Meunier. He had also raised new vines from seeds, and pursued his interest in growing hops and brewing beer.

Blaxland, after setbacks, produced tolerable wine in 1816 from Brush Farm, sending a sample of his wine to Governor Macquarie that he described as "little better than water" and later another sample that he thought much better. By this time Gregory and Elizabeth had seven children – two girls and five boys and the house was scarcely adequate.

In 1816, the Royal Society for the Arts in England offered medals for wine from New South Wales. As early as that year, Blaxland was sending wine to Governor Macquarie to keep him informed about the possibility of an Australian wine industry.

Blaxland set about creating the estate as an agricultural enterprise and by 1817 was successfully producing meat and livestock and had established a distillery for the production of wine and vinegar. He was a founding member of the first (later the Royal) Agricultural Society of NSW, his name being recorded on a board in the Society's headquarters (McClymont, 2008, scribed by and pers.comm., Stuart Read). A 1919 Royal Agricultural Society plaque honouring twelve agricultural pioneers includes Blaxland along with Sir Joseph Banks, John Macarthur, Samuel Marsden, James Busby, Alexander Berry and others. He introduced buffalo grass (Cynodon dactylon) into the colony, a valuable grass for cattle fodder (and as an ornamental turf, retaining its green in both hot summers and winters, when many tropical grasses die off.

Probably before 1819 (beginning of constructing today's Brush Farm House), he planted another vineyard on the steep slopes of the escarpment (south of Brush Farm house and east of today's Marsden Road, part today of Brush Farm Park). This required terracing and he used knowledge gleaned from his earlier Madeira stop over. In this vineyard, he planted other grape varieties including Shiraz and Pinot, wine grapes from France. Blaxland certainly knew of the grape varieties brought back to Australia in 1817 by John, James and William Macarthur and of their plantings at Camden Park, although their first vintage was not until 1824. Not far from the house, remnants of the early vineyard terracing can still be located.

In 1821 Blaxland had three and a half acres under vines at Brush Farm.

Blaxland built Brush Farm house (the second on the farm, the first being a more modest structure down the gully to the west of the current Brush Farm house) in 1820. A shale mine/quarry on the farm probably produced cement mortar used in construction of the house. The central core of the house was built c. 1819–20 (Buttrey, 2006 (38) says 1819–21, noting the original house was a four-room, two storey dwelling with entrance hall and upper hall, on sandstone foundations with brick walls, over a cellar), east and west wings added during the 1820s with stables and outbuildings, landscaped grounds with a carriage loop. For many years, due to its elevated position, a site on the property was used as a signal station to relay messages on ship arrivals at South Head. These were relayed via Observatory Hill and Gladesville to Government House at Parramatta.

In 1822 Blaxland took 390 litres (86 imp gal) of wine in two casks on the "Royal George" to England. Some of the wine was to be submitted to the Royal Society for the Arts in England, which was offering a medal for the finest wine made from New South Wales grapes. Blaxland's wine was awarded a silver medal in 1823 as the finest wine to have been produced in NSW at the time. The medal is now held in the Mitchell Library. He could be said to have exported the first commercial quantity of wine from Australia and was an enthusiastic promoter of an Australian wine industry. Governor Phillip had previously exported a small quantity of wine, likely made by Phillip Schaeffer from Parramatta in 1791.

Five years later in 1828 he did the same (leaving his 24-year-old son, George in charge of Brush Farm), Gregory took a pipe of wine (105 gallons) and won a Gold Ceres medal at the Society's 1828 awards. That medal is now held in the Mitchell Library. Blaxland's Brush Farm was once considered the finest vineyard in the colony. Robert Townson's Varroville estate at Minto was once described as 'the finest orchard in the colony and a vineyard second only to Gregory Blaxland's'.

The gully south of the present Lawson Street and the house had a school building, a barn, later a stables. Further down the gully was an orchard. Small vineyards were located in two separate gullies, one to the west (Dundas) of the house. Landscape consultant Geoffrey Britton has identified two areas of terracing by doing aerial photographic analysis, one south of the house within today's Brush Farm Park, the other to its south-west, west of Marsden Road.

In 1825 James Busby wrote the first of a number of books on viticulture and wine making. In 1833, he brought 437 grape cuttings back to NSW and made these widely available (through the Botanic Gardens, Sydney). Busby, who had been trained in vineyard management, grape varieties and wine making in France, referred to Mr Blaxland's vineyard as being a showplace in the Sydney Basin. He commented on the generosity of Blaxland to share his knowledge and cuttings from his vineyard. Cuttings from Brush Farm provided early vines for Wyndham Estate (at Dalwood) in the Hunter Valley. It was not until the 1830s that William Macarthur sent 34,000 vines to the Barossa Valley in South Australia, to begin the wine industry in that state.

In 1829 the signal station and One Tree Hill was discontinued. This was understood from official correspondence to have been located on Blaxland's land c.1826. A signal station operated from the property to Gregory's brother John Blaxland's farm at Newington, Silverwater, across the Parramatta River. This was one of a system of signal stations along the Harbour and River promontories and high points. Early photographs of Brush Farm show a clear view to the Parramatta River from the house (McClymont, 2008, scribed by Stuart Read).

Between 1831 and 1835 the property was listed as One Tree Hill in the NSW Calendar and GPO Directory. In 1831 Blaxland moved out at age 53 in acute financial difficulties, selling to his son-in-law, Thomas Forster (a surgeon in the British Army) for 1500 pounds and moving to a leased vineyard in North Parramatta. Forster carried on the tradition of viticulture and wine making on the Brush Farm estate.

In 1844 the property was leased to his son, William Forster, for 40 years. On Thomas' death in 1856, the estate passed to William Forster, Gregory Blaxland's grandson who was NSW Premier from 1856 to 1860.

In 1881 the property was mortgaged to Lancelot Trekeld and John Bennett, and subsequently subdivided and portions sold between 1882 and 1886.

John Bennett was a theatrical entrepreneur with an interest in horse racing. He founded and developed Rosehill Racecourse and the railway line between Clyde and Rose Hill. Bennett acquired Brush Farm (then a large amount of land) seeing an opportunity, owing to its proximity to the Northern Railway Line (from Strathfield to Hornsby) and particularly to that line's Eastwood station. Bennett's wife Emma acquired that portion which contained the house and outbuildings. A number of alterations were made to the house at this time, including the front verandah. Around 1883 the Victorian-era extensions were added to the house. The subdivision of the estate began about this time. Also at this time the carriage loop south of the house was prominent in photographs of the estate, with a 30-centimetre (12 in) raised rim, made of stone.

In 1894 Emma Bennett leased her portion to the Crown: it is thought to have been occupied at this time by the State Children's Relief Board and operated as the Carpentarian Reformatory for Boys. It was used for boys formerly held on the 'Sobraon' an old clipper ship used to house wayward and homeless boys, moored at Cockatoo Island. The boys brought their hammocks off the ship to Brush Farm.

They were trained in mariners' skills, agriculture, farming, and tin smithing and blacksmithing. The Carpentarian Reformatory's name was after Margaret Carpenter an English woman well known for her care for children (McClymont, 2008, scribed by Stuart Read).

In 1904 the property was resumed by the State Government and continued to be used as a reformatory for boys until 1913 when the facility (Farm Home for Boys) was transferred to Mount Penang near Gosford). In the meantime the rest of the Bennett family land holdings in the area were subdivided and sold leaving about 1000 square metres of land around Brush Farm House (cf an original 184 hectares (455 acres)). After the boys left the property was used for wayward girls from c.1911, with the transfer of the boys taking a few years and the transfer of the girls similarly over time. Buttrey (2006, 38) adds that this was a home for single mothers and delinquent girls, and later still a home for handicapped children.

In 1918 the Eastwood Home for Mothers and Babies opened at Brush Farm and operated until 1921 when the complex became the Brush Farm Home for Mentally Deficient Children, and subsequently Brush Farm Home in 1946.

Community bush regeneration of the gullies to the south of Brush Farm House (on the former estate) has been ongoing since the 1970s. In the later 20th century the Department of Youth and Community Services' era, the garden was less intensively managed and cared for, and the carriage loop south of the house was grassed over and obscured (McClymont, 2008, scribed by Stuart Read).

In 1988 the property was transferred to the Department of Corrective Services and as the Brush Farm Corrective Services Academy, offers training for corrections officers.

In 1990 the land (Brush Farm House and its present reduced curtilage) was bought by Ryde Municipal Council from the Department of Corrective Services. Council began restoration of the house in May 2006, at an estimated cost of over $5m. Funds came from Council, state and federal government sources.

With time the place's heritage values became increasingly valued. In 1999 the property was listed on the State Heritage Register. In 2003 it was listed on Ryde Local Environmental Plan 105.

In 2005 Ryde City Council commenced a major heritage restoration programme of works on Brush Farm House as a community venue. The house was officially opened on 7 April 2007. Council intend to use the building as a centre for cultural and community events, including art exhibitions, meetings and wedding functions (McClymont, 2008, scribed by Stuart Read).

The stands of timber and grasslands in the surrounding parks are remnants of Brush Farm Park.

In 2007 the Brush Farm & District Historical Society was awarded a NSW Heritage Volunteer Award. The Society has been the driving force behind the conservation and reopening of Brush Farm Estate to the public this year after a 15-year campaign. The Society was formed in the 1980s to encourage study of local history with a special focus on Brush Farm Estate, which was acquired by Ryde Council in 1992. The Society has prepared several publications on the history of Eastwood and the Blaxland family and has contributed to the Heritage Festival and the Granny Smith Festival, always striving to educate the public on the significance of Brush Farm and its contribution to the history of NSW. The group organises public lectures about local history, collects documents and artefacts associated with the property and promotes the interpretation of Brush Farm House to the wider community through school group tours and open days.

In 2008 and 2009, a landscape plan allowing partial reinstatement of Brush Farm House's pleasure garden, reinstatement of its carriage drive and loop before the house, modified car parking behind the house, new fencing and plantings was approved and implemented. This includes a timber platform behind the house on which a marquee can be placed for future functions. The house has progressively been opened up for community uses, including art and heritage exhibitions, meetings, tours. Council intends promoting part of the upstairs as "start-up business" spaces for small enterprises.

== Description ==
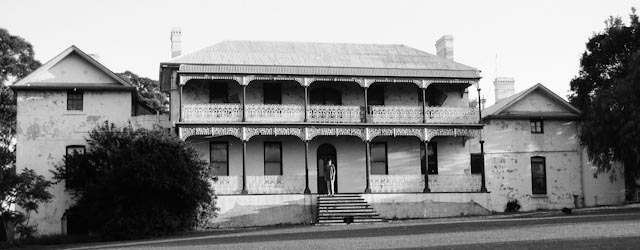
Brush Farm House, 1999

Brush Farm House is on the Corner Lawson Street and Marsden Road. It is a rare early colonial mansion and remnant farm in the Ryde area. Although the site is owned by Ryde City Council, it is part of a much larger adjacent site owned by the Department of Corrective Services. The house and other buildings on site share a common entry and access. Originally the house was on a much larger site including a part of Eastwood suburb, Dundas, Lambert & Brush Farm Parks to the south to Victoria Road.

=== Modifications and dates ===
4 July 2006 update:

The restoration program for Brush Farm House commenced in December 2004, Key milestones achieved:

- Tanner Architects and other consultants engaged in February 2005 to undertake design documentation work
- Stakeholder workshop in March 2005
- Statutory approvals and detail design documentation complete December 2005
- Tender for conservation and adaptation work awarded in April 2006 to Sydney Building Projects Pty Ltd
- Conservation and adaptation works commenced in May 2006
- Successful in receiving a grant of $500,000 under the National Heritage Investment Initiative Program from the Australian Government.

Progress

Phase 1 works (west wing, central wing, new roof over the entire building, rear verandah, front verandah and balcony) commenced on 1 May 2006 and due for completion by February 2007. The contractor made good progress over the last 9 weeks. Works completed include:

- Temporary fencing, temporary toilets
- Demolition works, excavation works, stripping of floor boards
- Repair and reconstruction of the floor structure in both the first floor and ground floor and roof structure
- Installation of partitions for toilets on ground floor
- Installation of the new sewer line
- Construction of the footings and brick walls for the rear verandah
- Archaeological investigations – Internal completed and external in progress. No archaeological remains found to date
- Works to commence over the coming weeks include:
- Construction of toilets on ground and first floor
- Construction of new stairs and rear verandah,
- Installation of hydraulic services, mechanical services and electrical services
- Erection of scaffolding for roof replacement
- Council has resolved, with the approval of $500,000 grant from the Federal Government, to complete the whole building. Phase 2 works (East wing and Hall) will be completed by April 2007.
- Use of basement and cellar area to be investigated
- Use of remaining space in the first floor and ground floor to be investigated
- Unused old building materials of historic value will be retained.

=== Further information ===
- June 2006: $500,000 approved for works: extensive repairs, restoration and stabilisation to the fabric and structure of the building, to address its seriously deteriorated state.

== Heritage listing ==
As at 17 April 2012, Brush Farm House is a rare, State significant example of an early Colonial mansion in the Ryde area. Built by prominent colonial figure Gregory Blaxland, it is indicative of his position and status within the colony. With his brother John, he was involved in a wide variety of agricultural pursuits and early agricultural experimentation in the colony. Among innovations at Brush Farm was the establishment of the first vineyard in Australia, which had produced an award-winning vintage by the 1820s.

The house reflects the changing fortunes of the family and fashions of the 19th century, with significant additions following Blaxland's successes in the 1830s and the Victorianisation of the building by Blaxland's grandson William Forster in the late 19th century. Forster was a prominent figure in NSW politics, briefly serving as Premier of NSW for five months in 1859–1860 and serving in various capacities in Parliament until his death in 1882.

The conversion of the building to the Carpentarian Boys Academy in 1894 reflects the changing social attitudes towards orphaned children. The academy was established to train boys in useful agricultural skills and trades, to prepare them for their adult life. When the academy relocated to Mount Penang c. 1912, the site was given over to a variety of Government run institutions, including a home for single mothers and later for delinquent girls.

Fabric remains from all periods of use, from the c. 1816 original core of the house through to the timber hall added in the institutional phases. While presently in poor condition, the building can be conserved to its c. 1901 state, retaining elements of all phases of use.

A highly significant cultural and natural landscape resource exists beyond the building of Brush Farm House which includes rare remnant vineyard terracing of exceptional national heritage significance (particularly in coincidence with a largely intact early homestead); remnant Wianamatta Shale-based rainforest which is rare in the Northern Sydney district; areas of wet sclerophyll forest which are identified as an endangered ecological community under the Threatened Species Conservation Act; a potentially significant archaeological resource extending to the Department of Corrective Services Site (to the north and northeast), Lawson Street (south), and Brush Farm Park (south) which has the capacity to demonstrate important aspects of the development of the former estate from the 1810s to the present; and remnant view connections between Brush Farm House and the Parramatta River and its environs as well as the Parramatta district and the Blue Mountains.

Brush Farm has historic significance for its associations with Gregory Blaxland, explorer and viticulturist, and its place in the development of an Australian wine industry. After many setbacks, Blaxland produced tolerable wine in 1816 from Brush Farm. The Royal Society of Arts in London awarded its silver medal to Blaxland in 1823 for his colonial wine and in 1828 he received its gold medal. Blaxland's vines covered 3.5acres of his farm Brush Farm. Gregory Blaxland's vineyard was once described as the finest in the colony.

Brush Farm was listed on the New South Wales State Heritage Register on 2 April 1999.

== See also ==
- Australian residential architectural styles
