= Mankind (disambiguation) =

Mankind is a term that referred collectively to all human beings.

Mankind may also refer to:

- Mankind (play), a 15th-century morality play
- Mankind (video game), a 1998 massively multiplayer online real-time strategy game
- Mankind (album), an album by Factory 81
- Mankind (band), a disco band
- Mankind: The Story of All of Us, a 2012 American documentary series
- ManKind Initiative, a domestic violence charity
- ManKind Project, a non-profit, educational organization
- Mankind, a ringname used by professional wrestler Mick Foley (born 1965)
- "Mankind", a song by Pearl Jam from No Code
- The Australian Journal of Anthropology, formerly known as Mankind

== See also ==
- Humankind (disambiguation)
- Humanity (disambiguation)
- For All Mankind (disambiguation)
