= Parahuman =

Parahuman may refer to:

- Superhuman, metahuman, psychic, mystic
- Para-humans, a philosophical concept from posthumanism
- Para-humans, hominid species that branched off and are not pre-human, in human taxonomy
- Parahumans, a title sometimes used for the web serial Worm and its sequel Ward
- Parahumans, a character class in the GURPS-based tabletop RPG Transhuman Space
- Parahuman ability class in GURPS Infinite Worlds tabletop RPG platform

== See also ==
- Superhuman (disambiguation)
- Posthuman (disambiguation)
- Human (disambiguation)
- Para (disambiguation)
