= Humanity =

Humanity most commonly refers to:

- Human, also humankind
- Human civilization
- Humanity (virtue)

Humanity may also refer to:

== Literature ==
- Humanity: A Moral History of the Twentieth Century, a 1999 book by Jonathan Glover
- Humanity, a 1990 science fiction novel by Jerry Oltion in the Isaac Asimov's Robots and Aliens series

== Music ==
=== Albums ===
- Humanity (The Mad Capsule Markets album) (1990)
- Humanity..., a 2001 album by Shinji Orito
- Humanity: Hour I, a 2007 album by Scorpions
  - Humanity World Tour
- Humanity (EP), 2003, by Shy Child
- Humanity (Lincoln Thompson album) (1974)
- Humanity (album series), collection of seven albums by Thomas Bergersen (2020)

=== Songs ===
- "Humanity" (ATB song) (2005)
- "Humanity" (Scorpions song) (2007)

== Other uses ==
- Humanity (film), a 1916 American silent film by Broncho Billy Anderson
- Kingdom of Humanity, a micronation in the Spratly Islands from 1914 to 1963
- Religion of Humanity, a secular religion created by Auguste Comte
  - Church of Humanity, a church influenced by the Religion of Humanity
- Monument to Humanity, a 2009 statue in Kars, Turkey
- Humanity (video game), 2023, published by Enhance

== See also ==
- Human (disambiguation)
- Humane (disambiguation)
- Humain, a Saudi Arabian artificial intelligence company
- Humanitarianism, an ethic of kindness, benevolence, and sympathy
- Humanities, an academic discipline
- Humanity Declaration, a statement made by Japan's Emperor Hirohito at the end of World War II
- Humanity First, an international charitable trust
- Humanity World International, a volunteering and intern organization based in Accra, Ghana
- Humanity+, an international organization advocating for enhanced human capacities
- Mankind (disambiguation)
- "Oh the humanity", a phrase describing the Hindenburg fire
- Ren (Confucianism)
