= Posthuman (disambiguation) =

Posthuman is a hypothetical future being whose basic capacities so radically exceed those of present humans as to be no longer human by our current standards.

Posthuman may also refer to:

- Posthuman (band), a British band
- "Posthuman", a 1998 song by Marilyn Manson from Mechanical Animals
- Posthuman (Harm's Way album) (2018)
- Posthuman (JK Flesh album) (2012)
- Posthuman Records, a vanity label founded by Marilyn Manson
- Post Human: Survival Horror, a 2020 album by Bring Me the Horizon
- Post Human: Nex Gen, a 2024 album by Bring Me the Horizon
- "Posthuman", a song by Grand Mixer DXT and Bill Laswell, from their 2003 album Aftermathematics
- Posthuman Studios, developers of the tabletop role-playing game Eclipse Phase

== See also ==
- Posthumanism, postmodern philosophy's reinterpretation of what it means to be a human being
- Posthumanization, a process by which a society comes to incorporate members other than human beings
- Superhuman (disambiguation)
- Parahuman (disambiguation)
- Human (disambiguation)
