= Superhuman (disambiguation) =

A superhuman is a human or other beings with abilities or other attributes exceeding normal human standards or a being with capabilities that exceed human capacity.

Superhuman or super-human may also refer to:

== Philosophy ==
- Transhumanism, a cultural movement supporting the use of science and technology to improve human characteristics and capacities
- Übermensch, sometimes translated as "Superhuman", a concept of Friedrich Nietzsche

== Arts and entertainment ==
=== Music ===
- "Superhuman" (Chris Brown song)
- "Superhuman" (NCT 127 song)
- "Superhuman" (Slander song), a song by Slander featuring Eric Leva
- "Superhuman", a song by Velvet Revolver from Contraband

=== Television ===
- Superhuman, is the American title of Chinese-German television game show The Brain
- Stan Lee's Superhumans, documentary television series about superhumans
- Superhuman was also an American game show produced by Fox and broadcast in 2016–2017; see List of programs broadcast by Fox

=== Other ===
- Superhumanism (or Super Humanism), a late 20th-century art movement promoted by Nicholas Treadwell
- Super-Human, trade paperback of the Ultimates comic book series issues 1-6

== Technology ==
- Superhuman (email client) software

== See also ==
- Subhuman (disambiguation)
- Posthuman (disambiguation)
- Parahuman (disambiguation)
- Human (disambiguation)
- Super (disambiguation)
- Superman (disambiguation)
