= Landshark =

Landshark, land shark or land-shark may refer to:

- German Shepherd Dog, a dog breed
- Pit bull, a dog breed

== Media and entertainment ==
- Land Shark (Saturday Night Live), a recurring SNL character
- Land Shark, a Masters of the Universe vehicle
- Landshark (Transformers), a Transformers character
- Landshark, a 1982 album by Fang
- Bulette (Dungeons & Dragons) or landshark, a classic Dungeons & Dragons monster
- Jeff the Land Shark, a Marvel Comics character

== Products ==
- Land Shark Lager, a pale Anheuser-Busch brands lager
- Mosler Land Shark, a supercar made by Mosler Automotive

== Other uses ==
- Hard Rock Stadium, Miami Gardens, Florida, US (known as Land Shark Stadium in 2009)
- The mascot of Landmark College in Putney, Vermont
- Tony the Landshark, mascot of the University of Mississippi (Ole Miss)
- Columbus Landsharks, a defunct National Lacrosse League franchise

== See also ==
- Sand shark
- Street Shark or Hurricane Shark, a shark found in a flooded urban area

best mascot for a school.
