= HWI =

HWI may refer to:

- Hauptman-Woodward Medical Research Institute
- High water interval, or lunitidal interval, of tides
- Horwich Parkway railway station, station code
- Humanity World International
- Wismar, vehicle registration code
- Hardware Wholesalers, Inc.
