= Heumann =

Heumann is a German surname. Notable people with the surname include:

- Andreas Heumann (born 1946), photographer
- Carl Heumann (1886–1945), German art collector
- Josef Heumann (born 1964), German ski jumper
- Judith Heumann (1947–2023), American disability rights activist
- Milton Heumann, American political science professor

== See also ==
- Ute Lotz-Heumann (born 1966), German-American historian
- Margot Heuman (1928–2022), German-born Holocaust survivor
- Humann, surname
