= Granny Smith =

Apple cultivar

Malus 'Granny Smith'
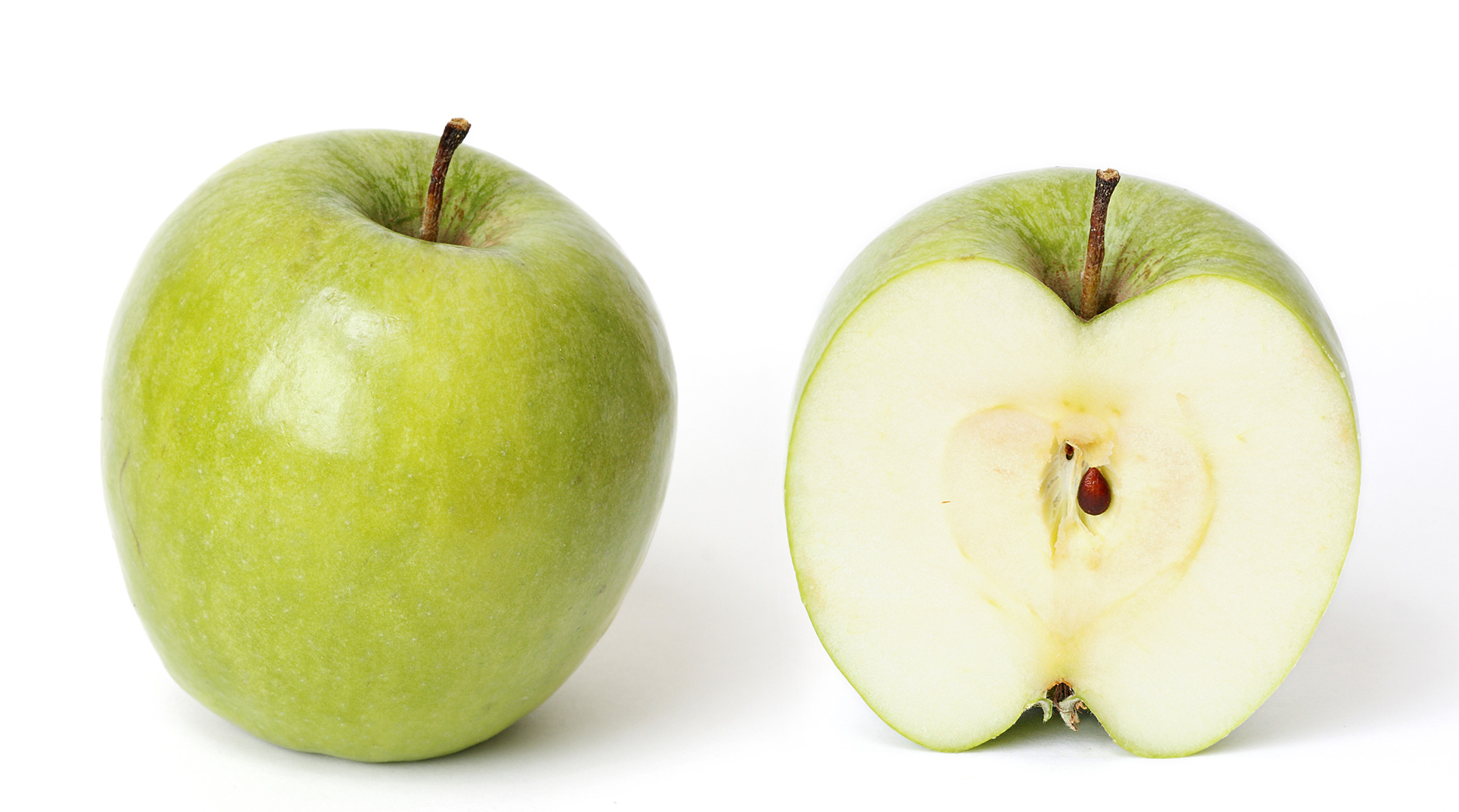
- Hybrid parentage: Thought to be M. domestica × M. sylvestris
- Cultivar: Granny Smith
- Origin: (Australia) Eastwood, New South Wales, 1868

The Granny Smith is an apple cultivar that originated in Australia in 1868. It is named after Maria Ann Smith, who propagated the cultivar from a chance seedling. The tree is thought to be a hybrid of Malus sylvestris, the European wild apple, with the domesticated apple Malus domestica as the polleniser.

The fruit is hard and firm with light green skin and has crisp, juicy flesh. The flavour is tart, often sour and acidic. It remains firm and mostly sweet when baked, making it a popular cooking apple used in pies, where it can be sweetened even further. The apple goes from being completely green to turning yellow when overripe. USApple Association reported in 2019 that the Granny Smith was the third most popular apple in the United States.

== History ==
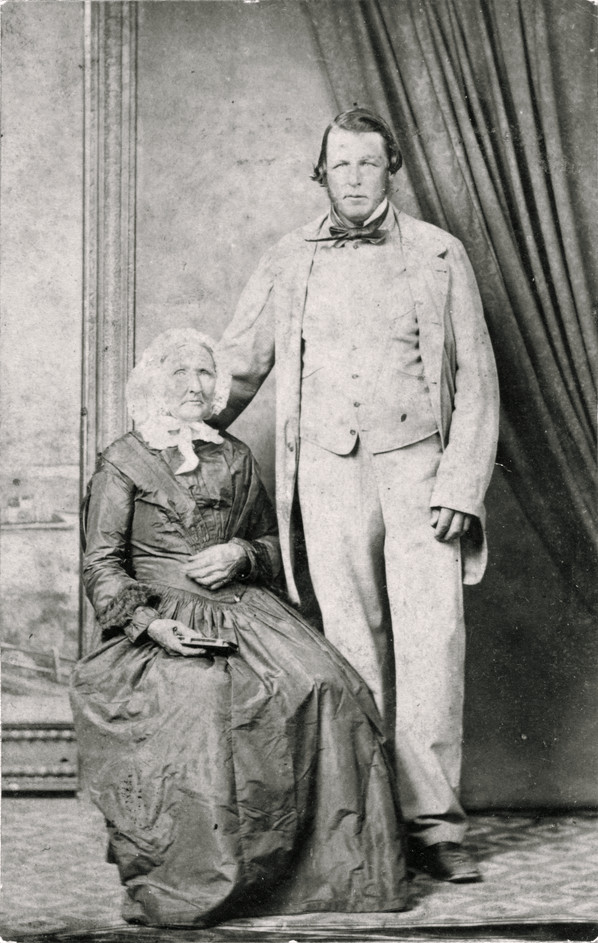
Maria Ann "Granny" Smith (1799–1870)

The Granny Smith cultivar originated in Eastwood, New South Wales, Australia (now a suburb of Sydney) in 1868. Its discoverer, Maria Ann Smith (née Sherwood), had emigrated to the district from Beckley, East Sussex in 1839 with her husband Thomas. They purchased a small orchard in the area in 1855–1856 and began cultivating fruit, for which the area was a well known centre in colonial Australia. Smith had eight children and was a prominent figure in the district, earning the nickname "Granny" Smith in her advanced years.

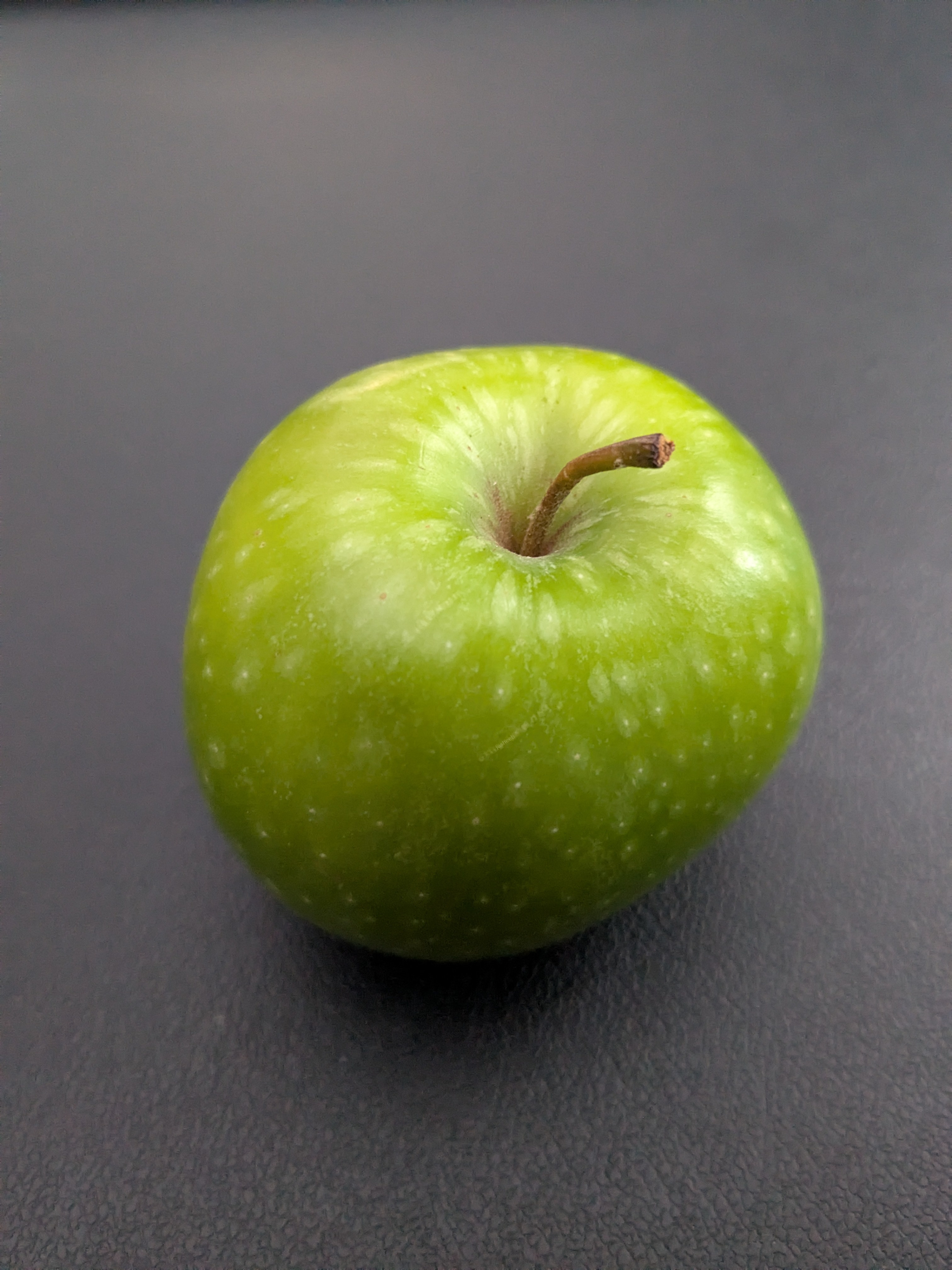
The Granny Smith apple is round in shape, light green in color, and has white spots scattered across its surface.

The first description of the origin of the Granny Smith apple was not published until 1924. In that year, Farmer and Settler published the account of a local historian who had interviewed two men who had known Smith. One of those interviewed recalled that, in 1868, he (then twelve years old) and his father had been invited to Smith's farm to inspect a chance seedling that had sprung near a creek. Smith had dumped there, among the ferns, the remains of French crab-apples that had been grown in Tasmania. Another story recounted that Smith had been testing French crab-apples for cooking, and, throwing the apple cores out her window as she worked, had found that the new cultivar had sprung up underneath her kitchen windowsill. Whatever the case, Smith took it upon herself to propagate the new cultivar on her property, finding the apples good for cooking and for general consumption. Having "all the appearances of a cooking apple," they were not tart but instead were "sweet and crisp to eat." She took a stall at Sydney's George Street market, where the apples stored "exceptionally well and became popular" and "once a week sold her produce there."

Smith died only a couple of years after her discovery (in 1870), but her work had been noticed by other local planters. Edward Gallard was one such planter, who extensively planted Granny Smith trees on his property and bought the Smith farm when Thomas died in 1876. Gallard was successful in marketing the apple locally, but it did not receive widespread attention until 1890. In that year, it was exhibited as "Smith's Seedling" at the Castle Hill Agricultural and Horticultural Show, and the following year it won the prize for cooking apples under the name "Granny Smith's Seedling." The apple was so highly successful that the following year, many were exhibiting Granny Smith apples at horticultural shows.

In 1895, the New South Wales Department of Agriculture recognised the cultivar and had begun growing the trees at the Government Experimental Station in Bathurst, New South Wales, recommending the gazette of its properties as a late-picking cooking apple for potential export. Over the following years the government actively promoted the apple, leading to its widespread adoption. Its worldwide fame grew from the fact that it could be picked in early autumn and stored up to nine months. Enterprising fruit merchants in the 1890s and the 1900s experimented with methods to transport the apples overseas in cold storage. Because of its excellent shelf life, the Granny Smith could be exported long distances and most times of the year, at a time when Australian food exports were growing dramatically on the back of international demand. Granny Smiths were exported in enormous quantities after the First World War, and by 1975, 40 percent of Australia's apple crop was Granny Smith. By this time, it was being grown intensely elsewhere in the Southern Hemisphere, as well as in France and the United States. The advent of the Granny Smith apple is now celebrated annually in Eastwood with the Granny Smith Festival.

== Culinary uses ==
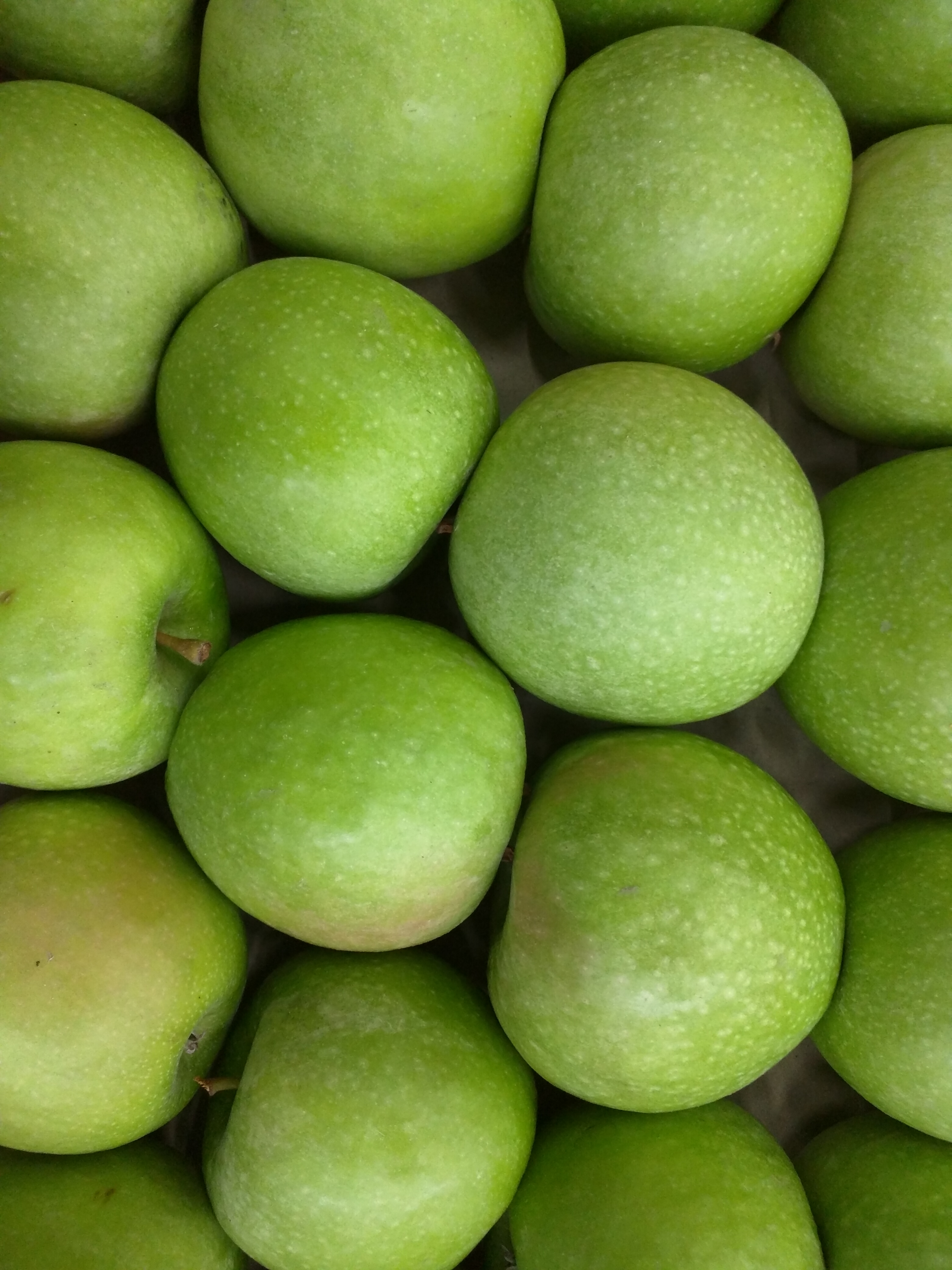
Granny Smith are distinctive in being bright green when ripe

Granny Smith apples are light green in colour. The tart flavor of these apples makes them one of the most versatile varieties of apple to cook with. They are popularly used in many apple dishes, such as apple pie, apple cobbler, apple crumble, and apple cake. They are also commonly eaten raw as table apples, and at least one company (Woodchuck Hard Cider) makes Granny Smith varietal cider.

== Properties ==
It is moderately susceptible to fire blight and is very prone to scab, powdery mildew, and cedar apple rust.

Granny Smith is much more easily preserved in storage than other apples, a factor which has greatly contributed to its success in export markets. Its long storage life has been attributed to its fairly low levels of ethylene production, and in the right conditions Granny Smiths can be stored without loss of quality for as long as a year. This cultivar needs fewer winter chill hours and a longer season to mature the fruit, so it is favoured for the milder areas of the apple growing regions. However, they are susceptible to superficial scald and bitter pit. Superficial scald may be controlled by treatment with diphenylamine before storage. It can also be controlled with low-oxygen storage. Pit can be controlled with calcium sprays during the growing season and with postharvest calcium dips.

According to the US Apple Association website, it is one of the fifteen most popular apple cultivars in the United States.

== Cultural references ==
In 1968, the rock band the Beatles used an image of a Granny Smith apple as the logo for their corporation, Apple Corps Limited. For their record label, Apple Records, one side of vinyl albums featured the exterior of the fruit, while the other side of the recording featured a cross-section of the apple.

Yoko Ono's 1966 artwork Apple used a Granny Smith apple in its 2015 recreation at New York City's Museum of Modern Art. John Lennon had taken a bite from the apple on display in its 1966 incarnation at the Indica Gallery in London.

The Granny Smith was one of four apples honored by the United States Postal Service in a 2013 set of four 33¢ stamps commemorating historic strains, joined by Northern Spy, Baldwin, and Golden Delicious.

== See also ==
- Candy apple
- Caramel apple
