= Eastwood, New South Wales =

Suburb of Sydney, New South Wales, Australia

Eastwood
- Suburb
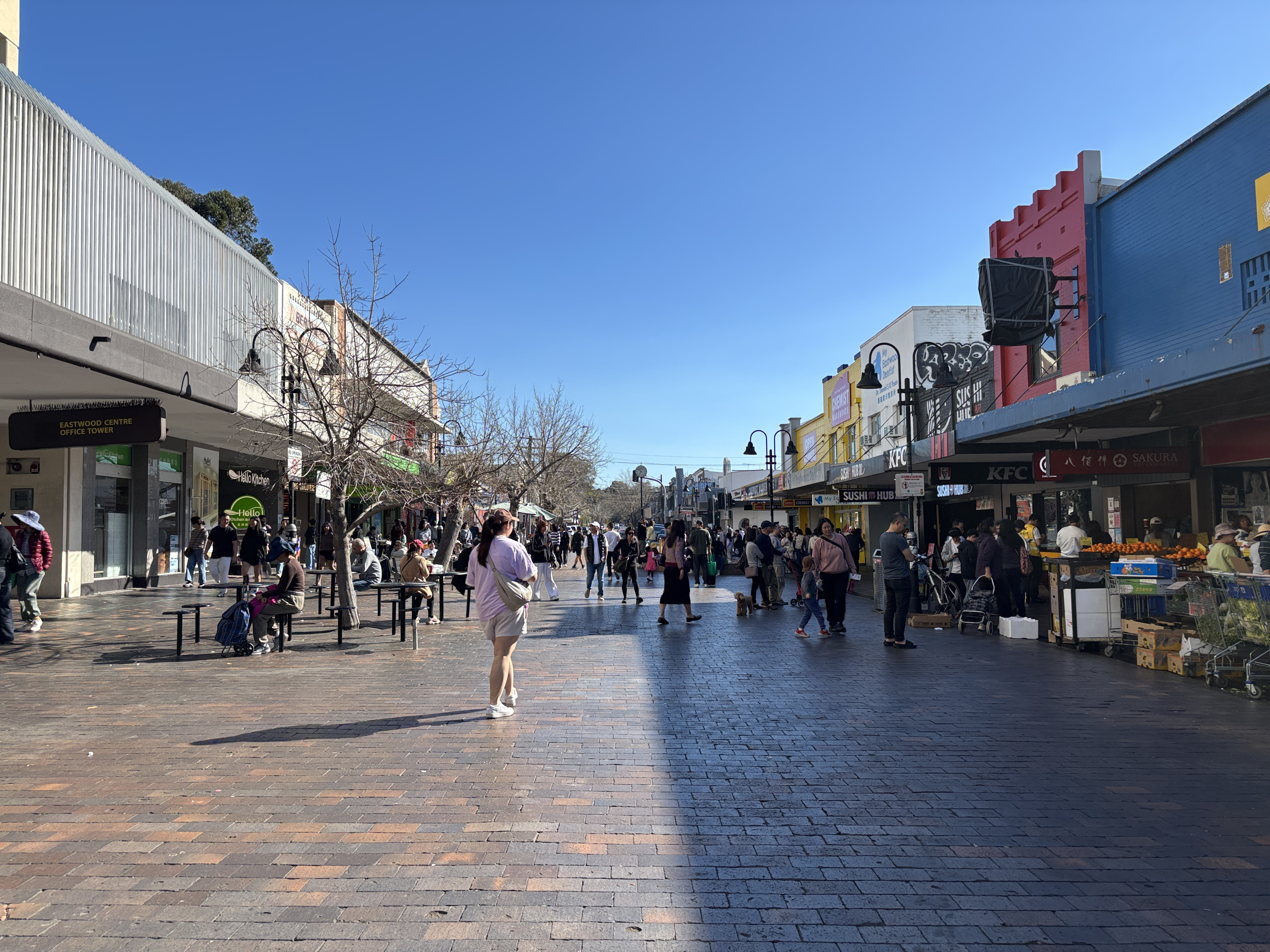
- The Rowe Street mall in Eastwood (pictured in 2026)

- Interactive map of Eastwood
- Coordinates: 33°47′25″S 151°04′56″E
- Country: Australia
- State: New South Wales
- Region: Northern Sydney
- City: Sydney
- LGAs: City of Ryde; City of Parramatta
- Location: 17 km (11 mi) NW of Sydney CBD

Government
  - State electorates: Epping; Ryde
  - Federal divisions: Bennelong; Parramatta

Area
  - Total: 5.2 km^{2} (2.0 sq mi)
- Elevation: 66 m (217 ft)

Population
  - Total: 18,695 (2021 census)
  - Density: 3,600/km^{2} (9,310/sq mi)
- Postcode: 2122
Suburbs around Eastwood
| Carlingford | Epping | Marsfield |
| Dundas Valley | Eastwood | Denistone East; Ryde |
| Ermington West Ryde | Denistone West | Denistone |

Eastwood is a suburb of Sydney, New South Wales, Australia. Eastwood is located 17 kilometres north-west of the Sydney central business district in the local government areas of the City of Ryde and the City of Parramatta. Eastwood is in the Northern Sydney region and is serviced by the Sydney Trains T9 Northern Line. Eastwood was originally its own town but due to the expansion of Sydney, was eventually absorbed. Originally thought to have been inhabited by the Wallumedegal people, who lived in the area between the Lane Cove and Parramatta Rivers, the area was first settled by Europeans shortly after the arrival of the First Fleet in 1788, from land grants to soldiers of the Royal Marines and the New South Wales Corps, and was named "Eastwood" by an early white free settler, William Rutledge. Today it is a large suburban centre in the north of Sydney of more than 19,000 people, with a large shopping area. Eastwood is largely populated by immigrants; the 2021 census recorded 58.7 percent of residents as having been born overseas, two thirds of these (66.9%) being established immigrants arriving in Australia more than ten years prior, the majority (51.3% of the overall populace – 87.4% of those born overseas) born in Asia.

Eastwood is famous for the Granny Smith apple, which was accidentally first grown in the suburb by Maria Ann Smith from a chance seedling. Every October, the oval and cordoned-off streets become the grounds for the annual Granny Smith Festival, a celebration of the icon with fairground rides, market stalls, street theatres, parades, an apple-baking competition and a fireworks spectacular at the Upper Eastwood Oval. In recent years the festival has been influenced by the substantial Asian immigrant communities, with Chinese dragon dancers in the Grand Parade and Chinese stallholders. During the same period, Eastwood's annual Chinese New Year Celebrations have broadened their appeal by incorporating concurrent Korean New Year traditions, and have accordingly been renamed the Lunar New Year Festivities.

== Geography ==
Eastwood is located at the edge of the Hornsby Plateau with the suburbs of Dundas Valley and Denistone on its western and southern sides, respectively, as the land falls away down to the Cumberland Plain. To the north, Eastwood is bounded by the transport hub of Epping and to its east Marsfield which shares the same postcode of 2122. The suburb is predominantly residential with the main shopping area of Eastwood centred between Rowe Street and Rutledge Street around the railway line.

== History ==
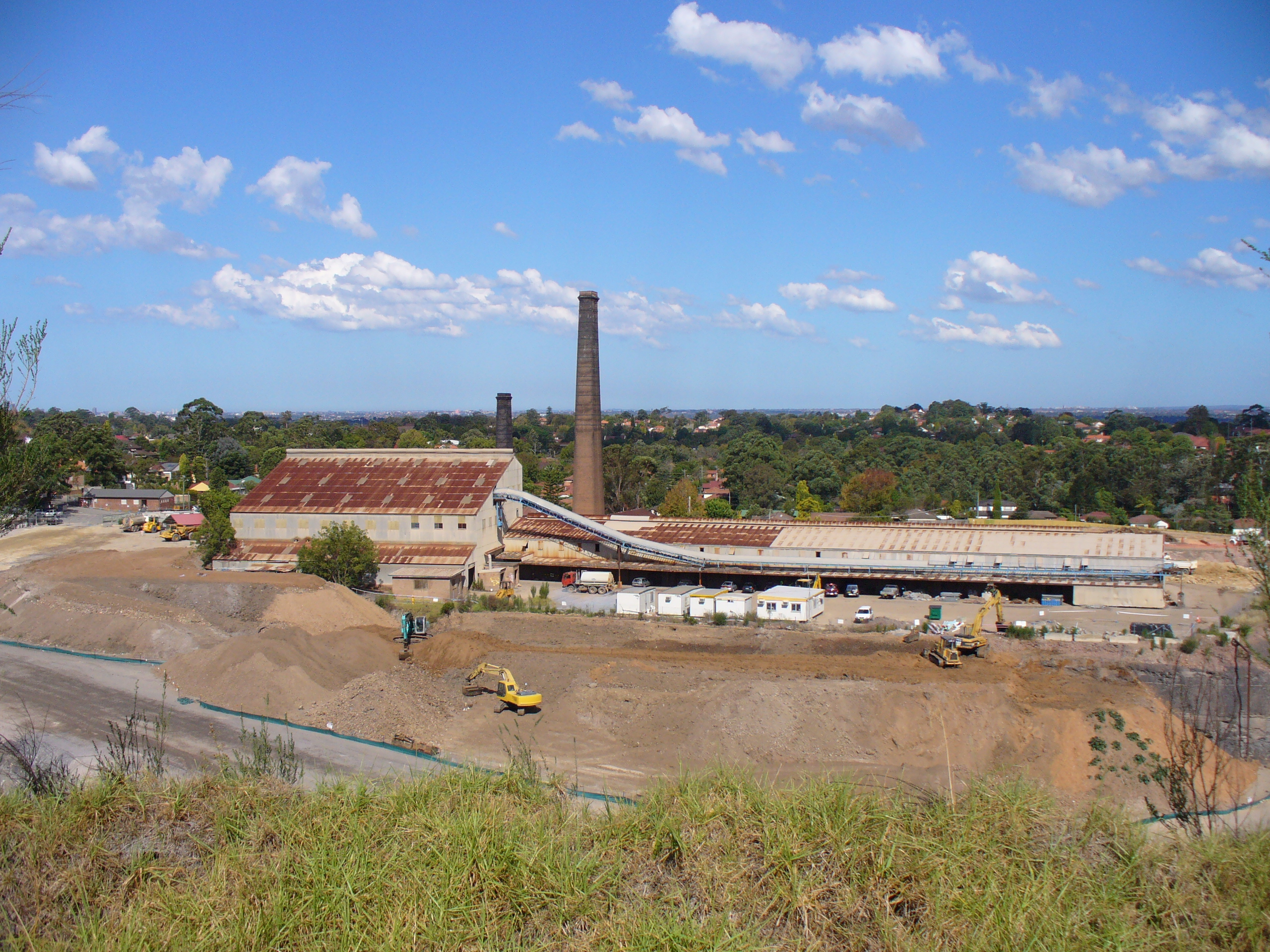
The old Eastwood Brickworks site, now developed into a housing estate

The Wallumedegal aboriginal tribe lived in the area between the Lane Cove River and Parramatta River, which was known as Walumetta. The area was originally heavily timbered.

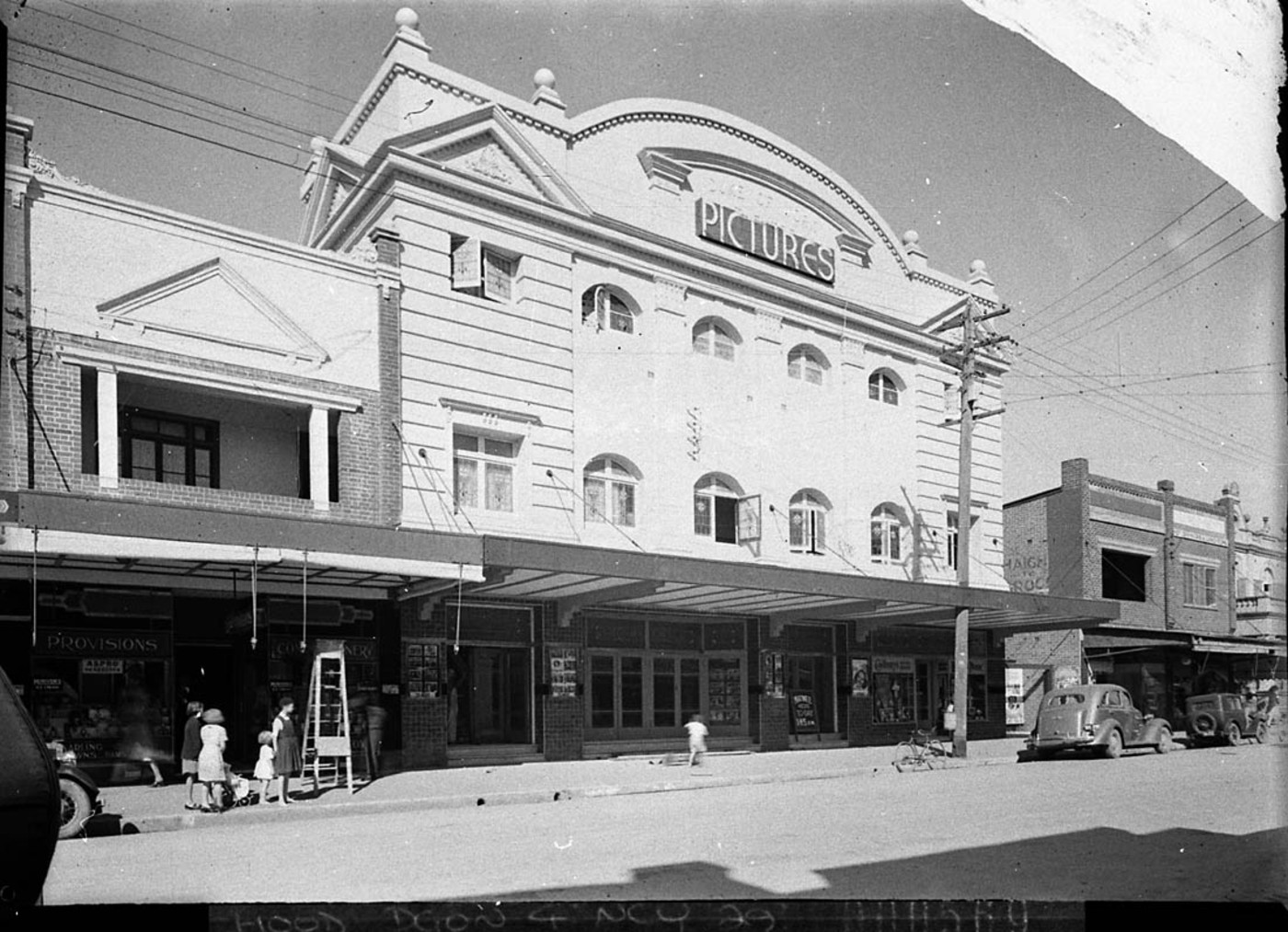
Duke of York Theatre, pictured in 1938

The area was first settled by Europeans shortly after the arrival of the First Fleet in 1788; it is located in the Field of Mars Parish and was part of the Field of Mars Common located in its northern area. The area of Eastwood was originally granted between the years of 1790 and 1803 to members of the Royal Marines and the New South Wales Corps. John Love, a private, was granted 90 acres (36 ha) here in 1794, described as "North Brush, in the Field of Mars Common". The land was then acquired by William Kent, who already held land in what is now Epping. The land was purchased by William Rutledge for 288 pounds in 1835, who built 'Eastwood House' in 1840. This house is now part of Marist College Eastwood. Scottish born John Ross, who was part of the "squattocracy", owned Eastwood from 1860 until 1863. He reputedly paid £60 000 for it. In 1863 Edward Terry purchased the estate and upon his death in 1905, the estate was sub-divided.

In 1886, the Main Northern railway line from Strathfield to Hornsby was opened, with a station here originally called Dundas. This was changed a year later to Eastwood, named after the Eastwood Estate.

The commercial centre underwent a major upgrade in the early 1980s. Rowe Street, which originally ran across the railway line through a level crossing was turned into a mall between The Avenue and West Parade, and the 1940s bridge built in First Avenue for crossing traffic was replaced with a six-lane bridge. This bridge was to service the planned County of Cumberland Scheme, Eastwood County Road (linking Eastwood with Macquarie Park), a road project in the local area which has been controversial among locals.

== Commercial area ==
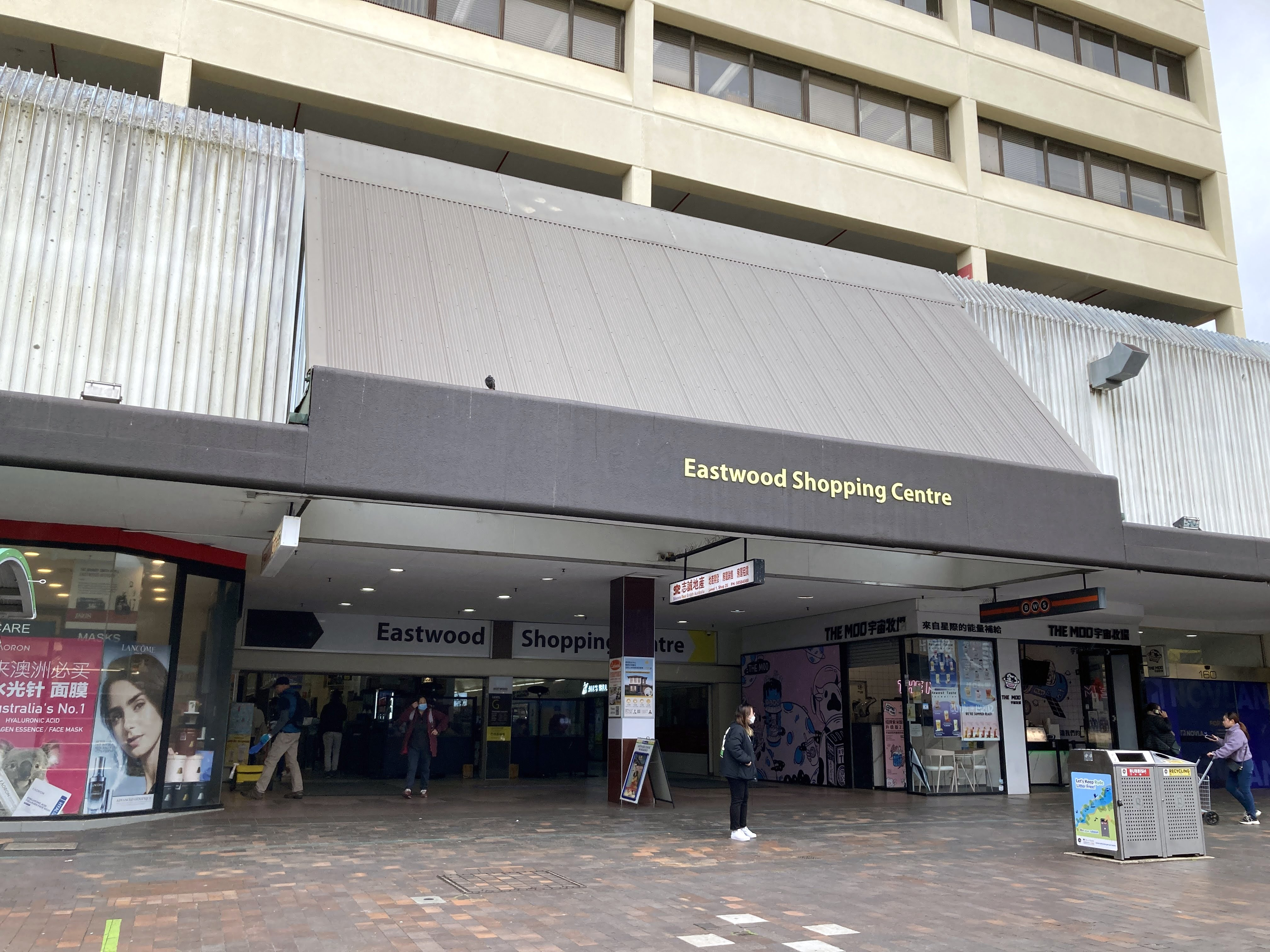
Eastwood Shopping Centre, the centrepiece of the main commercial area.

The Eastwood commercial district is located around Eastwood railway station.

Eastwood Shopping Centre, built in 1976 on the former Odeon Theatre, is a 2-storey centre that once featured Target, Tandy Electronics, BBC Hardware and Woolworths. However, due to growth in nearby Macquarie Centre and Top Ryde City these stores have all closed, leaving Woolworths as the sole anchor tenant.

Eastwood Village (formerly Westfield Eastwood) is a shopping centre located on Progress Avenue. Westfield Eastwood opened in 1964 and featured Mark Foy's. The store became a McDowells store and then a Waltons in 1972. In 1994, the Waltons store closed and the Westfield Group sold the centre; it is now called Eastwood Village including a supermarket (originally Franklins, rebranded to IGA in 2011–2015).

Eastwood Plaza is located on the pedestrianised section of Rowe Street. The Plaza features a fountain and several cafes with outdoor seating. Eastwood is becoming well known as an Asian shopping precinct, with speciality stores, supermarkets and many restaurants run by Chinese and Korean retailers. The ethnic background of its shoppers has created a hub of mainly Chinese, Vietnamese, Cantonese, Singaporean, Hong Kong and Korean restaurants and eateries in the area.

== Transport ==
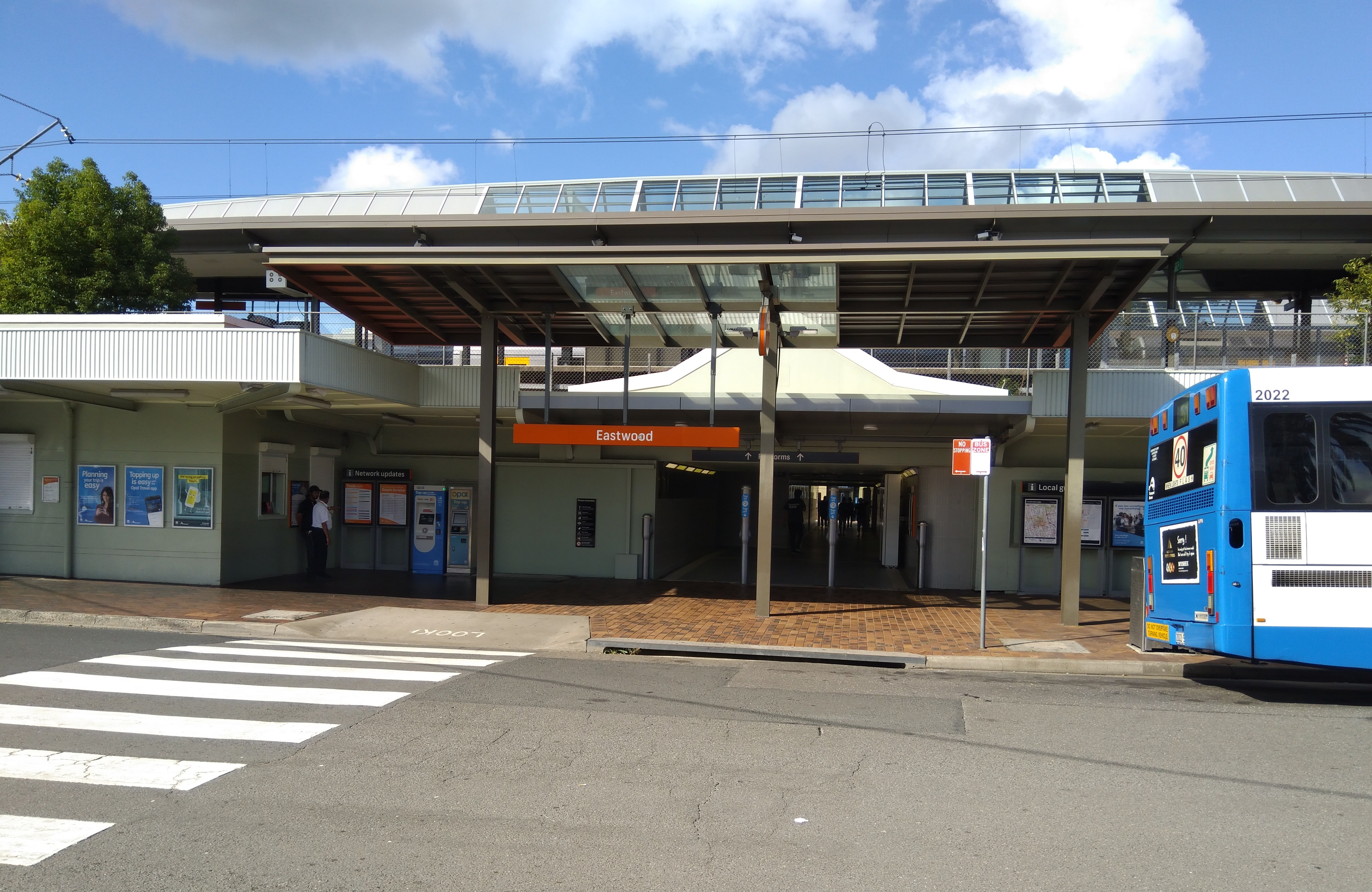
Eastwood Station after its 2007 reconstruction

Eastwood is relatively well served by public transport. Eastwood railway station is located on the Main Northern railway line. The station opened in 1886, and it takes approximately 30–35 minutes to travel to Central.

Numerous Busways bus services also operate from the small interchange outside the station. These include the 545 route between Parramatta and Macquarie Park, the 544 route between Auburn and Macquarie University, and the 515 service to Ryde. Eastwood is also served well by roads, and is located close to the trunk routes of the A6 (Marsden Road), and Victoria Road.

Despite the range of public transport options, the 2016 census found that 31.4% of employed people travelled to work on public transport and 53.6% by car (either as driver or as passenger).

== Landmarks ==
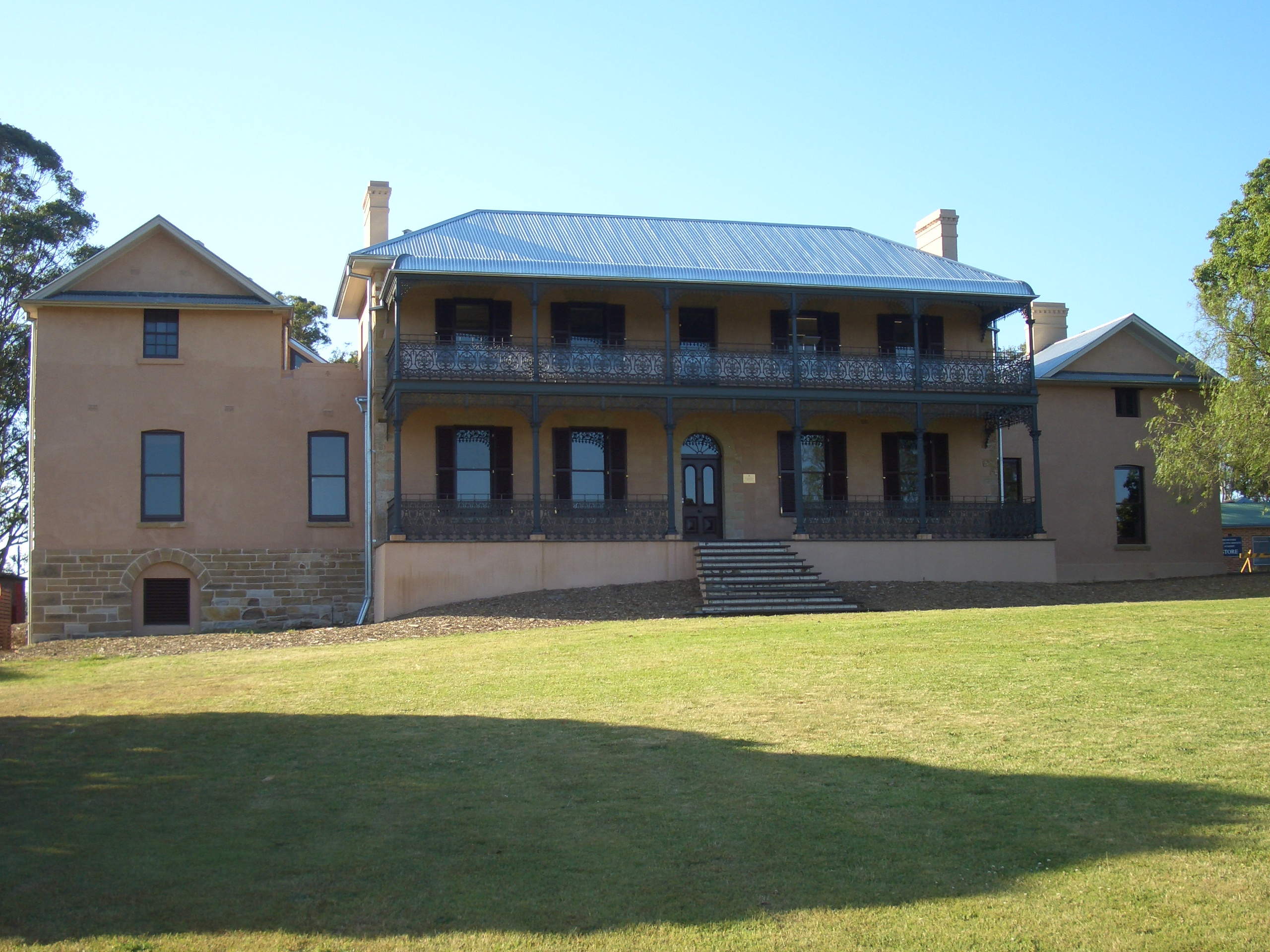
Brush Farm House, Eastwood

- Brush Farm House on Marsden Road – former home of Gregory Blaxland, one of the explorers of the Blue Mountains. It is included on the NSW State Heritage Register and the National Trust of Australia register.
- Brickyard Park situated near 8 Avondale Way – The park is well designed and makes the most of its heritage. Many of the structures associated with the old brickworks have been retained. Some walls, lots of kilns, thousands of bricks re-purposed as pavers.
- The Downdraft Kiln also located near 8 Avondale Way – The Eastwood brickworks, established in 1912, featured two kilns with a total capacity of 600,000 bricks. A highlight was the new patent kiln—constructed with 900,000 bricks—reputedly the second largest in Australia. Set amid the machinery that ground rock and clay to powder, the kilns stood like giants beside a roaring industrial rockpool of steam and power.
- Eastwood House – the former home of Edward Terry, the original landowner of the estate on which Eastwood is now built, and now part of the administration offices of the local Marist Brothers Secondary College. It is Heritage Listed.
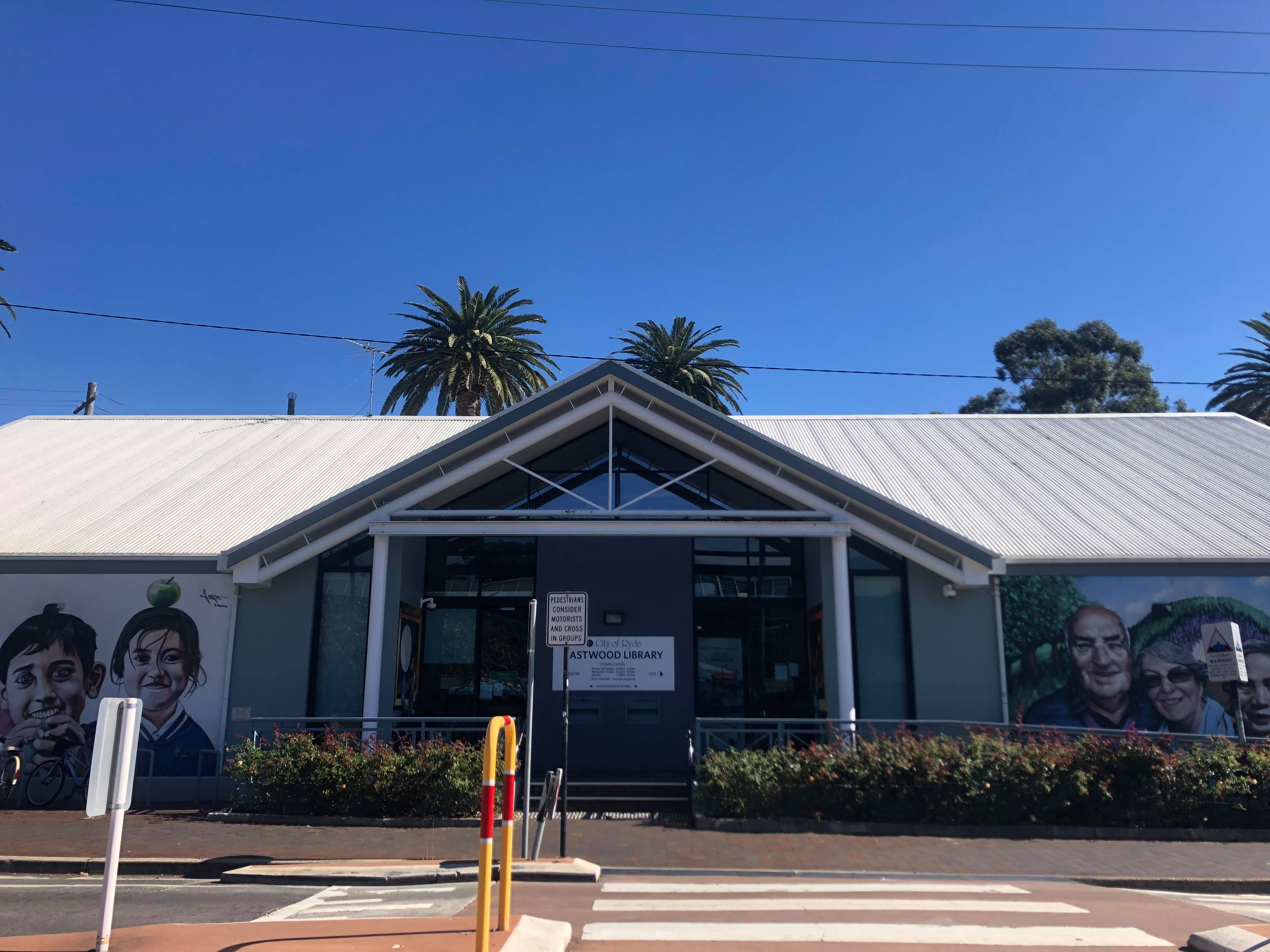
- Eastwood Library, Cnr Hillview Road and West Parade, Eastwood NSW which features two mural artworks painted by street artist, Heesco
  Eastwood Public Park (EPP) Grandstand and Pavilion – these date from 1933 and 1935 respectively. The croquet pavilion is still in use for its original purpose, associated with the Eastwood Croquet Club, and available for hire by the local community. Both are Heritage listed.
- Ripley (14 Auld Avenue) was built in 1907, on the 1897 Bush Farm Estate subdivision. The house, designed by architect George W Durrell, is an example of the Federation Arts and Crafts style, rare in the Eastwood area. It is Heritage listed.
- Ryde Hospital on Denistone Road is a public hospital that has been demolished and is being rebuilt
- Eastwood Library on the Corner Hillview Road and West Parade.
- Corrective Services Academy, a training centre for prison officers, is on the site of what was previously Brush Farm Public School.

Eastwood once featured a lake which gave the names Lakeside Road and The Lakeside Road Uniting Church. This lake was later converted to an oval which is used for soccer matches and by local schools. The oval still occasionally floods after heavy rainfall.

== Forest reserves ==
Darvall Park and Brush Farm Park are examples of remnant forest areas in the Eastwood district. Volunteers and professional bush regenerators have worked to preserve the Blue Gum High Forest and rainforest in these areas. The largest tree heath known in existence occurs at Brush Farm park. Other notable plants include native crabapple, jackwood and red olive berry. Despite being within a large city, Brush Farm has remarkable fauna, including the powerful owl, emerald dove, eastern whipbird, satin bowerbird and the green tree snake.

== Housing ==
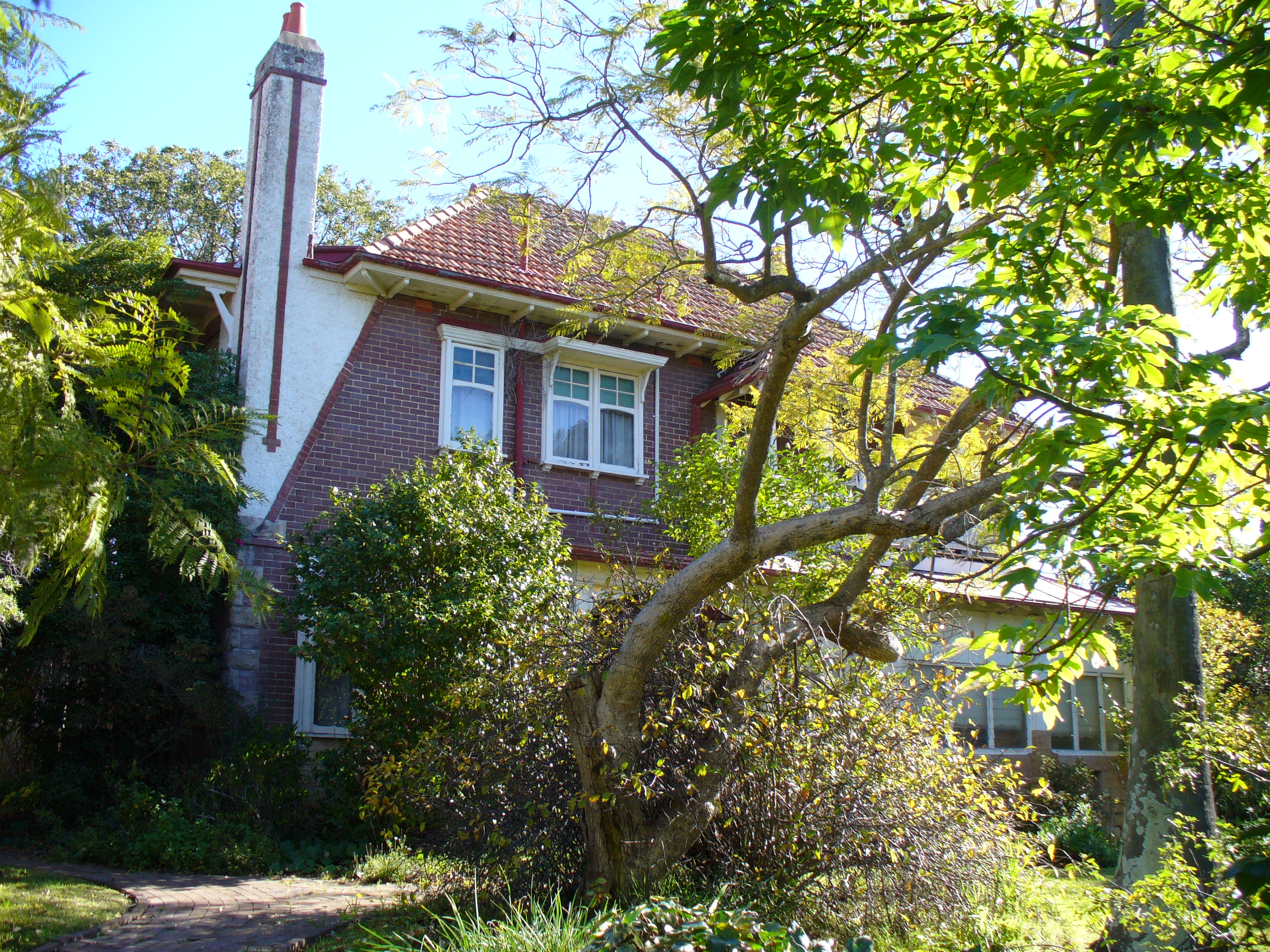
"Heatherwold" was a former girls' school, Braemar College, in Eastwood.

At the 2021 census, more than half (52.8%) of occupied private dwellings in Eastwood were separate houses, 28.2% were flats, units or apartments, and 17.9% were semi-detached or townhouses. Three-quarters (75.1%) were family households, 20.0% were single person households and 4.9% were group households. The average household size was 2.8 people.

Housing consists of many Californian Bungalow and Federation homes, especially in streets located closer to the station. More post World War II homes can be seen further from the station, especially to the north of Terry Road. While most of Eastwood is residential, with one or two-storey detached houses and villas, the area surrounding the town centre boasts buildings up to seven storeys high. In 2006 the City of Ryde developed a Control Plan for the Eastwood Town Centre, which includes the provision of buildings of up to ten storeys high in the shopping and railway areas. Former industrial parts of the suburb are also undergoing redevelopment. The former brickworks site was converted into a housing estate.

== Churches ==
- Christ Evangelical Centre of Australia (CECA)
- Eastwood Baptist Church
- Exclusive Brethren Church
- Lakeside Road Uniting Church (former Methodist Church)
- Macquarie Chapel – Pastor Richard Quadrio started the church in 2001. It is combined with Macquarie Presbyterian Church.
- St Andrew's Uniting Church – (former Presbyterian Church): Demolished and now merged with Lakeside Uniting Church
- St Kevin's Catholic Church – this church was completed in 1994 to replace the original church, which is now the library of the local Catholic school (St Kevins.)
- St Philip's Anglican Church was founded over 100 years ago, and has met in the current church building since 1907.
- Cornerstone Presbyterian Community Church Eastwood (meets at Eastwood Heights Public School)
- St George's Anglican Church, Balaclava Road, Eastwood Heights
- St Dunstan's Anglican Church, Lovell Road, Eastwood
- The Church of Jesus Christ of Latter-day Saints, Blaxland Road, Denistone East
- The Crusader Union of Australia, known as Crusaders, is based in Eastwood.

== Schools ==
Primary Schools

- Eastwood Heights Public School
- Eastwood Public School
- St Kevins Eastwood (Catholic primary school)

High Schools

- Marist College Eastwood

== Culture and events ==
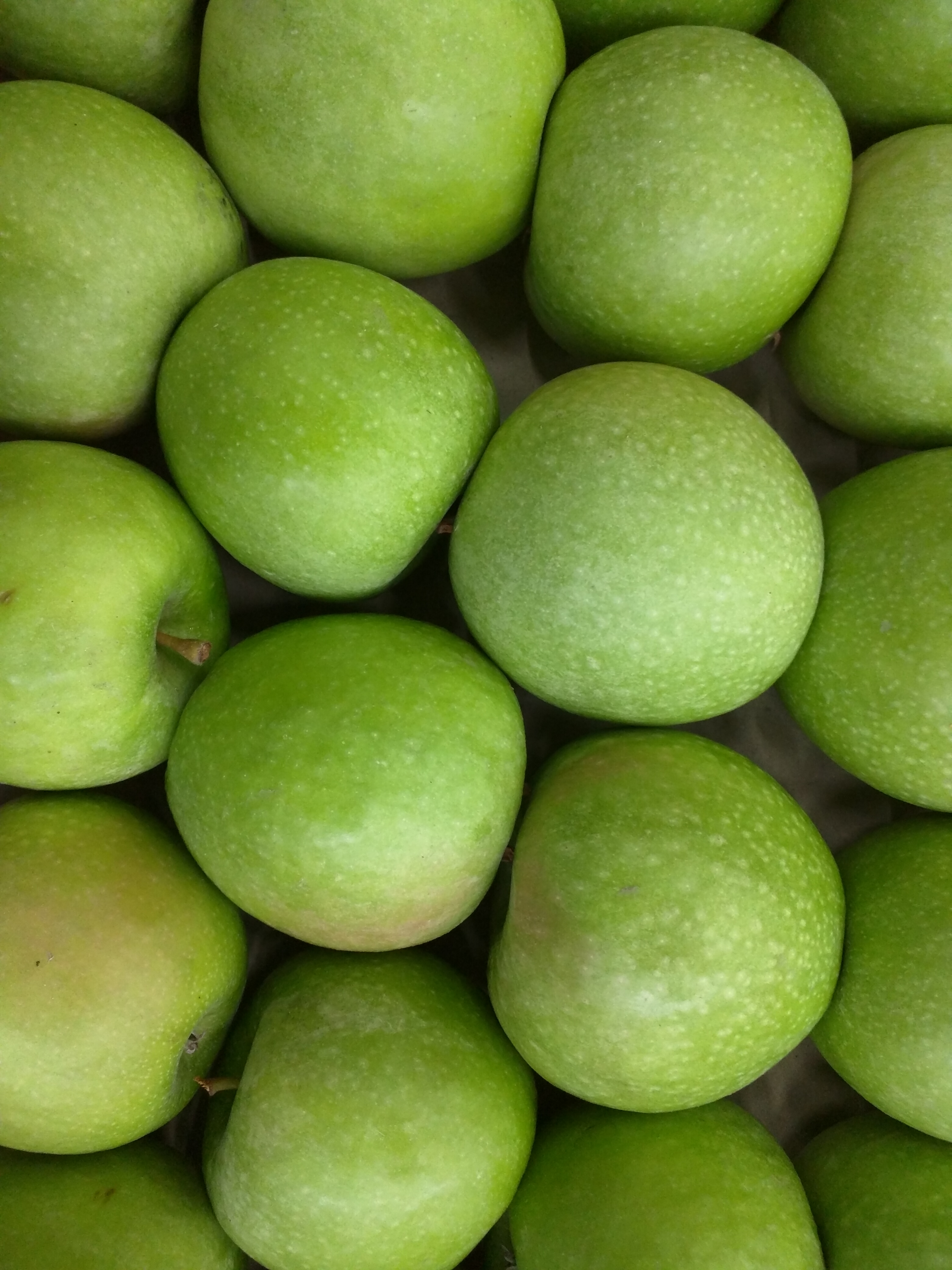
Eastwood is home to the first Granny Smith apple and holds a commemorative festival every October.

Eastwood is well known as the place where the Granny Smith apple was first grown. This is celebrated each October with the Granny Smith Festival which attracts over 60,000 people each year.

"Humans of Eastwood" is an online community, which regularly shares news and events from Eastwood and its neighbouring suburbs.

== Population ==
Today it is a large suburban centre in the north of Sydney with over 17,000 residents. Over the past few decades Eastwood has become increasingly multicultural. Migrants from southern Europe countries such as Italy and Greece began settling here and at Carlingford from the 1960s. From the early eighties onwards, many Chinese and Koreans settled in the area.

=== Demographics ===
At the 2021 census, the suburb of Eastwood recorded a population of 18,695 people. Of these:

Age distribution
Compared to the national average, Eastwood has a slightly higher number of residents aged between 20 and 34. Eastwood residents' median age was 39 years, compared to the national median of 38. Children aged under 15 years made up 15.8% of the population (the national average was 18.2%) and people aged 65 years and over made up 17.4% of the population (the national average was 17.2%).
Ethnic diversity
The most common self-identified ancestries were: Chinese (48.8%), English (11.6%), Australian (10.7%), Korean (8.8%) and Irish (3.8%). Well under half (37.6%) of Eastwood residents were born in Australia; the next most common countries of birth were China (excludes SARs and Taiwan) (25.9%), South Korea (6.8%), Hong Kong (SAR of China) (4.5%), Malaysia (2.4%) and India (2.3%). Less than a third (30.0%) of the residents spoke only English at home; other languages spoken at home included Mandarin (28.3%), Cantonese (14.5%), Korean (8.3%), Tamil (1.3%) and Vietnamese (0.9%).
Religion
This question is optional in the Census. Of the people who answered it, the most common response was "No Religion" (45.2%); the next most common responses were Catholic (15.1%), Buddhism (6.6%) and Anglican (5.9%).
Income
The median weekly household income was $1,945, somewhat higher than the national median of $1,746.

=== Residents ===
- The band All Mankind, best known for the song "Break the Spell" are residents of Eastwood

=== Former residents ===
- Natalie Bennett, former leader of the Green Party of England and Wales
- Reg Campbell – portrait painter and self-taught artist
- Jordan Gusman - middle-distance runner, born here and moved to Corindi Beach at 5
- Lenny Hayes – former Australian rules footballer with St Kilda
- Geoffrey Robertson – human rights lawyer, academic, author and broadcaster
- Aziz Shavershian – bodybuilder and internet personality
- Maria Ann Smith – orchardist, who is known for growing the first Granny Smith apples
