= Hurricane Shark =

Usually-fabled sharks swimming in hurricane floodwater

Hurricane Shark and Street Shark are nicknames for several claimed instances of a live shark swimming in a flooded urban area, typically in the aftermath of a hurricane. For more than a decade (starting with Hurricane Irene in 2011), all media purporting to document such claims — most notably an image of a shark swimming on a flooded freeway — were debunked as fabrications. However, during Hurricane Ian in 2022, the Associated Press verified a video taken by Dominic Cameratta of a shark or other large fish swimming in flooded Fort Myers, Florida; one consulted expert concluded that the fish was "a juvenile shark" while another was unable to determine whether it was a shark. Both the re-emergence of the hoax in hurricane after hurricane and the eventual appearance of a plausible claim have been the subject of commentary and amusement; Daniel Victor of The New York Times described the Associated Press's findings as "like discovering Bigfoot is real".

== Hoax images ==
=== Freeway image ===
The original "Hurricane Shark" image

The original "Hurricane Shark" image was created during Hurricane Irene in 2011, with a claim that the shark was on a street in Puerto Rico. According to The Washington Post, it likely originated on Reddit. In the aftermath of the hurricane, the image was aired by Miami Fox affiliate WSVN, was posted by the Miami Herald, and was widely shared on social media websites including Twitter.

External image
- National Geographic article featuring Peschak's 2003 photo

The image was debunked by the Post, Snopes.com, and the Toronto Star. It had been created by combining an image of a flooded street in Puerto Rico with a photo of a shark taken by Thomas P. Peschak off the coast of South Africa in 2003. The Post compared it to similar hoax images, such as one supposedly of Osama bin Laden's body following his death. Craig Silverman, writing in the Star, cast it as part of a larger phenomenon of hoax images appearing in the aftermath of significant events.

The image has frequently resurfaced on the internet with claims that it was taken during various flooding events, including in Houston during both the 2015 Texas–Oklahoma flood and tornado outbreak and the 2017 floods caused by Hurricane Harvey, and in Daytona Beach, Florida, in 2016 during floods caused by Hurricane Matthew. Peschak has said his fans notify him each time the image re-emerges, but that "they're more outraged than I am".

=== Other images ===
After Toronto's Union Station flooded in June 2012, a manipulated image circulated purporting to show two sharks at the base of an escalator bank. The image was later reused in a hoax claiming that a shark tank had burst at the Kuwait Scientific Center. While the flooding in Toronto was not the result of a hurricane, the hoax has often been compared to the main Hurricane Shark hoax.

Later in 2012, after Hurricane Sandy struck New Jersey, other fake shark images circulated in addition to the better-known freeway one. One image appears to depict a shark outside of a home in a suburban area. Another appears to show a shark swimming down a suburban street. Tom Phillips and Alexis Madrigal found the real shark image used to create the former; Snopes did the same for the latter.

During both Hurricane Irma and Hurricane Florence, fake television breaking news screen captures were seen online saying that the hurricane "now contains sharks", although neither contained images of sharks.

== In popular culture ==
Avatar of The Washington Post

The Washington Post
(@washingtonpost)
tweeted:

No, Hurricane Florence does not contain sharks

September 13, 2018

Hurricane sharks as hoaxes have taken on a life of their own, in social media and in the press. Doctored photos of sharks swimming in urban areas went viral on social media in virtually every disastrous storm and hurricane in the decade since, often copies of the image that first circulated during Irene. Some on social media have treated the Hurricane Shark as a meme, an in-joke hoax to be revived with each disaster, while others have genuinely believed in the authenticity of the photos being spread. Commentators have made comparisons to Sharknado, a film series that also involves sharks caught up in natural disasters. In response to the "now contains sharks" images circulated during Hurricane Florence, FEMA's Associate Director of Office of Response and Recovery, Jeffrey Byard, denied that "there's a sharknado effect or anything like that".

Because of the recurring nature of the meme, fact-checkers and journalists in the media have repeatedly needed to clarify that the images of Hurricane sharks were hoaxes. According to Daniel Victor, writing for The New York Times in 2022, Hurricane Shark is the "longtime nemesis" of fact-checkers on social media. In Silverman's Verification Handbook, Phillips makes a case study of his work with Madrigal during Hurricane Sandy, describing the images they reviewed as "strange enough to make you suspicious, yet [not] implausible enough to dismiss out of hand". Rose Eveleth, in a 2014 piece for BBC Future about how to spot fake Sandy photos, includes as her list's final item, "If it has a shark in it, it's probably fake".

== Possible real cases ==
An early claim of sharks in a flooded urban area, predating the original Hurricane Shark hoax, occurred in Goodna, Queensland, Australia, amidst major flooding in January 2011. Butcher Steve Bateman reported a shark, roughly 6 feet (1.8 m) in length, swimming past his shop, and several others reported seeing a shark on a different street. Two local politicians vouched for Bateman's credibility, and The Queensland Times noted that sharks are known to swim up the Bremer River to Goodna.

Similarly, from 1996 to 2013, a golf course lake at Carbrook, Logan City, Queensland, Australia was the home to several bull sharks. They were trapped following a flood of the Logan and Albert Rivers in 1996, and resided in the 51-acre (21 ha) lake until 2013, whence they disappeared after another series of floods.

=== Fort Myers video ===
External videos
- "Shark Reported in Flooded Fort Myers"

In September 2022, after Hurricane Ian struck Florida, a video emerged online of a shark in a flooded backyard in Fort Myers, Florida, drawing over 12 million views within a day. Initially, the video received skepticism from journalists and fact-checkers, wary of the long history of similar media being hoaxes while also noting that the video seemed more authentic than previous renditions.

On September 29, the Associated Press, while noting the history of the Hurricane Shark, confirmed the authenticity of the video based on analysis of the video's metadata and an interview with the videographer, Dominic Cameratta. The Associated Press consulted shark experts George H. Burgess and Neil Hammerschlag; the former concluded that the fish "appears to be a juvenile shark", while the latter said "it's pretty hard to tell." Storyful, in acquiring distribution rights for Cameratta's footage, said it had confirmed the video's authenticity but not whether it depicted a shark, and quoted Rick Bartleson of the Sanibel-Captiva Conservation Foundation, who doubted that the fish was a shark or sawfish based on its dorsal fin. Cameratta told the Associated Press that he estimated the fish's length at 4 feet (1.2 m) and speculated that it had come from Hendry Creek by way of an overflowing retention pond. Both Burgess and marine biologist Yannis Papastamatiou described manners in which this could happen to a shark from the Gulf of Mexico.

==== Reaction ====
Several journalists celebrated the unusual occurrence of a frequent hoax claim turning out to be true in one case. In the Times, Victor remarked that "it was like discovering Bigfoot is real", referencing a tweet by Ellie Hall reading simply "🚨HURRICANE SHARK IS REAL 🚨", and quoting journalist Jane Lytvynenko's tweet:

After over half a decade of debunking this hoax every time there was a flood or hurricane, I can't believe I'm looking at an honest-to-god street shark.

Good to finally meet you, pal.

Hall wrote an article in BuzzFeed News describing the "calming sense of constancy" brought by the hoax images of Hurricane Shark, and referring to Cameratta's video as "a meme-made manifestation". Regarding the species of the fish, Hall wrote that while she could not confirm that it was a shark, "this is the closest that humanity has come to an honest-to-god Hurricane Shark—and we choose to believe."
