= For All Mankind =

For All Mankind may refer to:

- For All Mankind (film), a 1989 documentary film drawn from original footage of NASA's Apollo program
- For All Mankind (TV series), a 2019 American science-fiction streaming television series
- For All Mankind, a 2008 album by The Phenomenauts
- For All Mankind, a 1988 book by American author and journalist Harry Hurt III

== See also ==
- The lunar plaque left by Apollo 11, which reads in part, "We came in peace for all mankind"
- 7 for All Mankind, an American denim brand
- All Mankind, an Australian rock/indie rock band
- For All Moonkind, non-profit organization
