= Human (disambiguation) =

Humans are a superfamily of highly intelligent apes.

Human(s) may also refer to:

== Science ==
- Human, any member of the genus Homo (since c. 2.5 million years)
  - Human taxonomy, the classification of the species Homo sapiens
  - Archaic humans, since c. 200,000 years
  - Homo sapiens idaltu (c. 160,000 years ago), the name given to a number of around 160,000-year-old hominid fossils found in 1997 in Herto Bouri, Ethiopia
  - Homo sapiens sapiens, anatomically modern humans
- Human appearance, the outward phenotype or look of human beings
  - Human variability, the range of possible values for any physical or mental characteristic of human beings
- Human behavior, the range of behaviors exhibited by humans
- Human condition, the unique features of being human
  - Human nature, the distinguishing characteristics that humans tend to have independent of the influence of culture
  - Human self-reflection, the capacity of humans to exercise introspection and the willingness to learn more about their fundamental nature

== Arts and entertainment ==
=== Film and television ===
==== Films ====
- Human (1976 film), a Mexican film directed by Gustavo Alatriste
- Human (2015 film), a documentary by Yann Arthus Bertrand

==== TV series ====
- Human (TV series), an Indian television series
- Humans (TV series), an English-language science fiction TV series about artificial intelligence and robotics
- Humans (2021 TV series), a 2021 Chinese remake
- Human, a 2025 palaeoanthropology documentary series by Ella Al-Shamahi

==== TV episodes ====
- "Human" (Stargate Universe)
- "Humans" (Zoboomafoo)
- "Humans", a Series H episode of the television series QI (2010)

==== Characters ====
- Human (Babylon 5), the human race in the fictional world of Babylon 5
- Human (Star Wars), the human race in the fictional world of Star Wars

==== Other uses in film and television ====
- HUMAN, formerly Humanistische Omroep, a Dutch TV channel

=== Music ===
==== Bands ====
- Human (band), a death metal/grindcore band from New Zealand
- Humans (American band), a new wave band from Santa Cruz, California
- Humans (Canadian band), an indie electronic band from Vancouver, British Columbia

==== Albums ====
- Human (Brandy album) or the title song, 2008
- Human (Death album), 1991
- Human (Joell Ortiz and Illmind album) or the title song, 2015
- Human (Leo Ku album) or the title song, 2006
- Human (Masaharu Fukuyama album) or the title song, 2014
- Human (Max Cooper album), 2014
- Human (OneRepublic album), 2021
- Human (Projected album), 2012
- Human (Rag'n'Bone Man album) or the title song (see below), 2017
- Human (Rod Stewart album) or the title song, 2001
- Human (Steve Angello album), 2018
- Human (Three Days Grace album), 2015
- Human (The Veronicas album) or the title song, 2021
- Human (Darren Criss EP) or the title song, 2010
- Human (Dodie EP) or the title song, 2019
- Human, by Gary Numan and Michael R. Smith, 1995
- Human, by Katy Steele, 2016
- Human, by Rachael Lampa, 2010
- Human, by Waylon, 2019
- Humans (album), by Bruce Cockburn, 1980
- Humanz, by Gorillaz, 2017

==== Songs ====
- "Human" (Christina Perri song), 2013
- "Human" (Cody Johnson song), 2022
- "Human" (Goldfrapp song), 2001
- "Human" (The Human League song), 1986
- "Human" (The Killers song), 2008
- "Human" (Oscar Zia song), 2016
- "Human" (Rag'n'Bone Man song), 2016
- "Human" (Robbie Williams song), 2025
- "Human" (Skye Sweetnam song), 2007
- "Human" (Lenny Kravitz song), 2024
- "Human", by C-Tec (Cyber-Tec Project) from Cyber-Tec, 1995
- "Human", by Carpark North from All Things to All People, 2005
- "Human", by the Cheetah Girls from TCG, 2007
- "Human", by Cher Lloyd from Sorry I'm Late, 2014
- "Human", by Civil Twilight from Civil Twilight, 2010
- "Human", by Daughter from If You Leave, 2013
- "Human", by DIIV, 2011
- "Human", by Ellie Goulding from Bright Lights, 2010
- "Human", by Emeli Sandé from Real Life, 2019
- "Human", by Gretta Ray, 2021
- "Human", by Hellyeah from Undeniable, 2016
- "Human", by Imelda May from Life Love Flesh Blood, 2017
- "Human", by Jon McLaughlin from Indiana, 2007
- "Human", by Metallica from S&M, 1999
- "Human", by the Music from The Music, 2002
- "Human", by Of Monsters and Men from Beneath the Skin, 2015
- "Human", by Oh Land from Oh Land, 2011
- "Human", by Ola from Carelessly Yours, 2014
- "Human", by OneRepublic from Oh My My, 2016
- "Human", by the Pretenders covering "Human on the Inside" by the Divinyls, 1999
- "Human", by Sevdaliza from ISON, 2016
- "Human", by Shayne Ward from Obsession, 2010
- "Human", by Stan Walker from All In, 2021
- "Human (Like the Rest of Us)", by Trapt from DNA, 2016
- "Humans" (song), by Vikkstar, 2023

=== Literature ===
- Human?, a 1954 science fiction anthology edited by Judith Merril
- Humans (novel), a 2003 Neanderthal Parallax novel by Robert J. Sawyer
- Humans: A Brief History of How We F*cked It All Up, a 2018 non-fiction book by Tom Phillips

=== Other media ===
- Human (Dungeons & Dragons), the human race in the fictional world of Dungeons & Dragons
- Human Entertainment, a former Japanese computer and video game company
- Human, a playable race in the MMORPG Guild Wars 2

== Places ==
- Human, Iran, a village in Isfahan Province, Iran
- Human, Yazd, a village in Yazd Province, Iran
- Human, Ukraine, a town in Ukraine

== Other uses ==
- Human (surname), a surname of German, English, or Persian origin
- Human Afazeli, Iranian football coach and former player
- Humān, or Houman, a Turanian hero in Shahnameh, the national epic of Greater Iran
- Humanistische Omroep, a Dutch public broadcaster known as HUMAN
- Al-Insan, "Human", 76th chapter (sura) of the Quran
- HUMAN Security, a bot detection company

== See also ==
- Human evolution, the evolutionary process leading up to the appearance of modern humans
- List of human evolution fossils, notable hominin fossil finds relating to human evolution
- Names for the human species
- The Humans (disambiguation)
- Superhuman
- Subhuman (disambiguation)
- Posthuman
- Transhuman
- Inhumans, a Marvel Comic superhero team
- Humanoid, something that has an appearance resembling a human being
- Humanism, a philosophical and ethical stance
- Humanitarianism, a moral of kindness, benevolence, and sympathy extended to all human beings
- Humane (disambiguation)
- Humanity (disambiguation)
- Human scale
