= Humann =

Humann is a surname. Notable people with the surname include:

- Carl Humann (1839–1896), German engineer, architect and archaeologist
- Doug Humann, as of 2021 CEO of Landcare Australia
- Edgar Humann (1838–1914), Chief of Staff of the French Navy in 1894–95
- Georg Humann (1847–1932), German art historian
- Georges Humann (1780–1842), French financier and politician
- Hans Humann (1878–1933), German officer, diplomat and businessman
- Johann Jakob Humann (1771–1834), German Roman Catholic clergyman
- L. Phillip Humann (born 1945), American businessman
- Richard Humann (born 1961), American artist

== See also ==
- Heumann, surname
- Human (surname)
