= Humane (disambiguation) =

Humane usually refers to the virtue of humanity.

Humane may also refer to:

- Humane (film), a 2024 Canadian–American horror thriller film
- Humane Inc., an American consumer electronics company
- Humane Sagar (1990–2025) was an Indian playback singer

== See also ==
- Humain, a Saudi artificial intelligence company
- Humains, a 2009 French horror film
- Humaine, a 2003 album by Hélène Ségara
- Human (disambiguation)
- Humanity (disambiguation)
