= One Tree Hill (Blue Mountains) =

Mountain in the Blue Mountains, Australia

- Location within New South Wales

Highest point
- Elevation: 1,112 m (3,648 ft)
- Coordinates: 33.595318°S 150.257279°E

Geography
- Location: Mount Victoria, New South Wales, Australia
- Parent range: Blue Mountains Range

One Tree Hill is a mountain peak at Mount Victoria in the Blue Mountains of New South Wales. There are two large water tanks surrounded by houses and a wooden sign that reads: "ONE TREE HILL 1111 M.(3645FT) ABOVE SEA LEVEL THE HIGHEST POINT IN THE CITY OF BLUE MOUNTAINS".
