= All Mankind =

Australian rock band

- Origin: Sydney, New South Wales, Australia
- Genres: Indie rock, rock
- Years active: 2007–present
- Labels: SO Records, http://silvaoakmusic.com
- Members: Richard Beeston (vocals, rhythm guitar & keyboard); David Beeston (drums); Daniel "Dorny" Mayes (guitar); Gavin Perkins (bass)
- Website: http://www.allmankind.com

All Mankind is an Australian rock/indie rock band from Eastwood in Sydney, Australia. The group consists of Richard Beeston (vocals, rhythm guitar & keyboard), David Beeston (drums), Daniel "Dorny" Mayes (guitar) and Gavin Perkins (bass)

== Formation ==
The band originally formed with Richard and Dave Beeston and Perkins who used to perform as an acoustic act called the Richard Beeston Band, where they mostly played their own music for high schools and university groups. In 2008 Dorny joined the band as they were looking for a bigger rock-orientated sound. All Mankind took their name from the lyric from Pearl Jam's song, "Mankind", sung by Stone Gossard, in the album No Code.

All Mankind's sound has been compared to the soundscapes of bands such as U2, Coldplay, Muse, Keane, Snow Patrol, The Killers and fellow Australian rock band Powderfinger.

== Early career ==
In 2008 All Mankind went into the studio to record their first album 'Puzzles' with David Nicholas and Peter Mayes. It was released in May 2008. They later released a digital EP of the same name. The resulting EP was supported by Indie 103.1 FM LA, WRXP New York, Motor FM Germany, KNRK- FM Portland and ABC Australia. The album included songs that are now part of All Mankind's repertoire, "I've Been Looking For This" and "Can You Hear Me".

== 2011: Simple Desire ==
In 2011, All Mankind released their album Simple Desire. The lead single from the album, "Break The Spell", received hundreds of spins on radio worldwide including Absolute Radio (UK), ABC Radio (Australia), MotorFM (Germany), KNRK Portland, Indie1031.com, KCMP Minneapolis, WXPN Philadelphia as well as, other stations in Canada, France, Indonesia, Greece, Indonesia, Berlin, Portugal and more, as well as being featured on the soundtrack for EA Sports game, FIFA 12. Subsequent single releases for "Can You Hear Me?" and "Simple Desire" followed.

== 2012-present: after Simple Desire ==
Shortly after the release of Simple Desire, in April 2012, the band released a three-track EP, "Pieces of the Puzzle". This collected two songs from their 2008 debut album ("Pretenders" and "I Am Only") with the new song "This Is A Miracle". In September 2013, in advance of their Worth The Risk tour and the associated EP, they released another single, "Losing Myself".

On 27 January 2016, more than two years after their last new material, All Mankind announced on Facebook that the lyric video for their next single would be posted online in the coming days. On 29 January, they uploaded the video for "Welcome Home".

== Music in other sources ==
All Mankind's tracks have recently been used throughout prime time US TV shows and advertising campaigns. The song "Open Your Eyes" was chosen to promote the ABC series Jamie Oliver's Food Revolution. This promotional campaign was aired during network television during the 2010 Oscars ceremony.

The debut single "Break The Spell" is featured in the EA Sports video game FIFA 12, released 27 September 2011, as well as in the Gossip Girl episode "The End of the Affair".

The track "Hollywood Tonight" has been featured numerous times in the MTV show The Hills. "I’ve Been Looking For This" and "Open your Eyes" were both used on ESPN's coverage of the Australian Tennis Open in 2010.

The single "Can You Hear Me" was featured in the Australian drama series Winners & Losers.

Australian online radio station Triple J Unearthed have added two of All Mankind's songs, "Simple Desire" from the album of the same name and "Losing Myself", to their list.

== Discography ==
ALBUMS
Year	Album	Notes
2008	Puzzles	
2011	Simple Desire	The album was produced and mixed by Mike Crossey, (Arctic Monkeys, Razorlight, The Kooks) at The Motor Museum studios in Liverpool, England. The album was mastered by Robin Schmidt at 24_96 Mastering in Germany.
2013	AMK	Limited edition EP only available at their live shows.

== Singles ==
List of singles, showing year released and album name
Title	Year	Album
"Break The Spell"	2011	Simple Desire
"Can You Hear Me?"	2011	Simple Desire
"Simple Desire"	2011	Simple Desire
"This Is A Miracle"	2012	Non-album
"Pretenders"	2012	Puzzles
"I Am Only"	2012	Puzzles
"Losing Myself"	2013	Non-album
"Welcome Home"	2016	Non-album
