= Human (surname) =

Human is a surname of German, English or Persian origin (in Persian script: هومن, pronunciation as /huːˈmæn/) which is particularly common in South Africa, the United States, Australia, or Iran. In Persian, the surname "Human" (هومن) is distinct from the English term "human," pronounced as /huːˈmæn/ without the "y" glide found in English. It carries cultural connotations of nobility, wisdom, and virtue within Persian tradition. The surname may refer to:

- Ahmad Human (1909–1995), Iranian jurist and politician
- Arjan Human (born 1978), Dutch football forward
- Daan Human (born 1976), South African rugby union footballer
- Dewald Human (born 1995), South African rugby sevens player
- Grace Human (1863–1934), English socialist and portrait artist
- John Human (1912–1991), English cricketer
- Kost Human, South African rugby league footballer
- Pote Human (born 1959), South African rugby union footballer
- Roger Human (1909–1942), English cricketer
- Rowan Human (born 2001), South African football midfielder
- Shirene Human (1980–2025), South African figure skater
- Syed Human (born 1992), Pakistani cross-country skier
- Wylie Human (born 1979), South African rugby union winger

== See also ==
- Humann
