= Subhuman =

Subhuman means "less than human". It may refer to:

- Dehumanization, the denial of full humanness in others and the cruelty and suffering that accompanies it
- Infrahumanisation, the tacitly held belief that one's ingroup is more human than an outgroup, which is less human
- Second-class citizen, a person who is systematically discriminated against within a state or other political jurisdiction, despite their nominal status as a citizen or legal resident there
- Slave, someone forbidden to quit their service for another person and is treated as property
- Untermensch, a term for an "inferior human being" which was originally used by early eugenicists and Nazi racial theorists

== Biology ==
- Fossils now classified as various archaic humans (particularly Neanderthals) were sometimes referred to as proto- or sub-humans in the 19th and early 20th centuries

== Music ==
=== Bands and labels ===
- Subhumans (British band), a British punk rock band
- Subhumans (Canadian band), a Canadian punk rock band
- SubHuman : Human Imprint, an American record label founded by Dieselboy and Steve Gordon

=== Albums ===
- SubHuman, a 2007 album by Recoil

=== Songs ===
- "Subhuman" (song), a song by Garbage
- "Subhuman/Something Came Over Me", a single by Throbbing Gristle
- "Subhuman", a song by Blue Öyster Cult from the album Secret Treaties
- "Subhuman", a song by The Pillows from the album Another Morning, Another Pillows
- "Subhuman", a song by "Cody Mattew Johnson" from Devil May Cry 5 Soundtrack

== Other uses ==
- Humanoid, a non-human creature or being with human form or characteristics
- Last man, the antithesis to the Übermensch in Nietzschean philosophy
- A measure of progress in artificial intelligence, denoting worse performance than most humans
- "Subhuman", was a major retrospective exhibition and sculptural installation by American fashion designer Rick Owens, held at the Triennale di Milano museum in 2017.

== See also ==
- Superhuman (disambiguation)
