= Granny Smith Festival =

Annual festival held in Sydney

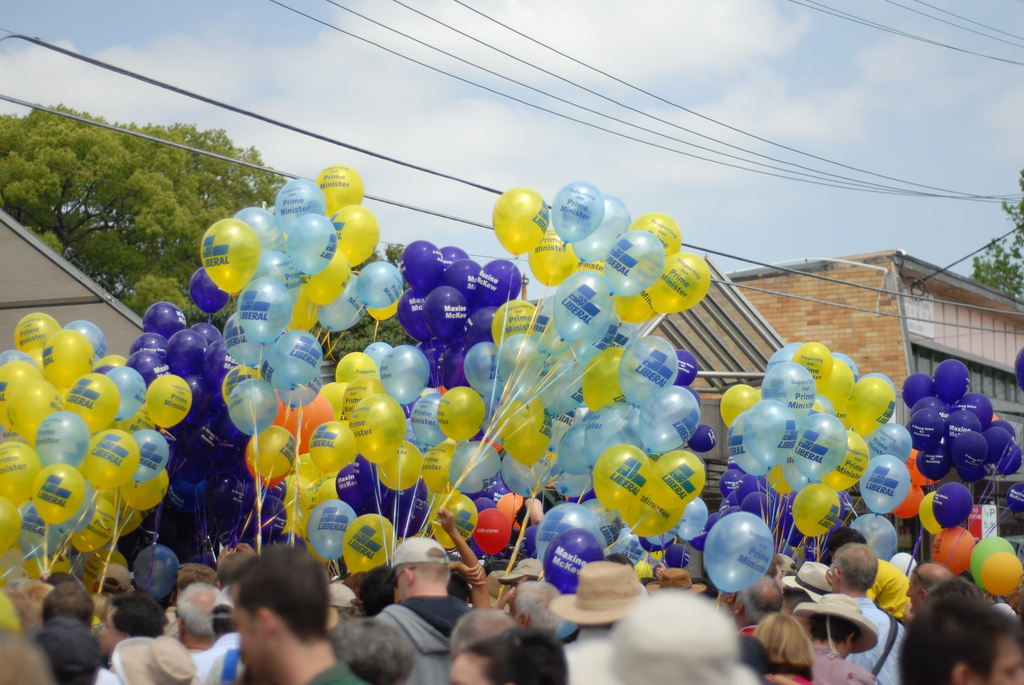
Balloons at Granny Smith Festival demonstrating the extent of the electioneering that occurred in Bennelong at the 2007 federal election.

The Granny Smith Festival is an annual festival held in Eastwood, New South Wales, a suburb of Sydney, Australia. It began in 1985 and is now the largest annual event of its type in Sydney's Northern District, attracting over 80,000 people each year. The festival is held on and around Eastwood Oval on the third Saturday of October to commemorate 19th-century pioneer Maria Ann "Granny" Smith, credited with producing the Granny Smith apple and celebrated for providing the Ryde-Hunters Hill area with prosperity. The festival begins at 9:00 am and concludes at 8:30 pm.

The highlights are the Grand Parade down Rowe Street and the fireworks display. There are also stalls, community events, live entertainment, and rides. It is a festival tradition that the New South Wales Mounted Police lead the Grand Parade.

== Festivals by year ==
=== 2007 ===
The Granny Smith Festival in 2007 was of particular significance, in that it became a major campaign venue for the Australian federal election, 2007. For the first time in the Festival's 22-year history, it was officially opened by the (then) local Member of parliament, Prime minister John Howard. There were speculations that his appearance was largely due to the emergence of a serious challenge towards not just his Coalition government, but indeed his very own parliamentary seat of Bennelong, from high-profile ALP candidate Maxine McKew. Apart from Howard and McKew, a number of other local politicians, along with hundreds of volunteers representing numerous political parties and interest groups, attended the Festival, with a large contingent of media crew following their campaign trails.

=== 2008 ===
The 2008 Granny Smith Festival was of important significance with the Ryde by-election being held on the same day, Saturday October 18. This was triggered by the resignation of John Watkins who was the MP for Ryde since 1995. An estimated 280 stores were set up in the 2008 event.

=== Since 2009 ===
- The 2009 Granny Smith Festival was held on Saturday 17 October with the headline act from Eagles tribute act, Desperado - The Eagles Show.
- The 2010 Granny Smith Festival was held on Saturday 16 October with the headline act from ABBA tribute band, ABBA'S BACK.
- The 2011 Granny Smith Festival was held on Saturday 15 October with the headline act from MOTOWN, The Show!
- The 2012 Granny Smith Festival was held on Saturday 20 October with the headline act from Blues Brothers tribute band, the Australian Blues Brothers Show.
- The 2013 Granny Smith Festival was held on Saturday 19 October with the headline act from Queen tribute band, KillerQueen.
- The 2014 Granny Smith Festival was held on Saturday 18 October with the headline act Roger Galante.
- The 2015 Granny Smith Festival was held on Saturday 17 October.
- The 2016 Granny Smith Festival was held on Saturday 15 October with the headline act "Party Rock People" comprised in part by Jasmine-Jade and Nada-Leigh Nasser.
- The 2018 Granny Smith Festival was held on Saturday 20 October with the festival ending early and scheduled fireworks being cancelled due to severe raining and thunderstorms.
- Festivals since 2020 went on hiatus on grounds of COVID-19 pandemic.
- The 2022 Granny Smith Festival was held on Saturday 15 October with the headline act from Dami Im.

== See also ==
- List of festivals in Australia
