= Humankind (disambiguation) =

Humankind is a term that refers collectively to all human beings.

Humankind may also refer to:

- Humankind (video game), a 2021 strategy game by Amplitude Studios
- Humankind, an American radio show on WGBH (FM)
- "Humankind", a 2021 song on Music of the Spheres (Coldplay album)
- Humankind: A Hopeful History, a 2019 Dutch book by Rutger Bregman

== See also ==
- Ancestors: The Humankind Odyssey, a 2019 survival video game
- Cradle of Humankind, a paleoanthropological site in South Africa
- Origins: The Journey of Humankind, a 2017 American documentary TV series
- Sapiens: A Brief History of Humankind, a 2014 Hebrew book by Yuval Noah Harari
- Temples of Humankind, a series of underground temples in northern Italy
- "The Cradle of Humankind", a song on Flogging Molly's 2011 album, Speed of Darkness
