= Andreas Heumann =

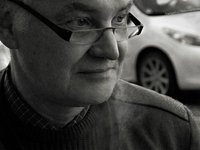
- Andreas Heumann 2007
- Born: Andreas Carl Manuel Heumann; Munich, Germany
- Known for: Painting, Photography, Printmaking

Andreas Heumann (born 1946 in Munich) is a photographer and painter.

Heumann was raised in Switzerland. After leaving school, he began a four-year apprenticeship in Bern to study block-making and printing. He began his career in photography in London via short stints in Paris and New York. His early work was influenced by photographers such as Alfred Stieglitz, Avedon, André Kertész, Weston, Edward Steichen and Henri Cartier-Bresson.

Once in London, he started to do reportage and fashion photography working on assignments for magazines such as Stern, Vogue, Twen, Harper's Magazine and many others. Since then he has worked on over twelve hundred advertising campaigns, both national and international.

Heumann said during an interview in Techniques of Masters: "A bad picture will always be a bad picture, no technique will save or improve it. It is not style or technique that makes the image. It is the thought and the interpretation of an experience in life, our seven senses, which have to be translated into a picture. The technique is only a tool for enhancement of a thought".

== Awards ==
- Medaille d'argent, Voluntary Fire Brigade of Niederwunsen, SE Germany 2017
- Accepted by the Royal Academy of Arts 2007
- The Association of Photographers (UK): a record number of 6 Gold Awards, 6 Silver Awards, 15 Merit Awards and 3 Judges Choice Awards from the beginning the Awards have been running up to 2006. In 1990 he was honored to be a judge - no work entered.
- Prize winner of the Cannes Advertising Festival 98 - Gold & Silver Awards
- Prize winner of the John Kobal Portrait Awards 95
- Golden Cardboard Git Award of Arts 1996
- Communications Arts - Award of Excellence 94
- The New York Art Directors Club 94 - Merit Award
- Agfa Picture of the Year 94
- Art Director Club Italy 1993 (Gold for best Advertising picture)
- World Image Awards (USA) 1992 - Winner of Fine Art Photography Category
- Campaign Press Awards 1991 (UK) - 1 Gold Award, 5 Silver Awards
- Art Director's Club of France 1990 - Silver Award
- Art Director's Club of Switzerland 1990 - Silver Award
- Art Director's Club of New York 1988 - Gold Award
- Frankfurt Book Fair 1979 - (Germany) Golden Letter Award for best 50 Books of the year.

== Publications ==
Augenblick (Ger. n.) - a moment of time; a blink.

Augenblick is partly autobiographical, and its photographs draw on Heumann's own experiences and reflections on his life. In addition to his photographic work, he began painting in 1999. His paintings make prominent use of color and draw on the work of Modigliani and Picasso.

== Exhibitions ==
- 7–10 June 2007 - Royal Academy of Arts (London, England, UK)
- 8–11 June 2007 - Hackwood Art Festival
- 8–13 October 2007 - Solo Exhibition, The Gallery, Cork Street, London W1 (Photographs and Paintings).
