= Humans: A Brief History of How We F*cked It All Up =

2018 non-fiction book by Tom Phillips

- First edition
- Author: Tom Phillips
- Publisher: Headline Publishing Group (Wildfire), Hanover Square Press
- Publication date: 2018
- Media type: print
- Pages: 282
- ISBN: 9781472259028

Humans: A Brief History of How We F*cked It All Up is a 2018 non-fiction book by Tom Phillips, published by Headline Publishing Group in the United Kingdom, and Hanover Square Press in the United States. Phillips is the editor of the fact-checking organisation Full Fact.

Phillips argues that humans are generally more prone to error than they are to achievement. His first example is the fossilised hominid Lucy, who he says would never have been discovered were it not for her error. He also mentions Adolf Hitler, stating that his government was poorly operated. Kirkus Reviews stated that profanity – the word fuck – is a frequent element in the book, and describes it as "Al Gore by way of Monty Python". Times News Network of The Times of India concurred with the statement about profanity and added that the book's style is "entertaining" with a "quite breezy" "narrative technique" and a conversational style.

Phillips is also the author of Truth: A Brief History of Total Bullsh*t (Wildfire, 2019).
