= Humanity World International =

Nonprofit organization in Accra, Ghana

Humanity World International (hwi), founded in 2004, is a nonprofit, non-denominational international volunteering and intern organization based in Accra, Ghana. HWI arranges specific work placements for international volunteers, interns and students worldwide. In addition to its volunteer and internship projects, it undertakes donor-funded projects, including advocacy, human rights campaigns, research and humanitarian projects.

Humanity World International works in the fields of education, health, human rights, advocacy and research.
