= Superman (disambiguation) =

Superman (also known as Clark Kent and Kal-El) is a DC comic book superhero. The Superman franchise is a media franchise based on the character.

Superman may also refer to:

== The Superman franchise ==
=== Comic books and strips ===
- Superman (comic book), 1939–present
  - Superman vol. 2, 1987–2006
  - Superman (Volume 3), 2011–2016
- Superman (comic strip), a newspaper comic strip, 1939–1966

=== Fictional characters ===
- Superman (1978 film series character)
- Superman (DC Extended Universe)
- Superman (Earth-One), the Silver Age incarnation of Superman
- Superman (Earth-Two), an alternate version of the fictional superhero
- Superman (Kal Kent), the Superman of the 853rd century
- Superman (Kingdom Come), an alternate version of Superman
- Superman (Hernan Guerra), an alternate version of Chris Kent
- Clark Kent (Superman & Lois)
- Superman (Jon Kent), the son and successor of Clark Kent
- Kong Kenan, the Super-Man of China

=== Film ===
- Superman (1940s animated film series)
  - Superman (1941 film), the first film in the 1940s animated series
- Superman (serial), a 1948 film serial
- Superman (1978 film), also called Superman: The Movie, starring Christopher Reeve as the DC Comics superhero
- Superman (1980 film), an Indian Telugu-language film
- Superman (1987 film), an Indian Hindi-language film
- Superman (1997 film), an Indian Malayalam-language film
- Superman (2025 film), featuring the DC Comics superhero

=== Television ===
- Adventures of Superman (TV series), 1952-1958
- Superman (TV series), 1988
- Superman: The Animated Series, 1996–2000
- My Adventures with Superman, 2023-present

=== Gaming ===
- Superman (pinball), released by Atari in 1979
- Superman (1979 video game), for the Atari 2600
- Superman (1987 video game), for the NES
- Superman (1988 video game), an arcade game
- Superman (1992 video game), for the Mega Drive/Genesis
- Superman 64, or Superman: The New Superman Adventures, 1999, for the Nintendo 64

== Other fictional characters ==
- Bill the superman, a character in the short story ‘’The Manhood of Edward Robinson’’ by Agatha Christie, 1924
- Bill Dunn or the Superman, a character from The Reign of the Superman by Jerry Siegel, 1933
- Superman (Psychomech), a fictional race in the novel Psychomech

== Music ==
=== Albums ===
- Superman (Arash album), 2014
- Superman (Gary Chaw album), 2006
- Superman (Barbra Streisand album), 1977
- Superman, by Machi, 2005
- Superman: The Best of the RCA Years, 1979, by Alison MacCallum

=== Songs ===
- "Superman" (Black Lace song), 1981
- "Superman" (Donna Fargo song), 1972
- "Superman" (Eminem song), 2003
- "Superman (Goldfinger song)", 1997, notable for being featured in the Tony Hawk's skateboarding video game series
- "Superman" (Keith Urban song), 2020
- "Superman" (Lazlo Bane song), 2000, the original opening theme of Scrubs
- "Superman" (Morgan Wallen song), 2025
- "Superman" (Pepe Luis Soto song), released by Celi Bee and the Buzzy Bunch, 1977
- "Superman" (Stereophonics song), 2005
- "Superman" (The Clique song), 1969, covered by R.E.M. in 1986
- "Superman", by Crystal Kay from the 2012 album Vivid
- "Superman", by Gabriella Cilmi from the 2010 album Ten
- "Superman", by the Game from the 2008 album LAX
- "Superman", by Rachel Platten from the 2016 album Wildfire
- "Superman", by Sachin Gupta, Sukhwinder Singh, Jaspreet Jasz and Kshitij Tarey from the 2012 Indian film Will You Marry Me?
- "Superman", by Sea Girls from the 2024 album Midnight Butterflies
- "Superman", by Skee-Lo from the 1995 album I Wish
- "Superman", by Taylor Swift from the 2010 album Speak Now
- "Superman", by Unwritten Law from the 1996 album Oz Factor
- "Superman (It's Not Easy)", by Five for Fighting, 2001
- "Superman (Meets The Man Of Steel)", by Chalk Circle from the 1996 album The Great Lake
- "(Wish I Could Fly Like) Superman", by the Kinks, 1979
- "O Superman", 1981, by Laurie Anderson
- "Superman's Song", 1991, by the Crash Test Dummies

== People with the nickname Superman ==
- Supaman, an Apsáalooke rapper and fancy war dancer
- Gianluigi Buffon (born 1978), Italian football player
- John Cena (born 1977), WWE professional wrestler
- Sam Fuld (born 1981), American Major League Baseball player and General Manager
- Dennis Hallman (born 1975), American MMA fighter
- Dwight Howard (born 1985), American National Basketball Association player
- Miguel Ángel López (born 1994), Colombian cyclist
- Cam Newton (born 1989), American football player
- Shaquille O'Neal (born 1972), American retired National Basketball Association player
- Art Pennington (1923–2017), American retired Negro league baseball player
- Armen Petrosyan (fighter) (born 1990), Russian-Armenian MMA fighter
- Sean Rosenthal (born 1980), American beach volleyball player

== Roller coasters ==
- Superman: Escape from Krypton, at Six Flags Magic Mountain
- Superman – Ride of Steel, at Six Flags America
- Superman: Ultimate Flight, at various Six Flags parks
  - Superman: Ultimate Flight (Six Flags Discovery Kingdom)

== Sport and racing ==
- Superman, a type of cycling stunt
  - The superman as used by Mat Rempits
- The superman, a cycling position created by Graeme Obree

== Other uses ==
- Superman (gene), a plant gene in Arabidopsis thaliana
- Superman (ice cream flavor)
- Übermensch, sometimes translated as Superman, a concept of Nietzsche
- Superman: The Life of Frederick the Great, a 1931 book by Nathan Ausubel

== See also ==
- Adventures of Superman (disambiguation)
- Superman: The Man of Steel (disambiguation)
- Superman Returns (disambiguation)
- New man (disambiguation)
- Superboy (disambiguation)
- Supergirl (disambiguation)
- Superhero (disambiguation)
- Superhuman (disambiguation)
- Superwoman (disambiguation)
- Suparman (disambiguation)
- Supermen (disambiguation)
