= Foliatus =

Foliatus, a Latin word meaning leafy, may refer to:

- Foliatus Worm, a subclass of worms in the Kamen Rider series
- Holonothrus foliatus, Wallwork, 1963, a mite species in the genus Holonothrus and the family Crotoniidae found in Antarctica
- Paraamblyseius foliatus, Corpuz-Raros, 1994, a mite species in the genus Paraamblyseius and the family Phytoseiidae
- Tmarus foliatus, Lessert, 1928, a crab spider species in the genus Tmarus found in Africa and the Comoro Islands

== See also ==
- Foliata (disambiguation)
- Foliatum (disambiguation)
- bifoliatus
  - Culex bifoliatus Duret & Baretto, 1956, a species in the genus Culex found in Brazil
- infoliatus
  - Culex infoliatus, Bonne-Wepster & Bonne, 1919, a species in the genus Culex first described by J Bonne-Wepster & C Bonne and found in Brazil, Ecuador, Peru, Suriname, Venezuela and French Guiana
- quadrifoliatus
  - Culex quadrifoliatus, Komp, 1936, a species in the genus Culex found in Panama
- trifoliatus
  - Culex trifoliatus, Edwards, 1914, a species in the genus Culex found in Ethiopia, Ghana, Kenya, Namibia, South Africa, Sudan, Uganda and Zaire
