= DEFICIENS =

Gene that regulates floral architecture

DEFICIENS is a gene that regulates floral architecture.

Examples of DEFICIENS genes include:

- Various genes discussed at ABC model of flower development§DEFICIENS
- Antirrhinum majus DEFICIENS
- Elaeis guineensis DEFICIENS
