= Clark Kent (disambiguation) =

Clark Kent is the secret alter-ego of DC Comics character Superman.

Clark Kent may also refer to:

== Versions of Superman in other media ==
- Superman (1978 film series character), the fictional character in the Warner Bros. Superman film series
- Clark Kent (Superman & Lois), the fictional character in the Arrowverse television franchise
- Superman (DC Extended Universe), the fictional character of the DC Extended Universe film series
- Clark Kent (Smallville), the fictional character of the television series Smallville

== People with the name Clark Kent or Klark Kent ==
- Clark Kent (producer), hip hop producer
- Klark Kent (graffiti artist), German graffiti artist and music producer
- Klark Kent, pseudonym under which American musician Stewart Copeland released four singles
  - Klark Kent (album), a solo album released under the same pseudonym

== Other uses ==
- Clark-Kent, a defunct Colorado-based bicycle manufacturer
