= Supermen =

Supermen may refer to:

- Supermen (anthology), edited by Isaac Asimov et al., 1984
- "The Supermen", a song by David Bowie, 1970
- Supermen, a 1979 album by Ferrante & Teicher
- 18th Division (South Vietnam) of the Army of the Republic of Vietnam, known as "The Supermen"

== See also ==
- Superman (disambiguation)
- Suparman (disambiguation)
