= Superboy (disambiguation) =

Superboy is a DC Comics superhero.

Superboy or Super Boy may also refer to:

== DC Comics ==
- Superboy (comic book), comic book series by DC Comics featuring Superboy
- DC Comics characters who have assumed the mantle of Superboy
  - Superboy (Kal-El), Superman's younger self
  - Conner Kent, Superman's teenage clone
  - Superboy-Prime, an alternate universe version of Superman
  - Jon Lane Kent, the son of Superman and Lois Lane from an alternate timeline
  - Jon Kent (DC Comics), the present-day son of Superman and Lois Lane

== TV series ==
- Superboy (TV series), a 1980s television series based on the DC Comics character Superboy
- Super Boy (TV series), a Chinese reality singing competition
- Superboy, a 2010 Indonesian drama TV series starring Hengky Kurniawan and Julia Perez
- Clark Kent (Smallville), a character on the 2000s television series Smallville

== See also ==
- Super Boy Allan, an educational video game
- Superman (disambiguation)
- Supergirl (disambiguation)
- Clark Kent (disambiguation)
