= Foliatum =

Foliatum, a Latin word meaning leafy, may refer to:

- Anthurium scherzerianum var. foliatum, a flowering plant variety in the species Anthurium scherzerianum and the genus Anthurium
- Ceratostoma foliatum, a species of medium to large sea snail
- Heliotropium foliatum, a flowering plant species in the genus Heliotropium
- Murphydium foliatum, a spider species in the genus Murphydium and the family Linyphiidae

== See also ==
- Foliata (disambiguation)
- Foliatus (disambiguation)
