= Foliata =

Foliata, a Latin word meaning leafy, may refer to:

- Papilla foliata, the Latin name for a type of taste bud on the tongue

== species Latin names ==
- Dipoena foliata, Keyserling, 1886, a spider species in the genus Dipoena and the family Theridiidae found in Brazil
- Galeola foliata (F.Muell.) F.Muell., an orchid species in the genus Galeola : see also List of Australian plant species authored by Ferdinand von Mueller
- Libellula foliata (Kirby, 1889), a dragonfly species in the genus Libellula found in Mexico

== See also ==
- Foliatum (disambiguation)
- Foliatus (disambiguation)
- Defoliata
  - Boronia defoliata, F.Muell., an Australian plant species authored by Ferdinand von Mueller in the genus Boronia
  - Peperomia defoliata, a species in the genus Peperomia
- Efoliata
  - Indigofera efoliata, F.Muell., an Australian plant species authored by Ferdinand von Mueller in the genus Indigofera
  - Tetratheca efoliata, F.Muell., an Australian plant species authored by Ferdinand von Mueller in the genus Tetratheca
- Trifoliata
  - Indigofera trifoliata, a species in the genus Indigofera
