= Suparman (disambiguation) =

Suparman is a given name. Notable persons with this name as a patrynomic (which may become a surname in the West) include:

- Suparman (1913–1948), first minister of justice of the state of Pasundan
- Aang Suparman (born 1984), Indonesian footballer
- Rusdi Suparman (born 1973), Malaysian footballer
- Suparman, a character in the novel Code of Honor by Marc Cameron

== See also ==
- Superman (disambiguation)
