= Celi Bee =

American disco musician

- Born: Celida Ines Camacho; New York, US
- Occupation: Singer
- Instrument: Vocals
- Years active: 1960s - present
- Labels: TK Records; Top Hits

Celi Bee (born Celida Ines Camacho, New York City) is an American disco musician.

== Career ==
Bee is a New York-born singer of Puerto Rican parents. Born in New York, she initially relocated back to Puerto Rico with her parents. There she met Pepe Luis Soto in Puerto Rico in the 1960s and they began making music together. In 1972, she won a festival called Festival De La Voz y La Cancion, with the song, "Yo Quiero Un Pincel. She was initially popular in Spain, and Puerto Rico where her single, "Half A Love", became successful.

In 1977 she signed a recording contract with TK Records, whilst Soto wrote a song called "Superman". The song, credited to Celi Bee and the Buzzy Bunch, became a hit, reaching #3 on the US Billboard Hot Dance Music/Club Play Singles chart, #41 on the Billboard Hot 100 and #86 on the R&B chart. The album, Celi Bee and the Buzzy Bunch, an extended six track set, reached #39 on the R&B listing and #169 on the main Billboard 200 album chart. Other tracks off the album included "One Love", "Smile", "Its Sad", "Closer Closer" and "Hurt Me Hurt Me". The Buzzy Bunch were her backing group, composed of only Soto and his studio musicians. "Superman" later became a hit for Herbie Mann (#26, Hot 100).

Bee's next album was Alternating Currents (1978). This featured the hits, "Macho (a Real Real One)", which made #23 on the US Hot Dance Music/Club Play chart, "Hold Your Horses, Babe" which peaked at #72 in the UK Singles Chart in June 1978, and "Coming Up Strong". The album sleeve featured Bee alone without the Buzzy Bunch. Ullanda McCullough sang as a backing vocalist, and the strings were arranged by Irving Spice. Her follow-up album, Fly Me on the Wings of Love 's title track peaked at #16 on the US Dance chart. The album also featured "Boomerang" and "For the Love of My Man", the former written by Bee. Her final album was Blow My Mind (1980), whose title track reached #29 in the US Dance chart. Around this time, Soto and Bee divorced.

Like so many disco artists, the popularity of Celi Bee waned in the 1980s. However she did continue to record with sporadic singles like "I'm Free" (1983) and an album Como Agua y Arena (1986). The disco albums she released have all been re-released on CD, firstly by Hot Productions and, more recently, on Disconnected.

In February 2007, her greatest hits compilation album was issued by Disconnected.

== Discography ==
=== Albums ===
| Year | Album | Chart positions | | |
| Year | Album | US | US R&B | AUS |
|---|---|---|---|---|
| 1977 | Celi Bee & The Buzzy Bunch | 39 | 169 | - |
| 1978 | Alternating Currents | - | - | - |
| 1978 | Fly Me On The Wings Of Love | - | - | 93 |
| 1979 | Blow My Mind | - | - | - |
| 1986 | Como Agua Y Arena | - | - | - |

=== Charted Singles ===
| Year | Title | Chart positions | | | | |
| Year | Title | US | US Dance | US R&B | AUS | UK |
|---|---|---|---|---|---|---|
| 1977 | "Superman" | 41 | 3 | 86 | 92 | - |
| 1978 | "Macho (A Real, Real One)" | - | 23 | - | - | - |
| 1978 | "Hold Your Horses, Babe" | - | - | - | - | 72 |
| 1979 | "Blow My Mind" | - | 29 | - | - | - |
| 1979 | "Fly Me on the Wings of Love" | - | 16 | - | - | - |
| 1983 | "I'm Free" | - | 66 | - | - | - |
| 1987 | "I Can't Let Go" | - | 16 | - | - | - |
