= Supergirl (disambiguation) =

Supergirl is a DC Comics superhero character.

Supergirl or Super Girl may also refer to:

== DC Comics characters and series ==
- Supergirl (Kara Zor-El), Superman's cousin, a survivor of Krypton, and the most popular version of Supergirl
- Supergirl (Matrix), an other-dimensional shapeshifter
- Supergirl (Linda Danvers), an Earth-born angel
- Supergirl (Cir-El), Superman's daughter from an alternate timeline
- Supergirl (Arrowverse), an adaptation of Kara in the Arrowverse television franchise
- Other alternative versions of Supergirl in the DC Comics multiverse
- Supergirl (comic book), a series featuring various characters called "Supergirl"
- Supergirl: Cosmic Adventures in the Eighth Grade, a series featuring Lena Thorul, the thirteen-year-old sister of Lex Luthor, who attends the same boarding school as Kara Zor-El

== Film and television ==
=== Film ===
- Supergirl (1973 film), a 1973 Filipino film
- Supergirl (1984 film), based on the character Kara Zor-El
- Supergirl (2026 film), based on the character Kara Zor-El
- Supergirl – Das Mädchen von den Sternen, a 1971 German film
- Super, Girls!, a 2007 Chinese documentary by Jian Yi

=== Television ===
- Supergirl (TV series), a 2015 American television series based on the character Kara Zor-El
- Super Girl (TV series), a 2004 Chinese singing competition show
- The Super Girl, a 1979 Japanese television crime drama

== Music ==
=== Bands ===
- Super Girls (Hong Kong band), a Hong Kong idol pop group
- Super Girls (Japanese band), a Japanese idol pop group

=== Albums ===
- Super Girl (album), 2011, by Kara
- Super Girl (EP), 2009, by Super Junior-M

=== Songs ===
- "Supergirl" (Reamonn song), 2000
- "Supergirl" (Saving Jane song), 2008
- "Supergirl" (Hannah Montana song), 2009, by Miley Cyrus as Hannah Montana
- "Super Girl" (Super Junior song), 2009
- "Supergirl" (Stefania song), 2020 (the Greek entry for the Eurovision Song Contest 2020)
- "Supergirl", 1965, by The Fugs from The Fugs First Album
- "Super Girl", 1966, by Graham Bonney
- "Supergirl", 1976, by Johnny Cougar from Chestnut Street Incident
- "Super Girl", 1988, by Yasuyuki Okamura from the anime television series City Hunter 2
- "Supergirl", 1997, by Stereo Total from Monokini
- "Supergirl", 1998, by Miss Papaya
- "Supergirl", 2000, by Folder 5
- "Supergirl!", 2001, by Krystal Harris from Me & My Piano
- "Supergirl", by Springbok Nude Girls on the 2001 album The Fat Lady Sings: Best of the Springbok Nude Girls 1995-2001
- "Supergirl", 2005, by Hilary Duff from Most Wanted
- "Supergirl (Demonstrations Skizze)", 2005, by Kashmir from No Balance Palace
- "Super Girl", 2006, by Gin Blossoms from Major Lodge Victory
- "Supergirl", 2006, by Minor Majority
- "Supergirl", 2008, by Kate Miller-Heidke from Curiouser
- "Super Girl", 2010, by Yuna Kim
- "Super Girl", 2013, by Ladies' Code from Code 01 Bad Girl

== Other ==
- SuperGirls Championship, later renamed as the ECCW Women's Championship, a wrestling competition
- Super Girls FC, a Lebanese women's association football club

== See also ==
- Power Girl (Kara Zor-L), a character closely related to Supergirl
- Laurel Gand, a character created as a replacement for Supergirl
- Superwoman, the name of several characters from DC Comics, most of which are roughly similar to Supergirl
- Superman (disambiguation)
- Superboy (disambiguation)
