= The Return of Superman =

The Return of Superman may refer to:

- The Return of Superman (South Korean TV program), a South Korean TV series
- The Return of Superman, a DC Comics title
- Superman Returns, a 2006 American superhero film

== See also ==
- Return of Mr. Superman, a 1960 Indian Hindi-language superhero film
- Superman Returns (disambiguation)
