= Superhero (disambiguation) =

A superhero is a archetype.

Superhero or superheroes may also refer to:

== Music ==
- Super Heroines, an American deathrock band
- Superheroes (band), a Danish pop rock band
- Superhero (musical), by Tom Kitt and John Logan

=== Albums ===
- Superhero (Brian McKnight album), 2001
- Superhero (Stephen Lynch album), 2003
- Superhero (Shoshana Bean album), 2008
- Superhero (Jed Madela album), 2019
- Superheroes (EP), a 2005 EP by Edguy
- Superheroes (Racer X album), 2000
- Superheroes (Dani Harmer album), 2009

=== Songs ===
- "Super Hero" (Shiritsu Ebisu Chugaku song)
- "Super Hero" (VIXX song)
- "Superhero" (Gary Barlow song)
- "Superhero" (Daze song)
- "Superhero" (Viki Gabor song)
- "Superheroes" (song), by the Script
- "Superhero" (Metro Boomin, Future and Chris Brown song)
- "Superhero", by Anthrax from We've Come for You All
- "Superhero", by Cher Lloyd from Sticks + Stones
- "Superhero", by Garrison Starr
- "Superhero", by Jane's Addiction, the theme song to the TV series Entourage
- "Superhero", by Simon Curtis from RA
- "Superhero", by Sophia & A-Lo, the official song of the 2013 CONCACAF Gold Cup
- "Superhero", by Flobots from Survival Story
- "Superheroes", by Daft Punk from Discovery
- "Superheroes", by The Firm
- "Super Hero", by Lower Than Atlantis from Lower Than Atlantis
- "Super Hero", by Stereo Fuse from Stereo Fuse
- "Super Hero", a 2020 music video by Atreyu

== Other uses ==
- Real-life superhero
- Superhero Movie, 2008 comedy film
- Superheroes (film), 2021 Italian film
- Superheroes: A Never-Ending Battle, 2013 documentary television series
- Dragon Ball Super: Super Hero, 2022 Japanese animated film
- Marvel Super Heroes (disambiguation), various Marvel Comics series and a television show
- The World's Greatest Superheroes, DC Comics newspaper comic strip
- Superhero fiction, subgenre of science fiction
- "Super Hero", an episode of the Adult Swim animated television series, Aqua Teen Hunger Force
- "Superheroes", an episode from Ben & Holly's Little Kingdom
- Super Hero Time, programming block on TV Asahi
- Super Hero (film), a 2018 Bangladeshi film featuring Shakib Khan.

== See also ==
- Superhuman, an entity with intelligence or abilities exceeding normal human standards
- Superman (disambiguation)
