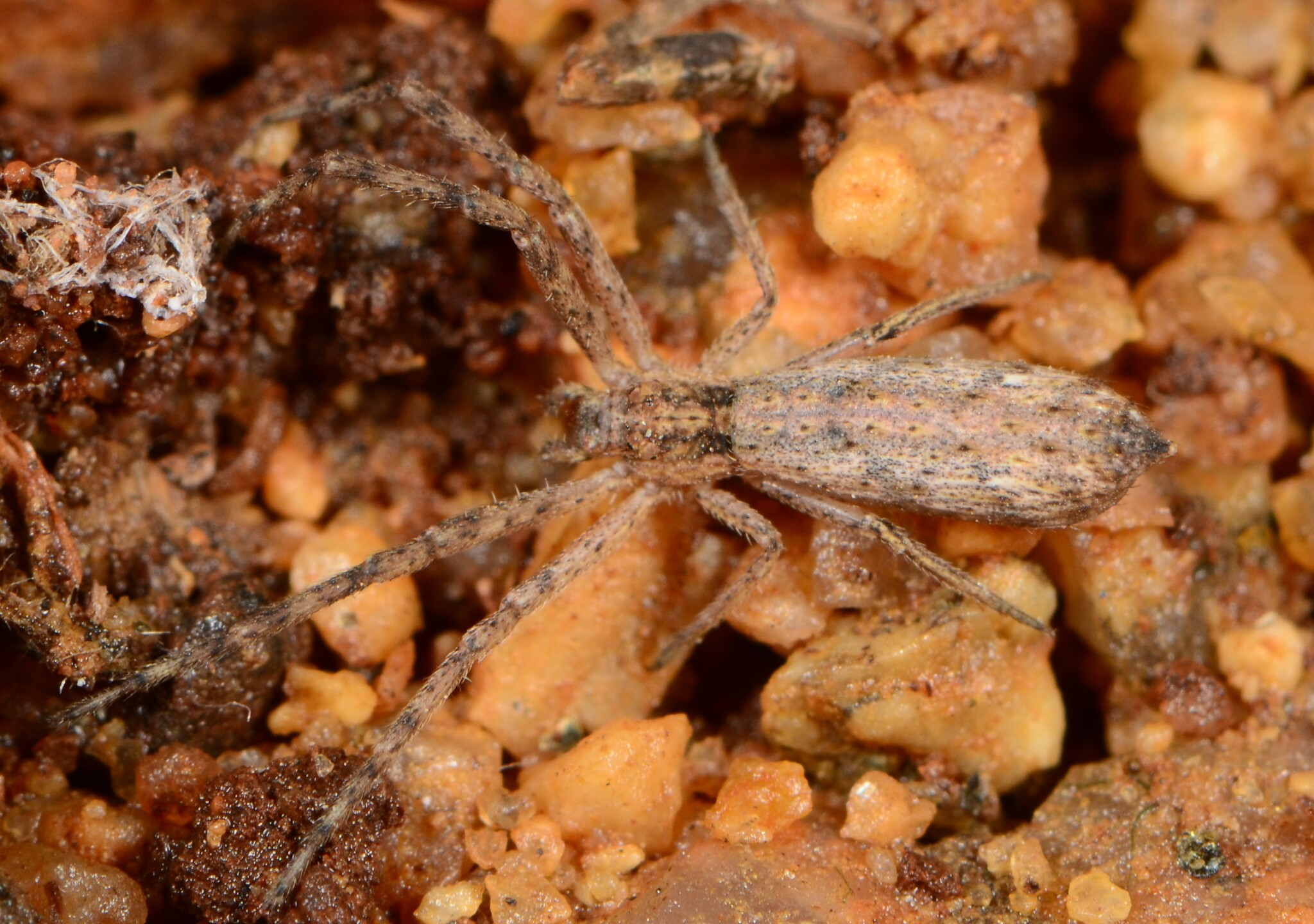
- female
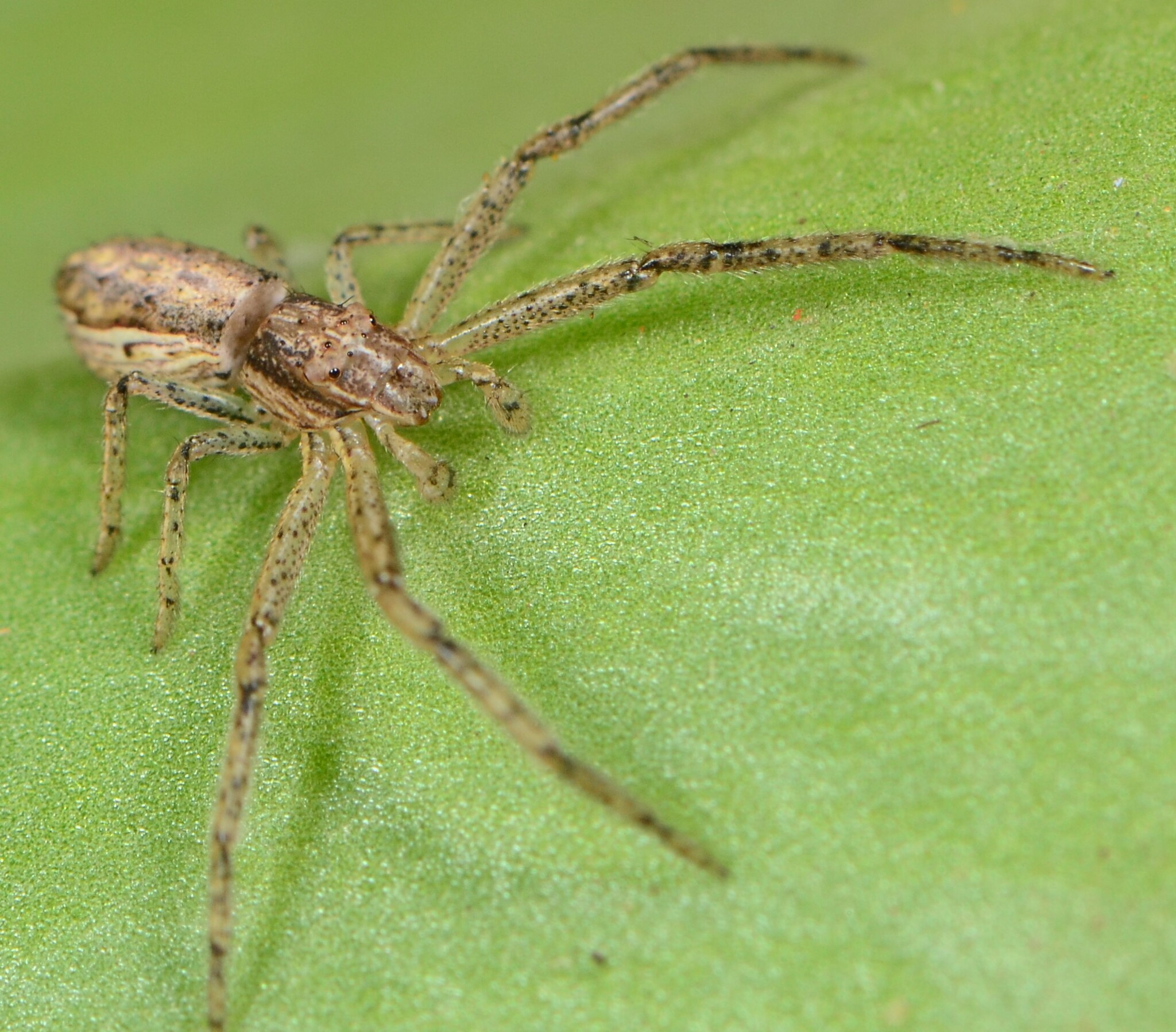
- juvenile male

Scientific classification
- Kingdom: Animalia
- Phylum: Arthropoda
- Subphylum: Chelicerata
- Class: Arachnida
- Order: Araneae
- Infraorder: Araneomorphae
- Family: Thomisidae
- Genus: Tmarus
- Species: T. foliatus

Binomial name
- Tmarus foliatus Lessert, 1928

= Tmarus foliatus =

Short bum Tmarus crab spider

Species of crab spider

Tmarus foliatus is a species of crab spider in the family Thomisidae. It is widely distributed across Africa, from Senegal in the west to South Africa in the south. The species is commonly known as the short bum Tmarus crab spider due to its distinctive opisthosoma shape.

== Name ==
The specific name is from Latin foliatus "leafy, having leaves", referring to the spider's "folium", a broad leaf-like marking along the medial line of the top of the abdomen.

== Distribution ==
Tmarus foliatus has been recorded from nine African countries: Senegal, Ivory Coast, Democratic Republic of the Congo, Burundi, Tanzania, Zimbabwe, Lesotho, South Africa, and the Comoros. In South Africa, the species is found across eight provinces and is considered of Least Concern conservation status.

== Habitat ==
The species is free-living on plants and is usually found on trees. It has been sampled from various biomes including Fynbos, Forest, Grassland, Indian Ocean Coastal Belt, and Savanna, as well as in sugar cane fields. Adults have been collected from grass, sugar cane, and soil, particularly during June to December on Grande Comore Island.

== Description ==
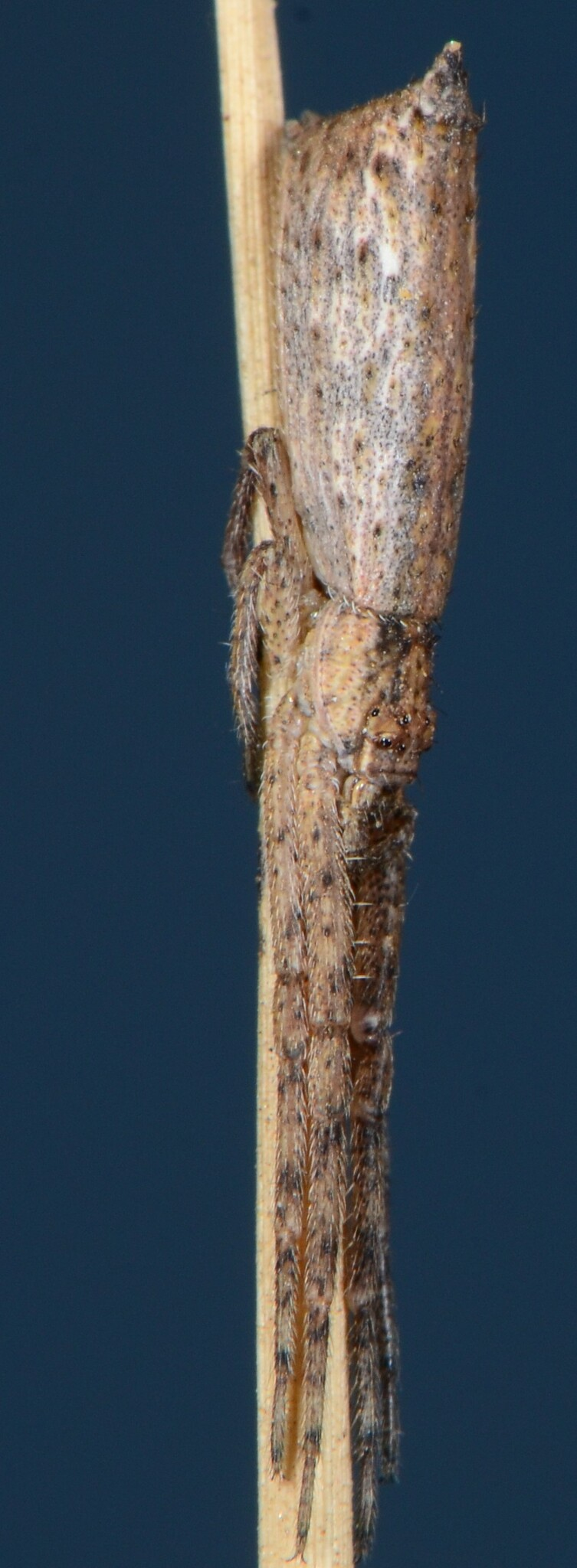
female

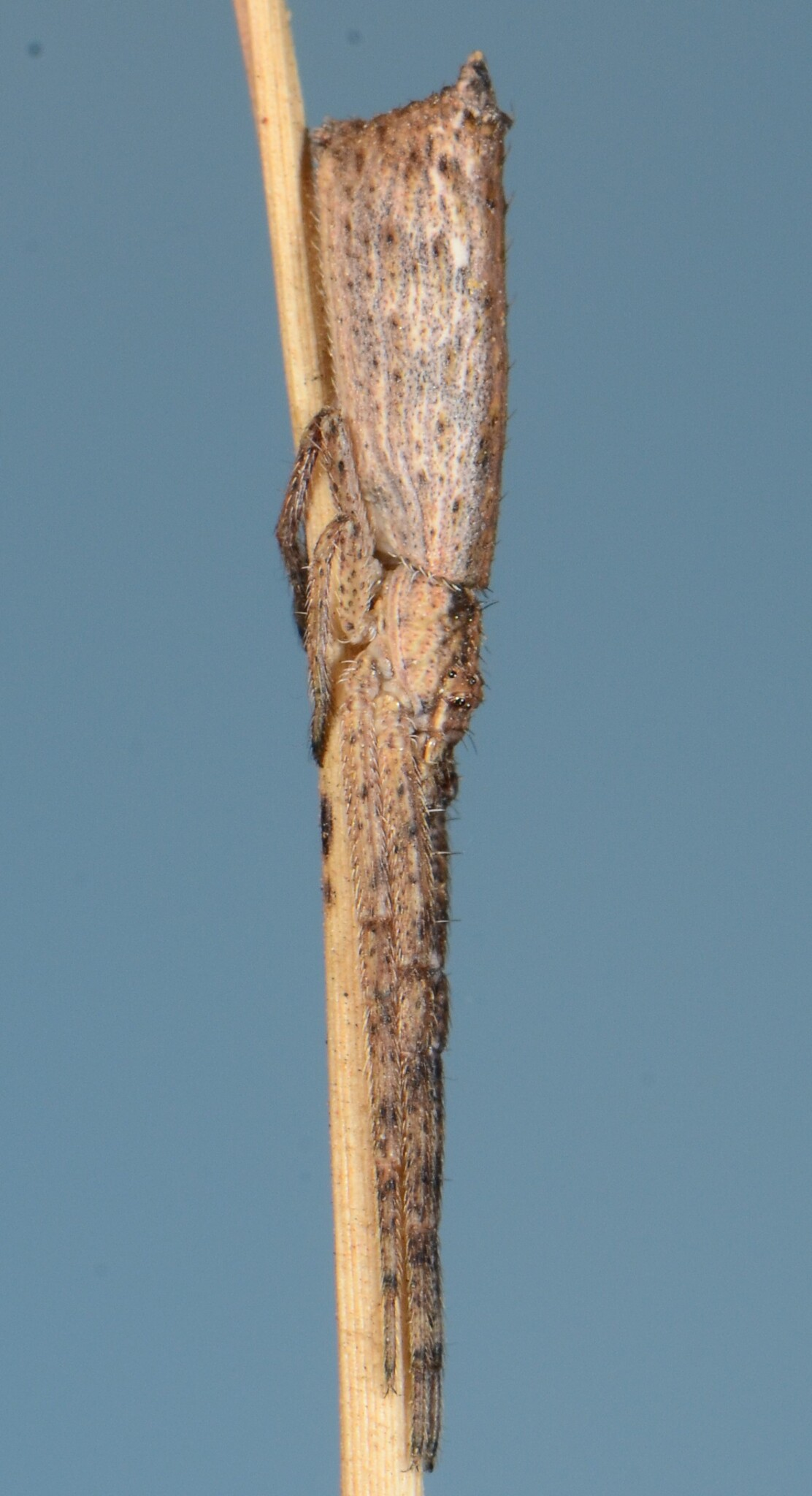
female

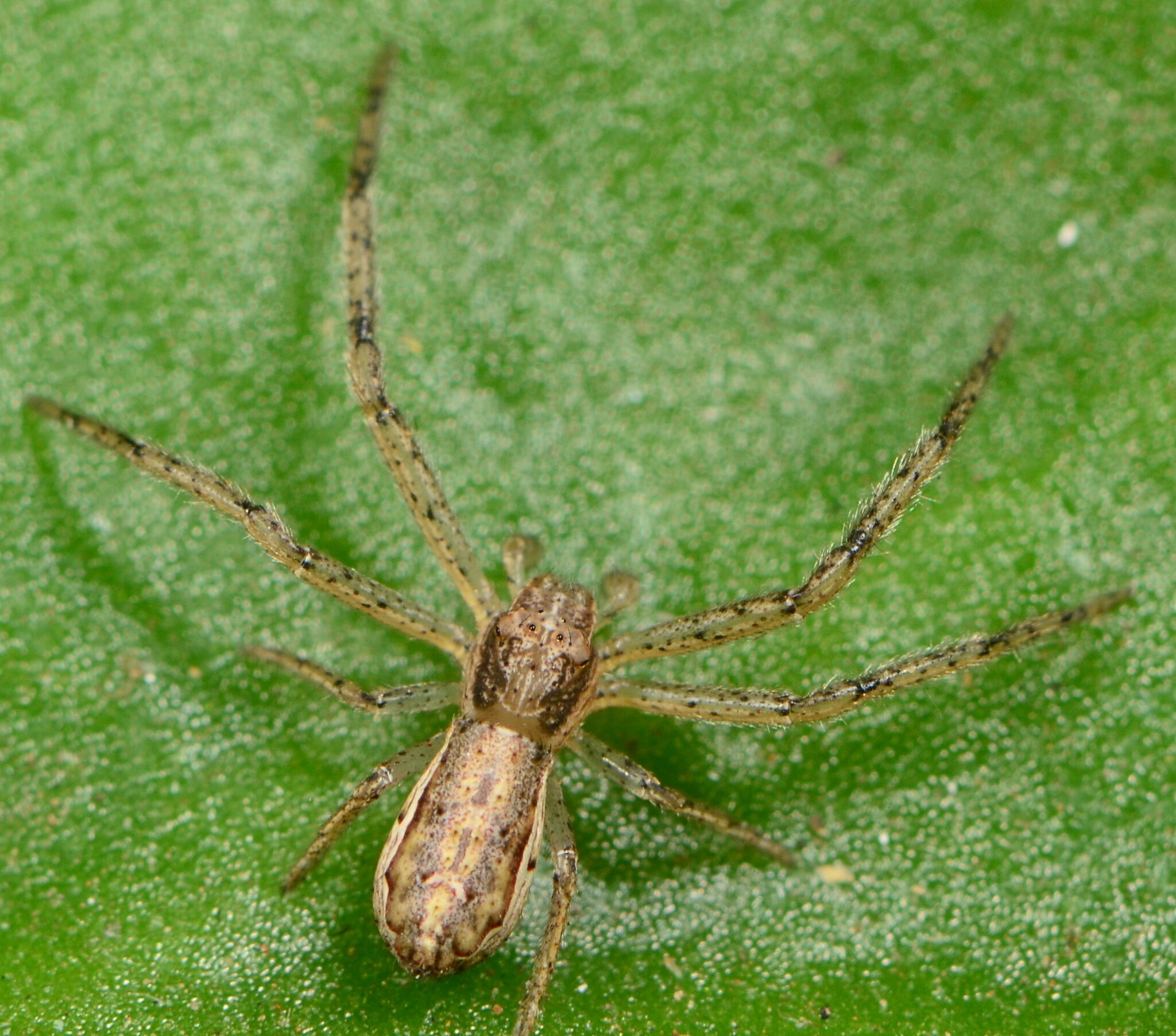
juvenile male

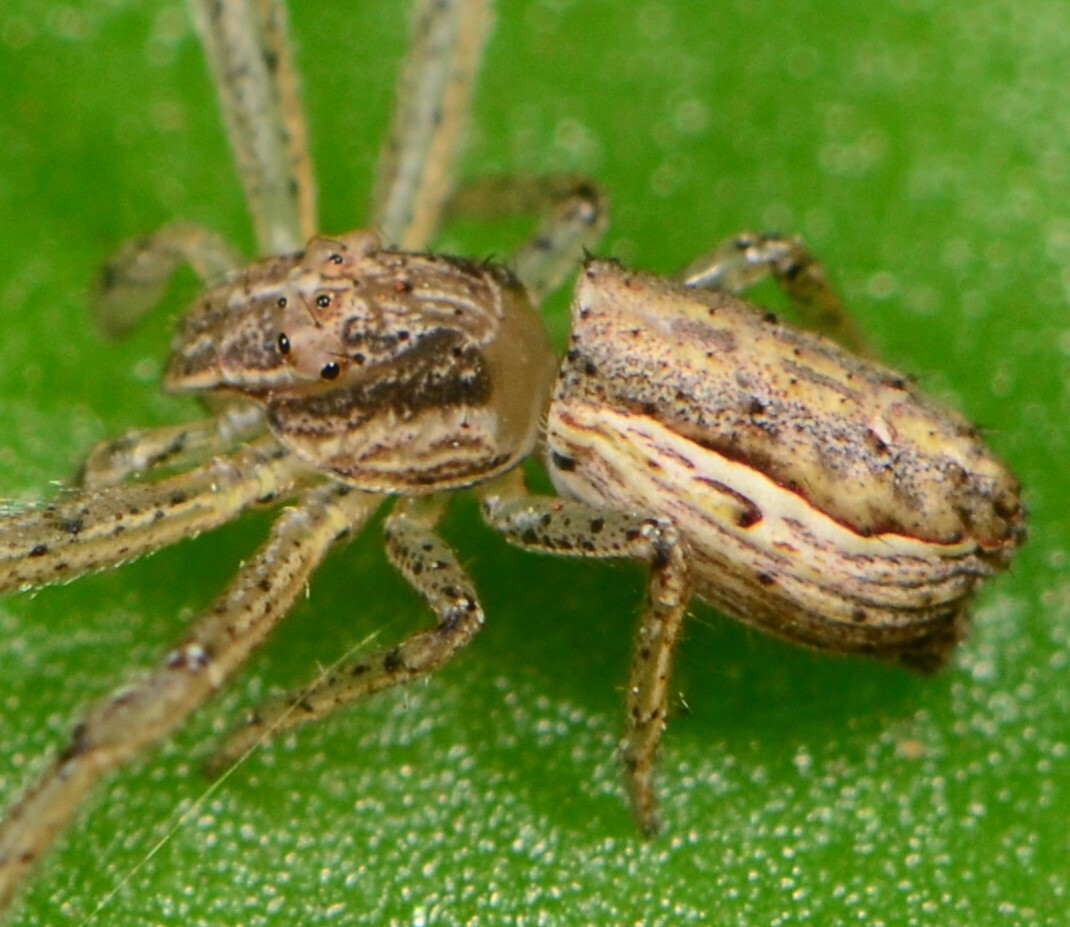
juvenile male

=== Female ===
Females have a total length of 3.7–4.0 mm with a cephalothorax length of 1.3–1.8 mm. The carapace is fawn-colored with black tinting and features two brown submarginal lines, while the chelicerae are fawn-colored. The opisthosoma is pinkish white and ornamentally decorated with a tan folium that is punctuated with brown markings, occupying almost the entire dorsal area.

The carapace is longer than wide with lateral sides that are almost parallel. Both eye rows are recurved, with the median eyes smaller than the lateral eyes. The chelicerae, clypeus, and carapace are equipped with strong spine-like setae. A distinctive feature of the species is the abdominal tubercle, which when viewed in profile shows the abdomen is truncated posteriorly with a blunt projection situated well above the spinnerets. The abdomen is dorsally folium-shaped with angular scallops along the edge, each scallop bearing a small tubercle with a strong seta.

The epigyne is not very distinct, and the spermathecae are sclerotized and visible externally, though difficult to distinguish from the epigynum.

=== Male ===
Males are slightly smaller than females, with a total length of 3.6–3.8 mm and cephalothorax length of 1.4–1.5 mm. Males are morphologically very similar to females in coloration and general appearance. The male pedipalp features a thin embolus and a hook-like tibial apophysis. The tegulum has an apophysis that is more centrally situated and directed retrolaterally, distinguishing it from related species such as T. africanus.

== Taxonomy ==
The species was first described by Roger de Lessert in 1928 from specimens collected in the Democratic Republic of the Congo. According to Lessert's original description, T. foliatus represents a transitional form between the genera Tmarus and Monaeses, as evidenced by similarities in the lengthening of the carapace with lateral sides almost parallel, the shape of the palps, and the distinctive abdominal tubercle.

T. foliatus resembles T. africanus and T. planetarius in having an abdomen that is longer than wide, but differs from them in the shape of the abdomen and the genitalia. The species can be distinguished from other Tmarus species by the characteristic that the posterior median eyes are closer to each other than to the posterior lateral eyes.
