= Superwoman (disambiguation) =

Superwoman is the name of several fictional characters from DC Comics.

Superwoman may also refer to:

== Comics ==
- Superwoman (Kristin Wells), a version of the DC Comics character, introduced in 1981
- Superwoman (Luma Lynai), a minor version of the DC Comics character, introduced in 1962
- Superwoman (Crime Syndicate), a villainous version of the DC Comics character, introduced in 1964.

== Music ==
=== Albums ===
- Superwoman (Paulini album), 2006
- Superwoman (Rebecca Ferguson album), 2016

=== Songs ===
- "Superwoman" (Alicia Keys song), 2008
- "Superwoman" (Karyn White song), 1988
- "Superwoman (Where Were You When I Needed You)", by Stevie Wonder, 1972
- "Superwoman Pt. II", by Lil' Mo, 2001
- "Supawoman", by Kimberley Locke from Based on a True Story, 2007
- "Superwoman", by Meghan Trainor from Takin' It Back, 2022
- "Superwoman", by Mumzy Stranger from Journey Begins, 2010
- "Superwoman", by Shontelle from Shontelligence, 2008

== Other uses ==
- Superwoman (sociology), a woman striving to excel in multiple roles
- IISuperwomanII, Lilly Singh (born 1988), Canadian YouTuber
- Nenu Super Woman (lit. 'I Am A Superwoman'), Indian startup business reality television series
