= ABC model of flower development =

Model for genetics of flower development

ABC model of flower development guided by three groups of homeotic genes.

The ABC model of flower development is a scientific model of the process by which flowering plants produce a pattern of gene expression in meristems that leads to the appearance of an organ oriented towards sexual reproduction, a flower. There are three physiological developments that must occur in order for this to take place: firstly, the plant must pass from sexual immaturity into a sexually mature state (i.e. a transition towards flowering); secondly, the transformation of the apical meristem's function from a vegetative meristem into a floral meristem or inflorescence; and finally the growth of the flower's individual organs. The latter phase has been modelled using the ABC model, which aims to describe the biological basis of the process from the perspective of molecular and developmental genetics.

An external stimulus is required in order to trigger the differentiation of the meristem into a flower meristem. This stimulus will activate mitotic cell division in the apical meristem, particularly on its sides where new primordia are formed. This same stimulus will also cause the meristem to follow a developmental pattern that will lead to the growth of floral meristems as opposed to vegetative meristems. The main difference between these two types of meristem, apart from the obvious disparity between the objective organ, is the verticillate (or whorled) phyllotaxis, that is, the absence of stem elongation among the successive whorls or verticils of the primordium. These verticils follow an acropetal development, giving rise to sepals, petals, stamens and carpels. Another difference from vegetative axillary meristems is that the floral meristem is "determined", which means that, once differentiated, its cells will no longer divide.

The identity of the organs present in the four floral verticils is a consequence of the interaction of at least three types of gene products, each with distinct functions. According to the ABC model, functions A and C are required in order to determine the identity of the verticils of the perianth and the reproductive verticils, respectively. These functions are exclusive and the absence of one of them means that the other will determine the identity of all the floral verticils. The B function allows the differentiation of petals from sepals in the secondary verticil, as well as the differentiation of the stamen from the carpel on the tertiary verticil.

Goethe's foliar theory was formulated in the 18th century and it suggests that the constituent parts of a flower are structurally modified leaves, which are functionally specialized for reproduction or protection. The theory was first published in 1790 in the essay "Metamorphosis of Plants" ("Versuch die Metamorphose der Pflanzen zu erklären"). where Goethe wrote:

"...we may equally well say that a stamen is a contracted petal, as that a petal is a stamen in a state of expansion; or that a sepal is a contracted stem leaf approaching a certain stage of refinement, as that a stem leaf is a sepal expanded by the influx of cruder saps".

== Floral transition ==
The transition from the vegetative phase to a reproductive phase involves a dramatic change in the plant's vital cycle, perhaps the most important one, as the process must be carried out correctly in order to guarantee that the plant produces descendants. This transition is characterised by the induction and development of the meristem of the inflorescence, which will produce a collection of flowers or one flower. This morphogenetic change contains both endogenous and exogenous elements: For example, in order for the change to be initiated the plant must have a certain number of leaves and contain a certain level of total biomass. Certain environmental conditions are also required such as a characteristic photoperiod. Plant hormones play an important part in the process, with the gibberellins having a particularly important role.

There are many signals that regulate the molecular biology of the process. The following three genes in Arabidopsis thaliana possess both common and independent functions in floral transition: FLOWERING LOCUS T (FT), LEAFY (LFY), SUPPRESSOR OF OVEREXPRESSION OF CONSTANS1 (SOC1, also called AGAMOUS-LIKE20). SOC1 is a MADS-box-type gene, which integrates responses to photoperiod, vernalization and gibberellins.

== Formation of the floral meristem or the inflorescence ==
The meristem can be defined as the tissue or group of plant tissues that contain undifferentiated stem cells, which are capable of producing any type of cell tissue. Their maintenance and development, both in the vegetative meristem or the meristem of the inflorescence is controlled by genetic cell fate determination mechanisms. This means that a number of genes will directly regulate, for example, the maintenance of the stem cell's characteristics (gene WUSCHEL or WUS), and others will act via negative feedback mechanisms in order to inhibit a characteristic (gene CLAVATA or CLV). In this way both mechanisms give rise to a feedback loop, which along with other elements lend a great deal of robustness to the system. Along with the WUS gene the SHOOTMERISTEMLESS (STM) gene also represses the differentiation of the meristematic dome. This gene acts by inhibiting the possible differentiation of the stem cells but still allows cell division in the daughter cells, which, had they been allowed to differentiate, would have given rise to distinct organs.

== Floral architecture ==
Anatomy of a flower

A flower's anatomy, as defined by the presence of a series of organs (sepals, petals, stamens and carpels) positioned according to a given pattern, facilitate sexual reproduction in flowering plants. The flower arises from the activity of three classes of genes, which regulate floral development:

- Meristem identity genes, which code for the transcription factors required to initiate the induction of the identity genes. They are positive regulators of organ identity during floral development.
- Organ identity genes, which directly control organ identity and also code for transcription factors that control the expression of other genes, whose products are implicated in the formation or function of the distinct organs of the flower.
- Cadastral genes, which act as spatial regulators for the organ identity genes by defining boundaries for their expression. In this way they control the extent to which genes interact thereby regulating whether they act in the same place at the same time.

=== The ABC model ===
The ABC model of flower development was first formulated by George Haughn and Chris Somerville in 1988. It was first used as a model to describe the collection of genetic mechanisms that establish floral organ identity in the Rosids, as exemplified by Arabidopsis thaliana, and the Asterids, as demonstrated by Antirrhinum majus. Both species have four verticils (sepals, petals, stamens and carpels), which are defined by the differential expression of a number of homeotic genes present in each verticil. This means that the sepals are solely characterized by the expression of A genes, while the petals are characterized by the co-expression of A and B genes. The B and C genes establish the identity of the stamens and the carpels only require C genes to be active. Type A and C genes are reciprocally antagonistic.

The fact that these homeotic genes determine an organ's identity becomes evident when a gene that represents a particular function, for example the A gene, is not expressed. In Arabidopsis this loss results in a flower which is composed of one verticil of carpels, another containing stamens and another of carpels. This method for studying gene function uses reverse genetics techniques to produce transgenic plants that contain a mechanism for gene silencing through RNA interference. In other studies, using forward genetics techniques such as genetic mapping, it is the analysis of the phenotypes of flowers with structural anomalies that leads to the cloning of the gene of interest. The flowers may possess a non-functional or over expressed allele for the gene being studied.

The existence of two supplementary functions, D and E, have also been proposed in addition to the A, B and C functions already discussed. Function D specifies the identity of the ovule, as a separate reproductive function from the development of the carpels, which occurs after their determination. Function E relates to a physiological requirement that is a characteristic of all floral verticils, although, it was initially described as necessary for the development of the three innermost verticils (Function E sensu stricto). However, its broader definition (sensu lato) suggests that it is required in the four verticils. Therefore, when Function D is lost the structure of the ovules becomes similar to that of leaves and when Function E is lost sensu stricto, the floral organs of the three outer most verticils are transformed into sepals, while on losing Function E sensu lato, all the verticils are similar to leaves. The gene products of genes with D and E functions are also MADS-box genes.

=== Genetic analysis ===
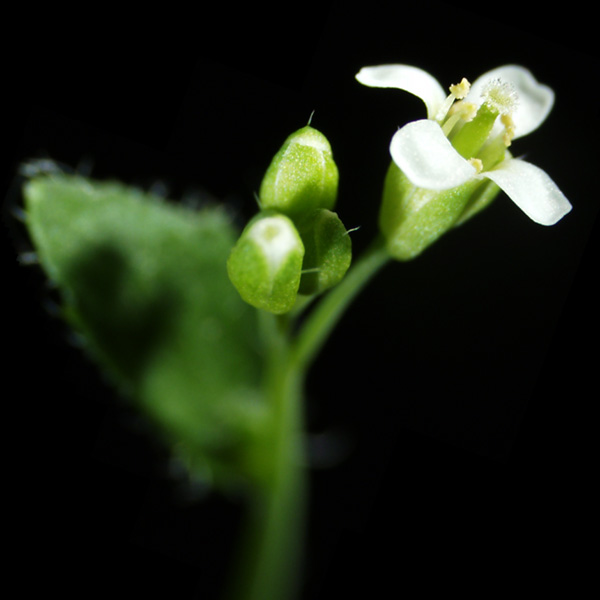
Flower of A. thaliana.

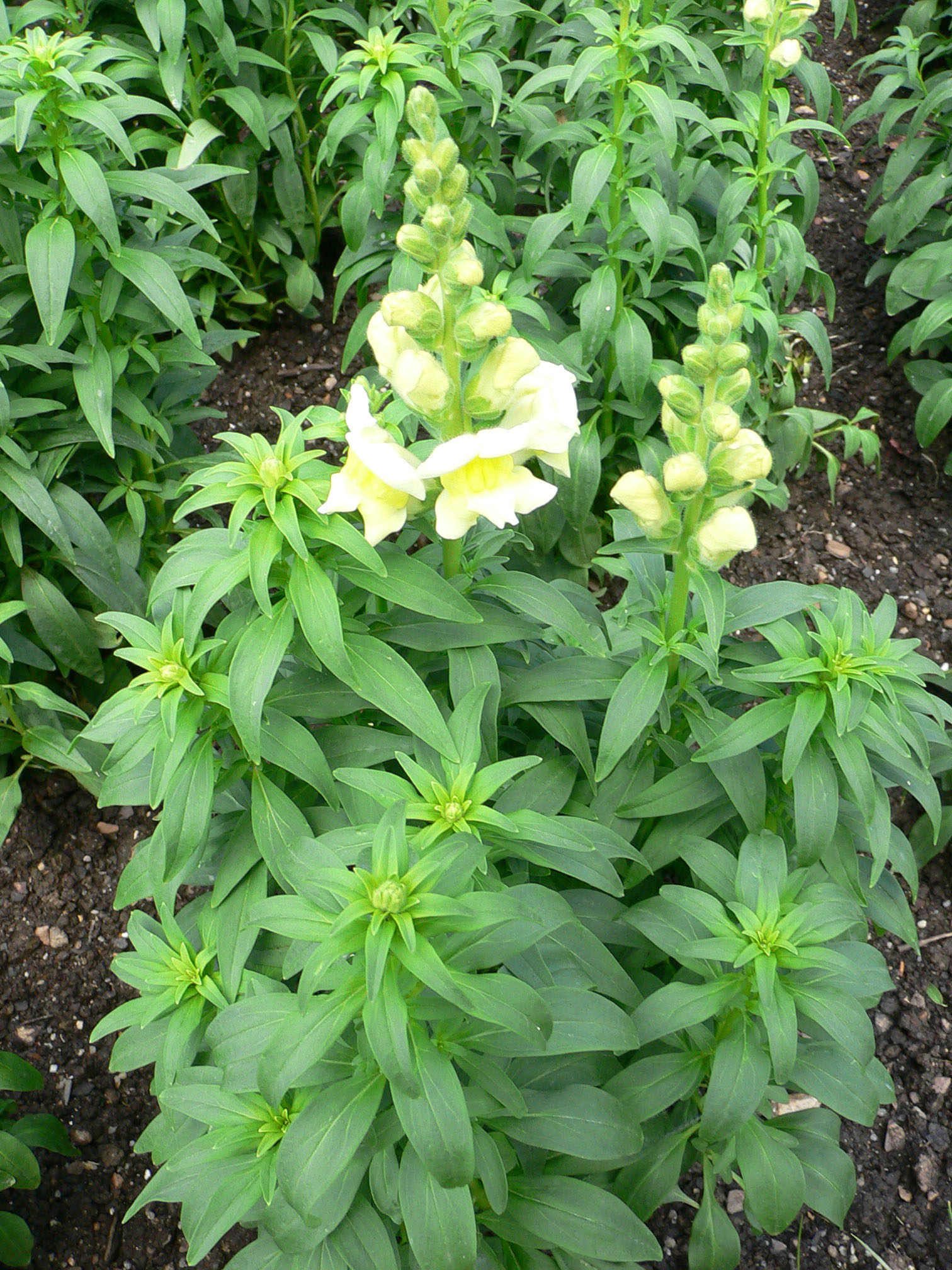
Flowers of A. majus.

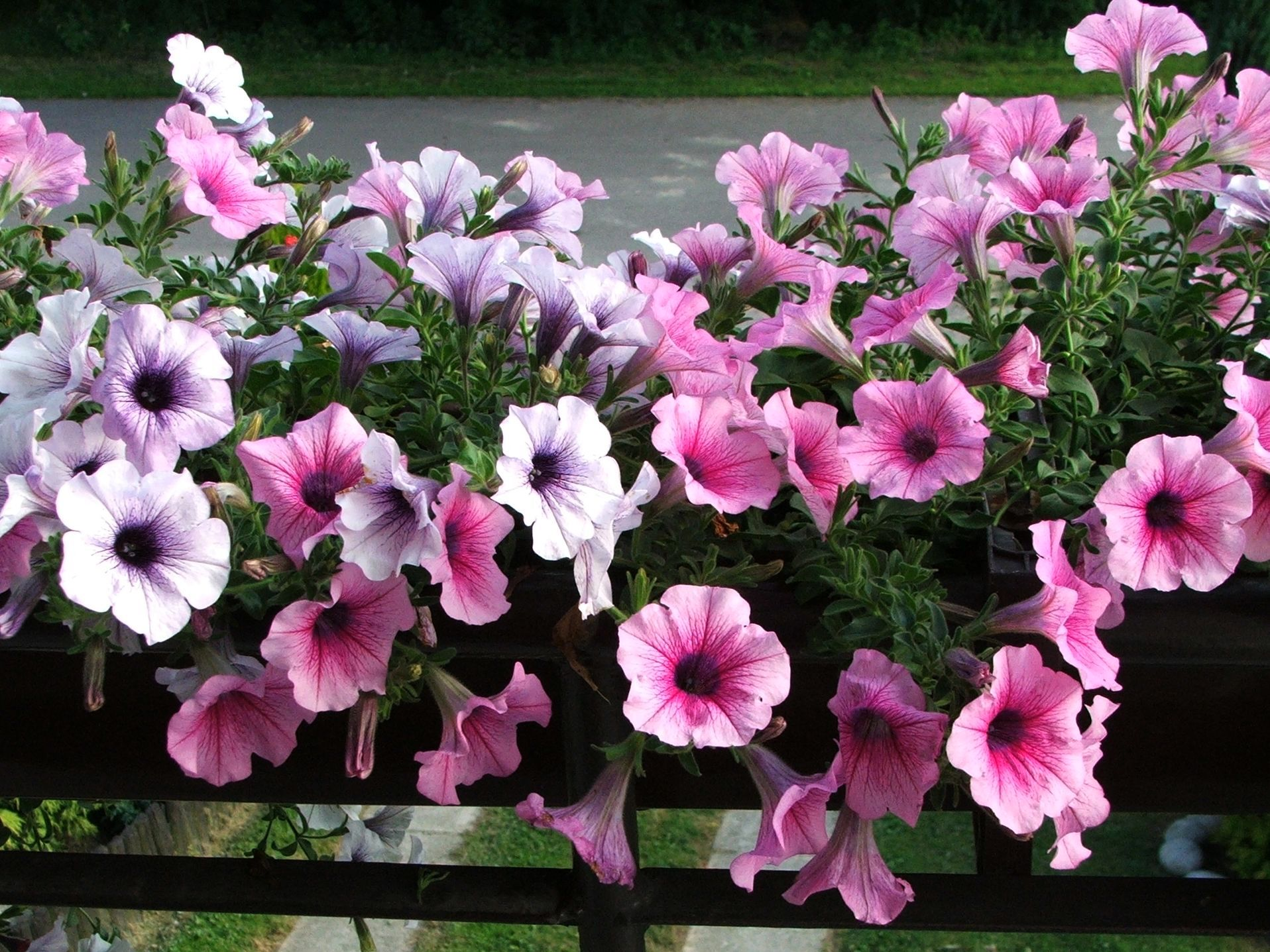
Flowers of Petunia hybrid.

The methodology for studying flower development involves two steps. Firstly, the identification of the exact genes required for determining the identity of the floral meristem. In A. thaliana these include APETALA1 (AP1) and LEAFY (LFY). Secondly, genetic analysis is carried out on the aberrant phenotypes for the relative characteristics of the flowers, which allows the characterization of the homeotic genes implicated in the process.

==== Analysis of mutants ====
There are a great many mutations that affect floral morphology, although the analysis of these mutants is a recent development. Supporting evidence for the existence of these mutations comes from the fact that a large number affect the identity of floral organs. For example, some organs develop in a location where others should develop. This is called homeotic mutation, which is analogous to HOX gene mutations found in Drosophila. In Arabidopsis and Antirrhinum, the two taxa on which models are based, these mutations always affect adjacent verticils.

This allows the characterization of three classes of mutation, according to which whorls are affected:

- Mutations in type A genes – These mutations affect the development of the calyx (sepals) and corolla (petals), which are the outermost whorls. In these mutants, such as APETALA2 in A. thaliana, carpels develop instead of sepals and stamen in place of petals. This means that, the whorls of the perianth are transformed into reproductive whorls. APETALA1 is also classified as a type A gene. APETALA1 mutants do not undergo floral meristem induction correctly, and can form branched inflorescences in the place of a single flower. Mutants also show development of bract-like structures in the first whorl and an absent second whorl.
- Mutations in type B genes – These mutations affect the corolla and the stamens, which are the intermediate whorls. Two mutations have been found in A. thaliana, APETALA3 and PISTILLATA, both of which cause development of sepals instead of petals and carpels in the place of stamen.
- Mutations in type C genes – These mutations affect the reproductive whorls: the stamen and the carpels. The A. thaliana mutant of this type is called AGAMOUS, it possesses a phenotype containing repeating whorls of petals instead of stamens and sepals instead of carpels.
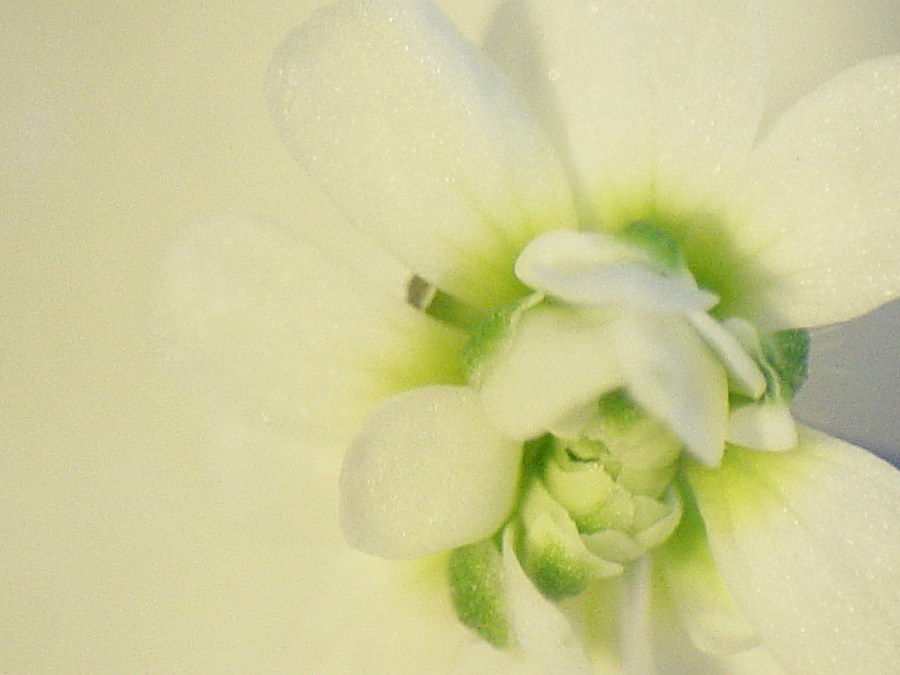
AGAMOUS mutation resulting in a double-flowered Arabidopsis

==== Techniques for detecting differential expression ====
Cloning studies have been carried out on DNA in the genes associated with the affected homeotic functions in the mutants discussed above. These studies used serial analysis of gene expression throughout floral development to show patterns of tissue expression, which, in general, correspond with the predictions of the ABC model.

The nature of these genes corresponds to that of transcription factors, which, as expected, have analogous structures to a group of factors contained in yeasts and animal cells. This group is called MADS, which is an acronym for the different factors contained in the group. These MADS factors have been detected in all the vegetable species studied, although the involvement of other elements involved in the regulation of gene expression cannot be discounted.

=== Genes exhibiting type-A function ===
In A. thaliana, function A is mainly represented by two genes APETALA1 (AP1) and APETALA2 (AP2) AP1 is a MADS-box type gene, while AP2 belongs to the family of genes that contains AP2, which it gives its name to and which consists of transcription factors that are only found in plants. AP2 has also been shown to complex with the co-repressor TOPLESS (TPL) in developing floral buds to repress the C-class gene AGAMOUS (AG). However, AP2 is not expressed in the shoot apical meristem (SAM), which contains the latent stem cell population throughout the adult life of Arabidopsis, and so it is speculated that TPL works with some other A-class gene in the SAM to repress AG.AP1 functions as a type A gene, both in controlling the identity of sepals and petals, and it also acts in the floral meristem. AP2 not only functions in the first two verticils, but also in the remaining two, in developing ovules and even in leaves. It is also likely that post-transcriptional regulation exists, which controls its A function, or even that it has other purposes in the determination of organ identity independent of that mentioned here.

In Antirrhinum, the orthologous gene to AP1 is SQUAMOSA (SQUA), which also has a particular impact on the floral meristem. The homologs for AP2 are LIPLESS1 (LIP1) and LIPLESS2 (LIP2), which have a redundant function and are of special interest in the development of sepals, petals and ovules.

A total of three genes have been isolated from Petunia hybrida that are similar to AP2: P. hybrida APETALA2A (PhAP2A), PhAP2B and PhAP2C. PhAP2A is, to a large degree, homologous with the AP2 gene of Arabidopsis, both in its sequence and in its expression pattern, which suggests that the two genes are orthologs. The proteins PhAP2B and PhAP2C, on the other hand, are slightly different, even though they belong to the family of transcription factors that are similar to AP2. In addition they are expressed in different ways, although they are very similar in comparison with PhAP2A. In fact, the mutants for these genes do not show the usual phenotype, that of the null alleles of A genes. A true A-function gene has not been found in Petunia; though a part of the A-function (the inhibition of the C in the outer two whorls) has been largely attributed to miRNA169 (colloquially called BLIND)

=== Genes exhibiting type-B function ===
In A. thaliana the type-B function mainly arises from two genes, APETALA3 (AP3) and PISTILLATA (PI), both of which are MADS-box genes. A mutation of either of these genes causes the homeotic conversion of petals into sepals and of stamens into carpels. This also occurs in its orthologs in A. majus, which are DEFICIENS (DEF) and GLOBOSA (GLO) respectively. For both species the active form of binding with DNA is that derived from the heterodimer: AP3 and PI, or DEF and GLO, dimerize. This is the form in which they are able to function.

The GLO/PI lines that have been duplicated in Petunia contain P. hybrida GLOBOSA1 (PhGLO1, also called FBP1) and also PhGLO2 (also called PMADS2 or FBP3). For the functional elements equivalent to AP3/DEF in Petunia there is both a gene that possesses a relatively similar sequence, called PhDEF and there is also an atypical B function gene called PhTM6. Phylogenetic studies have placed the first three within the «euAP3» lineage, while PhTM6 belongs to that of «paleoAP3». It is worth pointing out that, in terms of evolutionary history, the appearance of the euAP3 line seems to be related with the emergence of dicotyledons, as representatives of euAP3-type B function genes are present in dicotyledons while paleoAP3 genes are present in monocotyledons and basal angiosperms, among others.

As discussed above, the floral organs of eudicotyledonous angiosperms are arranged in 4 different verticils, containing the sepals, petals, stamen and carpels. The ABC model states that the identity of these organs is determined by the homeotic genes A, A+B, B+C and C, respectively. In contrast with the sepal and petal verticils of the eudicots, the perigone of many plants of the family Liliaceae have two nearly identical external petaloid verticils (the tepals). In order to explain the floral morphology of the Liliaceae, van Tunen et al. proposed a modified ABC model in 1993. This model suggests that class B genes are not only expressed in verticils 2 and 3, but also in 1. It therefore follows that the organs of verticils 1 and 2 express class A and B genes and this is how they have a petaloid structure. This theoretical model has been experimentally proven through the cloning and characterization of homologs of the Antirrhinum genes GLOBOSA and DEFICIENS in a Liliaceae, the tulip Tulipa gesneriana. These genes are expressed in verticils 1,2 and 3. The homologs GLOBOSA and DEFICIENS have also been isolated and characterized in Agapanthus praecox ssp. orientalis (Agapanthaceae), which is phylogenetically distant from the model organisms. In this study the genes were called ApGLO and ApDEF, respectively. Both contain open reading frames that code for proteins with 210 to 214 amino acids. Phylogenetic analysis of these sequences indicated that they belong to B gene family of the monocotyledons. In situ hybridization studies revealed that both sequences are expressed in verticil 1 as well as in 2 and 3. When taken together, these observations show that the floral development mechanism of Agapanthus also follows the modified ABC model.

=== Genes exhibiting type-C function ===
In A. thaliana, the C function is derived from one MADS-box type gene called AGAMOUS (AG), which intervenes both in the establishment of stamen and carpel identity as well as in the determination of the floral meristem. Therefore, the AG mutants are devoid of androecium and gynoecium and they have petals and sepals in their place. In addition, the growth in the centre of the flower is undifferentiated, therefore the petals and sepals grow in repetitive verticils.

The PLENA (PLE) gene is present in A. majus, in place of the AG gene, although it is not an ortholog. However, the FARINELLI (FAR) gene is an ortholog, which is specific to the development of the anthers and the maturation of pollen.

In Petunia, Antirrhinum and in maize the C function is controlled by a number of genes that act in the same manner. The genes that are closer homologs of AG in Petunia are pMADS3 and floral-binding protein 6 (FBP6).

=== Genes exhibiting type-D and E functions ===
The D function genes were discovered in 1995. These genes are MADS-box proteins and they have a function that is distinct from those previously described, although they have a certain homology with C function genes. These genes are called FLORAL BINDING PROTEIN7 (FBP7) and FLORAL BINDING PROTEIN1L (FBP1l). It was found that, in Petunia, they are involved in the development of the ovule. Equivalent genes were later found in Arabidopsis, where they are also involved in controlling the development of carpels and the ovule and even with structures related to seed dispersal.

The appearance of interesting phenotypes in RNA interference studies in Petunia and tomato led, in 1994, to the definition of a new type of function in the floral development model. The E function was initially thought to be only involved in the development of the three innermost verticils, however, subsequent work found that its expression was required in all the floral verticils.

== See also ==
- Flower
- MADS-box
- Mutation
- Plant evolutionary developmental biology
- Superman (gene)

== Sources ==
=== General texts ===
- Soltis, DE; Soltis, PS; Leebens-Mack, J, eds. (2006). Advances in botanical research: Developmental genetics of the flower. New York, NY: Academic Press. ISBN 978-0-12-005944-7.
- Wolpert, Lewis; Beddington, R.; Jessell, T.; Lawrence, P.; Meyerowitz, E.; Smith, W. (2002). Principles of Development (Second ed.). Oxford: Oxford University Press. ISBN 978-0-19-879291-8.
