= Superman (Pepe Luis Soto song) =

1977 disco novelty song

Single by Celi Bee and the Buzzy Bunch

from the album Celi Bee and the Buzzy Bunch
- B-side: "Hurt Me, Hurt Me"
- Released: 1977
- Genre: Disco
- Length: 3:35 (single version); 5:09 (album & 12" version)
- Label: APA/TK
- Songwriter(s): Pepe Luis Soto
- Producer(s): Pepe Luis Soto; Tato Rossi

Celi Bee and the Buzzy Bunch singles chronology
"One Love" (1977)	"Superman" (1977)	"Macho (A Real, Real, One)" (1978)

"Superman" is a 1977 disco novelty song written by Puerto Rican producer/songwriter José "Pepe" Luis Soto. Celi Bee and the Buzzy Bunch originally recorded the song for their 1977 album of the same title.

The song narrowly missed the Top 40 on the Billboard Hot 100, peaking at No. 41. However, it was a Top 5 Disco hit, peaking at No. 3 on the Billboard Disco Action charts, along with the track "One Love".

== Background ==
Pepe Luis Soto wrote this song in 1977, during the shooting of Richard Donner's film of the same name, released in December 1978. However, Soto wanted his song to be a kind of parody of the well-known comic book superhero to take advantage of his growing popularity.

In fact, it is a sexualized and explicit novelty song, which describes the intimate and personal feelings of a girl who relates to Superman. The lyrics includes lines as "You get so deep inside and wow".

== Herbie Mann version ==
In 1978, Herbie Mann covered the song for his 1978 album Super Mann. It coincided with the release of the film of the same name. Mann's version has a disco-jazz style and is noticeably faster than the original. The song features extensive use of flute played by himself.

Mann's cover is a Top 40 hit on the Billboard Hot 100, peaking at No. 26.

== Chart performance ==
Celi Bee and the Buzzy Bunch

Chart (1977)	Peak position
US Billboard Hot 100	41
US Billboard Disco Action	3
US Billboard Hot Soul Singles	86
Australia (Kent Music Report)	92

Herbie Mann

Chart (1979)	Peak position
US Billboard Hot 100	26
US Billboard Hot Adult Contemporary Tracks	46
US Billboard Hot Soul Singles	63
