= Klark Kent (graffiti artist) =

German graffiti artist and music producer

Klark Kent SUK TNB DBL GBF SKS GP
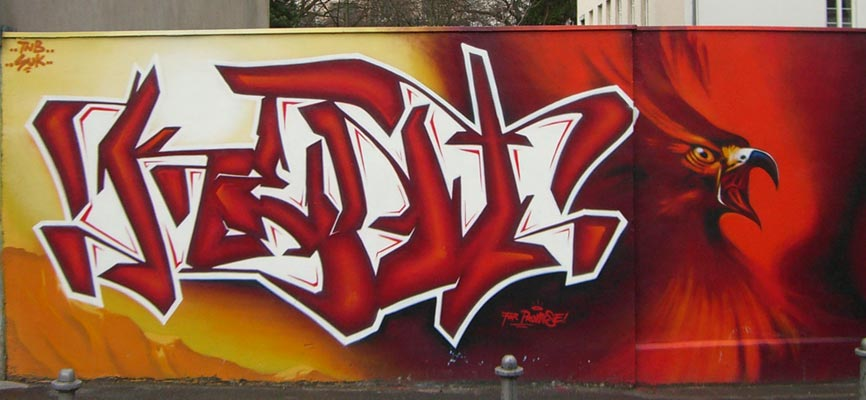
- A Kent graffiti piece in Frankfurt am Main, 2006
- Born: 1973 (age 52–53); Frankfurt am Main, West Germany
- Movement: Graffiti
- Elected: Montana Writer Team
- Patrons: Montana Cans
- Website: Klark Kent on Instagram

Klark Kent (born 1973 in Frankfurt am Main, West Germany) is a graffiti artist and music producer.

Klark Kent has been writing graffiti since 1989, and has gained international credit for his work over the years. Besides books and magazines his art was shown on several exhibitions worldwide, including the Galleries Vincent Louis (1998) and Pacifico Fine Art (1999) in New York. Some of his pieces were used in the 2006 video game "Getting Up: Contents Under Pressure" by Marc Ecko. He is a member of the Montana Writer Team, a group sponsored by spray paint manufacturer Montana Cans. Together with his teammates and friends Atom, Can2 and Smash137 he realised many Projects around the world including city trips and exhibitions. In 2007 they painted a huge wall in Dubai.

Klark Kent has developed the Online Graffiti Game "Bomb the World" where users can virtually paint trains at 20 locations worldwide. The Game has won the "People's Choice Award" at the Flash Film Festival NYC in 2004. Klark Kent is currently working on a new version.

As a musician he created the theme song for "Bomb the World" as well as the Instrumental for a song competition held among users of the game. His productions have appeared on many mixtapes, mostly by local German rap artists.
