= Clark-Kent =

American bicycle frame manufacturer

Clark-Kent was a bicycle frame manufacturer based in Denver, Colorado. The name Clark-Kent was a hybrid of the names of the company owners, Pat Clark and Dean Kent, and had no connection with the alter ego of Superman beyond name recognition. Nor is it related in any way with Kent Bicycles of Parsippany, New Jersey.

== History ==
Clark-Kent started building bicycle frames in 1989. The company built both road and mountain bike frames in steel and titanium and were the early builders of Greg LeMond road and mountain titanium frames, before LeMond production went to Litespeed and later Trek Bicycle Corporation. Clark-Kent sponsored the Coors-Light domestic professional cycling team which included well known road racer and olympic gold medalist Alexi Grewal, and also sponsored Colorado based elite junior cycling squad Horsetooth Racing Team in 1993, which included US Junior National Team members. The company employed master-welders Ivo Vinklarek and Don Herr, however welding on later frames was outsourced with some quality problems which contributed to the demise of the brand. Pat Clark was part owner of the famous Denver Spoke bicycle shop, and also owned a group of bicycle shops known as Premier Cycles across the greater Denver area. The company went defunct in the mid-1990s and production was halted.

== Models ==
Clark-Kent Europa Ti Road Frame

Road:

- Europa Ti
- Ti-300
- Ti-500
- AX-1

Mountain:

- F-12
- F-14
- F-16
