= Suparman =

Indonesian state justice minister (1913–1948)

Mr. Raden Suparman
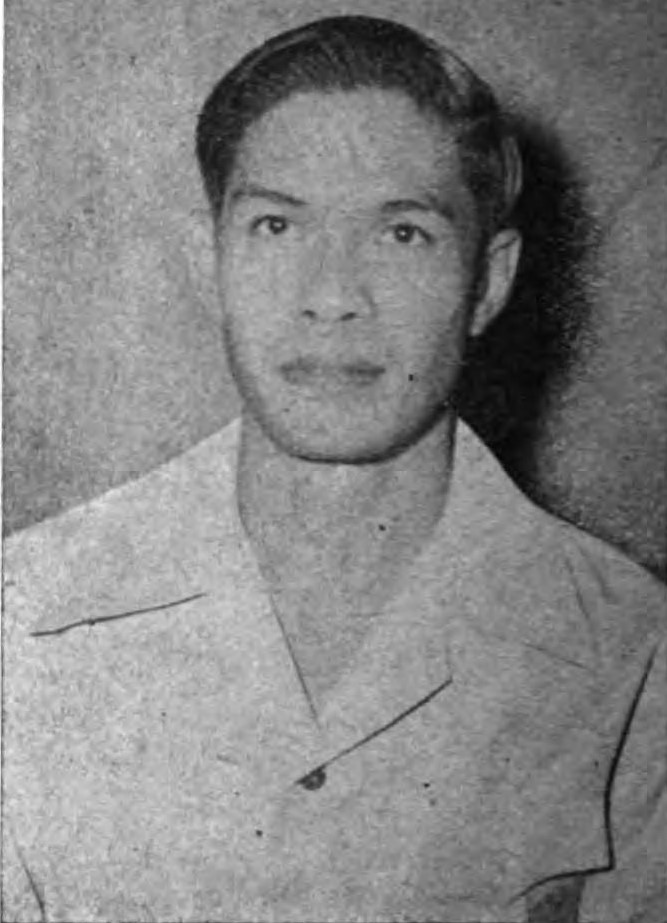

Minister of Justice of Pasundan
- In office 8 May 1948 – 14 October 1948
- Preceded by: office created
- Succeeded by: Tan Hwat Tiang

Personal details
- Born: 6 March 1913 Sagalaherang, Purwakarta, Dutch East Indies
- Died: 14 October 1948 (aged 35) Cirebon, Pasundan

Suparman (6 March 1913 – 14 October 1948) was the first minister of justice of the State of Pasundan.

Suparman was born in 1913 at Sagalaherang, Purwakarta. In 1937, he graduated from the Rechtshoogeschool te Batavia (now the Faculty of Law of the University of Indonesia) and earned the Master of Laws degree (meester in de rechten). After he graduated, he became an advocate and procurator in Cirebon until his appointment as the Minister of Justice.

During the Japanese occupation, Suparman took office as a notary and as a social affairs officer. After the independence of Indonesia, he became the Head of Office for Social Affairs in Cirebon. After the first Dutch military aggression, he became a social affairs officer again. He was appointed as the Minister of Justice by Prime Minister Adil Puradiredja on 8 May 1948.

He died in a car crash during his working trip to Cirebon on 14 October 1948. His position was replaced by Tan Hwat Tiang four days later.

== Bibliography ==
- Government of Pasundan (1949), Satu Tahun Berdirinja Negara Pasundan, Bandung
