= Superman Returns (disambiguation) =

Superman Returns is a 2006 film directed by Bryan Singer.

Superman Returns may also refer to:

- Superman Returns (novel), a novelization of the film written by Marv Wolfman
- Superman Returns (soundtrack), a soundtrack album for the 2006 film
- Superman Returns (video game), a video game based on the film
- Superman Returns: Fortress of Solitude, a video game for the Game Boy Advance; see Superman Returns (video game) § Related games

== See also ==
- The Return of Superman (disambiguation)
