= LEAFY =

Plant gene

LEAFY (abbreviated LFY) is a homeotic plant transcription factor that plays a key role in specifying that the undifferentiated cells present in an indeterminate inflorescence meristem develop into a floral meristem and eventually flowers.

LEAFY encodes a plant-specific transcription factor, is found in all land plants and in charophytes and one of its exons have been used extensively in phylogenetic work on spermatophytes.

In Arabidopsis thaliana, LEAFY acts as a master regulator of floral development. Transcription of LEAFY is suppressed in vegetative tissues by TERMINAL FLOWER 1 (TFL1) and activated by FLOWERING LOCUS T (FT); both TFL1 and FT act through the bZip transcription factor FD. When LEAFY is sufficiently expressed (due to greater FT binding to FD than TFL1), floral fate is then determined. The LEAFY protein then activates transcription of another homeotic transcription factor, APETALA1, first by binding to the APETALA1 locus and then by making the surrounding chromatin accessible through chromatin remodeling and displacing H1 linker histones. APETALA1 functions as a A-class gene in the ABC model of flower development and specifies sepal and petal floral organ development, furthering the transition of the meristem into floral identity.

LEAFY loss-of-function mutants in A. thaliana typically possess leafy, vegetative shoots where flowers would normally develop. These mutants are generally sterile due to the lack of flower development, although they can occasionally develop pistils, especially when mutants are grown in colder temperatures. When LEAFY is overexpressed, plants are less sensitive to environmental signals and flower earlier.

The LEAFY protein has two conserved domains: the DNA binding domain, a helix-turn-helix motif buried inside a unique 7-helix fold and a Sterile Alpha Motif. It binds DNA as a dimer and its binding site has been identified both in vivo and in vitro. The F-box protein Unusual Floral Organs (UFO) is able to redirect LFY to binding sites that LFY cannot access alone and, together, they regulate genes involved in petal and stamen development (such as APETALA3, PISTILLATA or RABBIT EARS).
