= Wali Negara of Pasundan =

Defunct political office

Wali Negara of Pasundan Wali Negara Pasundan
- Coat of arms

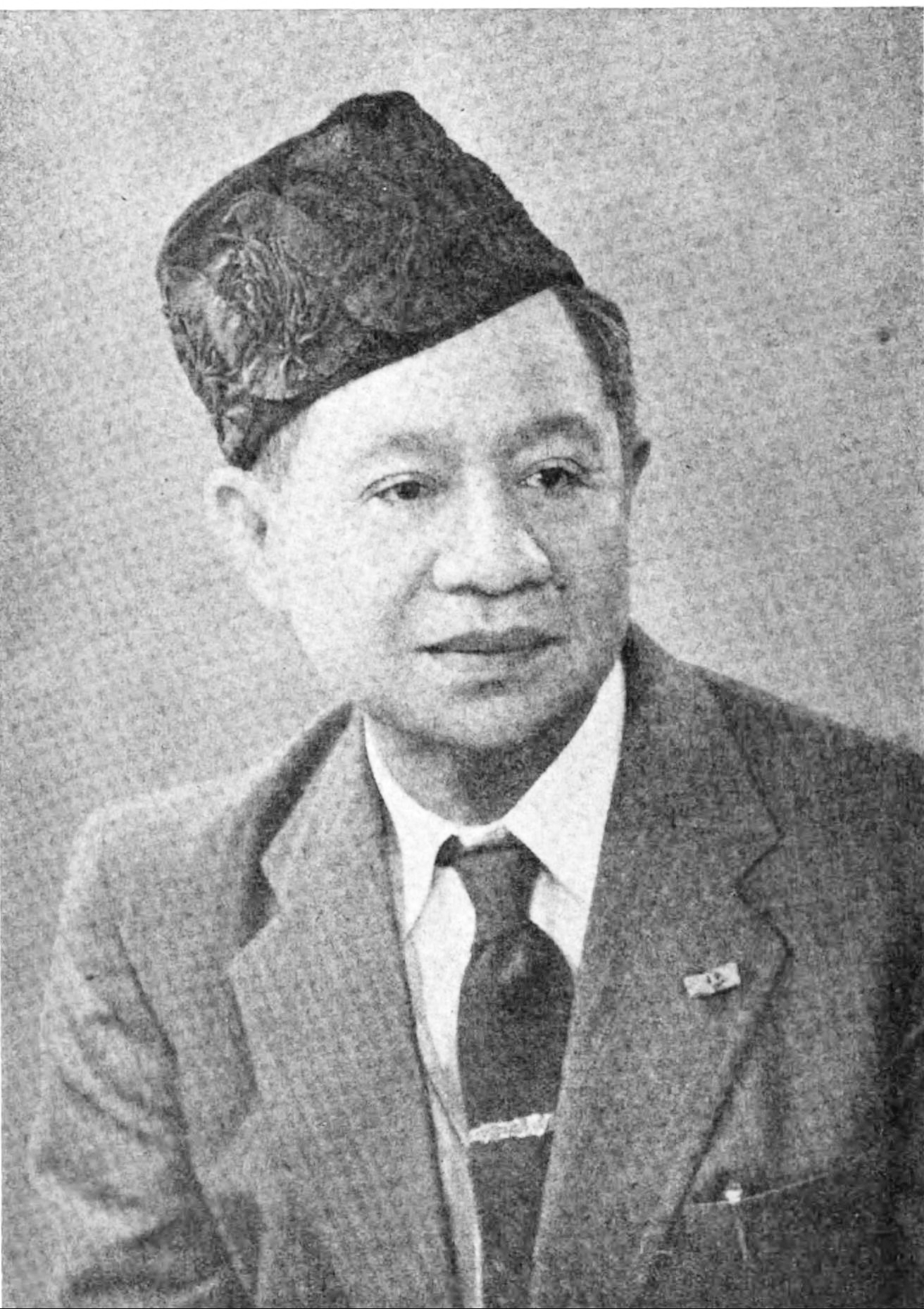
- Only officeholder Wiranatakusumah V 24 April 1948 – 10 February 1950
- Style: Paduka Yang Mulia
- Reports to: Parliament of Pasundan
- Residence: Pakuan Building
- Seat: Bandung
- Appointer: Direct popular election
- Term length: 4 years
- Constituting instrument: Constitution of Pasundan
- Inaugural holder: Wiranatakusumah V
- Formation: 24 April 1948
- Abolished: 10 February 1950
- Succession: Governor of West Java
- Deputy: Speaker of Parliament

The Wali Negara of Pasundan (Indonesian: Wali Negara Pasundan, lit. 'State Guardian of Pasundan') was the head of state and highest political office in the short-lived State of Pasundan, which existed as a Dutch-backed federal parliamentary republic from 1948 until the state's dissolution in 1950. According to the Regulations of the Constitutional Organization of Pasundan, the Wali Negara had the authority to dissolve the Parliament, appoint and discharge the Prime Minister, enact decrees, and submit law drafts and the state budget to the Parliament. If the Wali Negara died or resigned prior to the end of the term, the Speaker of the Parliament, who also acted as the Deputy Wali Negara, would have replaced him/her.

== History ==
=== Election ===
The first election to the position of Wali Negara was held on 4 March 1948, during the Third West Java Conference. There were two candidates competing in this election, nominated by different factions of delegates. Wiranatakusumah V, former Chairman of the Supreme Advisory Council, was nominated by the unitary faction, while Hilman Djajadiningrat, former Regent of Sukabumi, was nominated by the federalist faction. Wiranatakusumah won the election by 46 to 54 votes. The Speaker of the Parliament, Djuarsa, broadcast the results of the election to the territory of the Republic of Indonesia, and stated that Wiranatakusumah had a week to accept his election.

Even though the Republic of Indonesia government considered the election undemocratic, Wiranatakusumah was given permission by the Indonesian government to accept his election. Thus, the government of Pasundan sent a group of three, consisting of Soejoso, Adil Puradiredja, and Thung Jie Leh, to Jogjakarta and escorted Wiranatakusumah to the State of Pasundan.

Although initially Wiranatakusumah was opposed to the formation of the State of Pasundan, he and the Indonesia government accepted it, considering that it was better for the position to fall tosomeone pro-Indonesian rather than falling to a pro-Dutch individual such as Hilman. Masjkur, the Minister of Religious Affairs of Indonesia, stated that the "victory of Wiranatakusumah in the State of Pasundan is also the victory of the Republic of Indonesia". He was relieved of his position as the Chairman of the Supreme Advisory Council of Indonesia, to be replaced by Ario Soerjo.

=== Arrival ===
On 19 March 1948, Wiranatakusumah landed the Andir Airfield (now Husein Sastranegara International Airport) in Bandung. He was greeted by the populace of the State of Pasundan. Unexpectedly, a rousing welcome accompanied by a cry of Merdeka (the Indonesian word for 'freedom') prompted the Dutch to arrest several teachers and students who were thought to be responsible for these cries.

=== Inauguration ===
The inauguration of Wiranatakusumah went ahead on 24 April 1948. It was attended by the Lieutenant Governor General of the Dutch East Indies, Hubertus van Mook, the General Secretary of the Provisional Federal Government, Abdulkadir Widjojoatmodjo, and the Recomba (government commissioner for administrative affairs) of West Java, Hilman Djajadiningrat.

== Resignation ==
After the formation of the United States of Indonesia, there were growing demands by the Pasundan populace to dissolve the state. On 10 February 1950, at the Pakuan building, the residence of the Wali Negara, Wiranatakusumah, represented by his deputy, Djuarsa, handed over his power as the Wali Negara of Pasundan to the Commissary of the United States of Indonesia for West Java, Sewaka.

== Selection process ==
=== Eligibility ===
In order to be able to run for office, a candidate must be an Indonesian citizen by birth that is over thirty years old. The candidate must also reside within the state for five years. The provisions are set down in Article 30 of the Regulations of the Constitutional Organization of Pasundan.

=== Election ===
Elections for Wali Negara were to occur every four years by a national vote. The previous Wali Negara would be eligible for reelection. The Wali Negara would resign after his or her successor took office.

== Powers and duties ==
Article 34 to 39, Article 42, 49, 51, 52, 54, 55, 62, 80, and 81 regulated the powers and duties of Wali Negara. According to the Regulations of the Constitutional Organization of Pasundan, the Wali Negara had the duty of representing the state. The Wali Negara could appoint attorneys to represent himself. The Wali Negara could also dissolve the Parliament of Pasundan with a decree, which had to specify the date of the election for the new parliament, which had to take place within two months from the day of the dissolution. The Wali Negara also appointed – and could dismiss – the prime minister, ministers and the other members of the government.

The Wali Negara had the right to submit bills and decrees, which then would be enacted with the consultation of the parliament. The laws that enacted these bills and decrees were named State Orders, and were issued by the Wali Negara. The State Orders had to be signed by the responsible minister and the Minister of Justice. The Wali Negara also had to submit the draft state budget to the Parliament before 15 September each year and the draft had to be returned by the Parliament to the Wali Negara, complete with its approval of the draft state budget, before 15 December each year. The enactment of the budget was through a Wali Negara decree.

Regarding to the regional administration of the State of Pasundan, the Wali Negara had the right to divide or merge regencies and municipalities in the State of Pasundan. The division and merging of the regencies and municipalities had to be in line with the will of the populace.

== Oath of office ==
Before taking office, the Wali-Negara was to be sworn in by the Speaker of the Parliament, in a public session of the Parliament, the oath, reading as follows:

I swear (solemnly declare) that, to be elected as the Wali-Negara, I have not given or premised nor shall give anything to anybody whomsoever, either directly or indirectly under whatever name or pretext.
I swear (solemnly promise) that, to do or omit doing anything in the discharge of m;r duties as Wali Negara, I shall not accept any promise or any present from anybody whomsoever, either directly or indirectly.
I swear (solemnly promise) that I shall respect the legal provisions applicable to the State and protect the general and special freedoms and rights of all inhabitants of the State and, for the maintenance and promotion of general and special prosperity, use all the means which the laws and other regulations place at my disposal, in such a way as befits a good Head of State.
So help me God!
(This I do solemnly declare and promise).

== Line of succession ==
In case of the incapacity, death, or resignation, of the Wali Negara, the Deputy Wali Negara, who acted as the Speaker of Parliament, would assume his or her position. The First Deputy Speaker of the Parliament would assume the position of the Deputy Wali Negara/Speaker of the Parliament. If the Speaker of the Parliament — which in this case was the Wali Negara — was unable to fulfill the position, than the first deputy speaker would assume his or her position, and the second deputy speaker would replace him or her. The same procedure applied to the third deputy speaker.

== List of Wali Negara of Pasundan ==
Portrait	Name (birth and death)	Term of office		Deputy	Prime Ministers	Duration
1	Wiranatakusumah V (1888-1965)	24 April 1948	10 February 1950	Djuarsa	Adil Puradiredja	1 year, 292 days
1	Wiranatakusumah V (1888-1965)	24 April 1948	10 February 1950	Djuarsa	Djumhana Wiriaatmadja	1 year, 292 days
1	Wiranatakusumah V (1888-1965)	24 April 1948	10 February 1950	Djuarsa	Anwar Tjokroaminoto	1 year, 292 days
