= Wiranatakusumah V =

Indonesian noble and politician (1888–1965)

Raden Aria Adipati Wiranatakusumah V
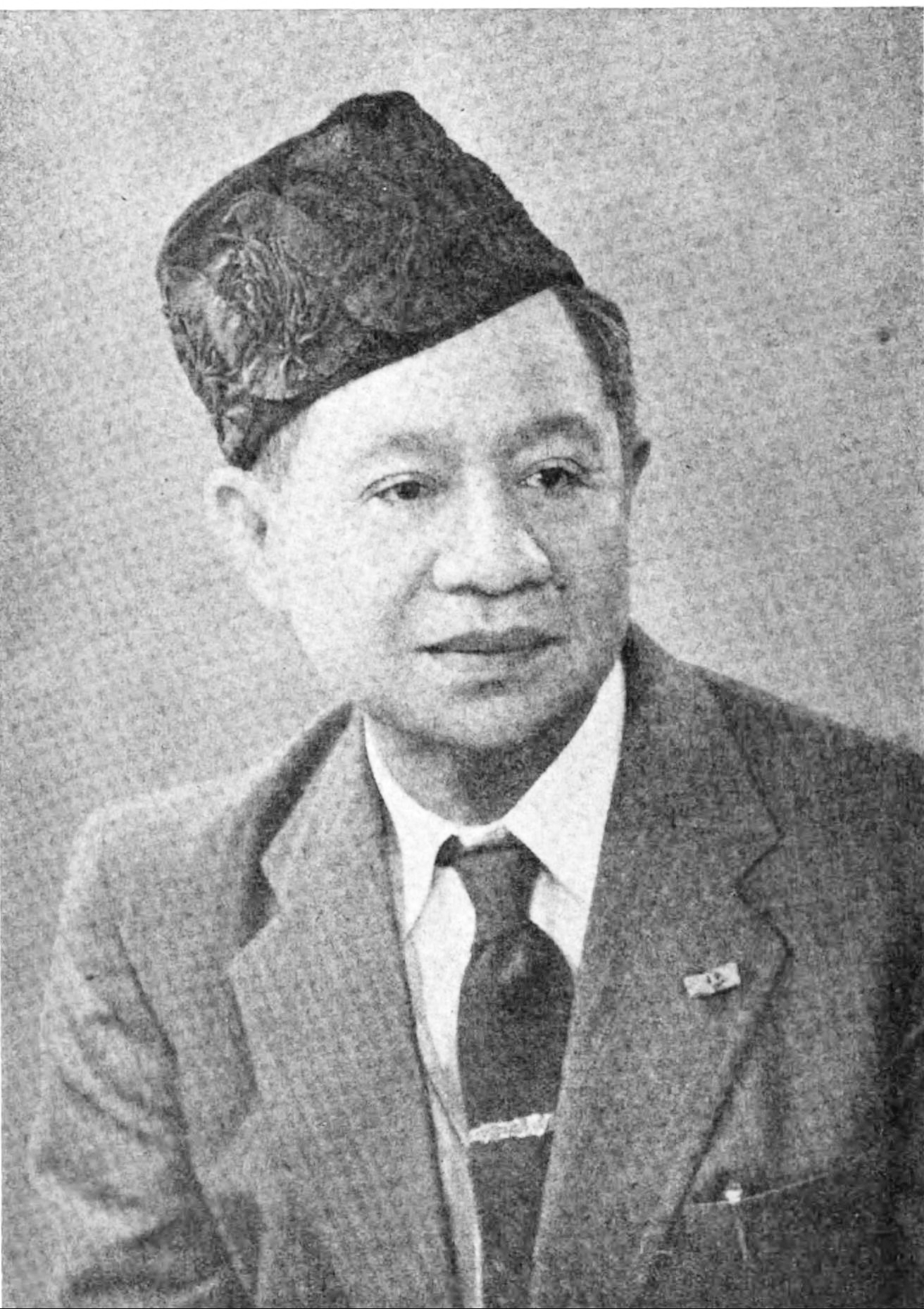
- Official portrait, 1948

Wali Negara of Pasundan
- In office 24 April 1948 – 10 February 1950
- Prime Minister: Adil Puradiredja; Djumhana Wiriaatmadja; Anwar Tjokroaminoto
- Preceded by: Office created
- Succeeded by: Office abolished

Ministerial offices
- 1945–1948: Chairman of the Supreme Advisory Council
- 1945: Minister of Home Affairs

Legislative offices
- 1956–1959: Member of the Constitutional Assembly
- 1945: Member of the Preparatory Committee for Indonesian Independence
- 1945: Member of the Investigating Committee for Preparatory Work for Independence
- 1931–1935 1921–1929: Member of the Volksraad
- 1926: Member of the West Java Provinciale Raad

Other offices
- 1920–1931 1935–1945: Regent of Bandung
- 1912–1920: Regent of Cianjur

Personal details
- Born: Muharam; 23 November 1888 Bandung, Dutch East Indies
- Died: 22 January 1965 (aged 76) Jakarta, Indonesia
- Party: PSII (from 1955)
- Spouse(s): Inda Admini (m. 1910; div. 1911) Cucu Soehanah (m. 1911; div. 1916) Syarifah Nawawi (m. 1916; div. 1924) Oekoen Sangkaningrat (m. 1924; div. 1935) Siti Aisyah (m. 1935; div. 1936) Rohanah Yudabrata (m. 1936; div. 1944) (m. 1945) Euis Koeraesin (m. 1944; div. 1944)
- Children: 24
- Education: Opleiding School Voor Inlandsche Ambtenaren (OSVIA)
- Occupation: Politician

Wiranatakusumah V (EVO: Wiranatakoesoemah V; 23 November 1888 (Note: Another version places his date of birth on 8 August 1888) – 22 January 1965) was an Indonesian noble and politician. He served as the first and only Wali Negara of Pasundan, during the Indonesian National Revolution. He also served as the first Minister of Home Affairs and the second chairman of the Supreme Advisory Council.

He was born on 23 November 1888. He was educated at the Europeesche Lagere School (ELS), the Hogere Burgerschool (HBS), and later the Opleiding School Voor Inlandsche Ambtenaren (OSVIA). His first career in government began when he was a clerk at Wedana Tanjungsari, Sumedang in 1910. One year later, he became a Police Mantri in Cibadak, Sukabumi, and continued with the same position in Sukapura, Tasikmalaya. In 1912, he became Assistant Wedana of Obeureum, Tasikmalaya, before being appointed Regent of Cianjur from 1912 to 1920, and Regent of Bandung from 1920 to 1931 and again from 1935 to 1945. Following the Proclamation of Independence on 17 August 1945, he was appointed by President Sukarno to the office of Minister of Home Affairs of Indonesia, and was later appointed the Chairman of the Supreme Advisory Council. In 1948, he was narrowly elected head of state, or Wali Negara, of the newly created state of Pasundan, with Adil Poeradiredja, being elected prime minister.

He was opposed to the creation of the state, but agreed to serve as Wali Negara at the insistence of the people of West Java and the Indonesian government based in Yogyakarta, despite being ill at the time. On 27 December 1949, the state of Pasundan was the first to rejoin the Republic of Indonesia, and on 8 March 1950, the state itself was dissolved, with Wiranatakusumah V giving up his mandate. Following the end of Pasundan, he remained active in politics. He became a member of the Indonesian Islamic Union Party (PSII), and led the West Java branch of the PSII. In 1955, he was elected to the Constitutional Assembly following the 1955 Constitutional Assembly election, he served until the assembly's dissolution in 1959. He died on 22 January 1965.

== Biography ==
=== Early life and education ===
Raden Aria Adipati Wiranatakusumah V, born only as Raden Muharam, was born in Bandung, on 23 November 1888. His father R. Adipati Koesoemahdilaga, the regent of Bandung, died when he was five years old, resulting in him being taken care of by his mother. He was later taken care of by 3 guardian parents, R. Martanagara, R. Ardinagara, and Suriadiningrat. One of his guardians was an orientalist and Advisor for Indigenous Affairs for the colonial government.

When he was 9 years old, he was sent away to live with the Adams family to receive a western education at the Europeesche Lagere School (ELS), an elementary school for Europeans and indigenous people of noble descent. At the suggestion of professor Christiaan Snouck Hurgronje, he transferred to the Hogere Burgerschool (HBS) in Batavia. He received his diploma in 1910, and continued his education to the Opleiding School Voor Inlandsche Ambtenaren (OSVIA), a school for the priyayi.

=== Pre-independence career ===
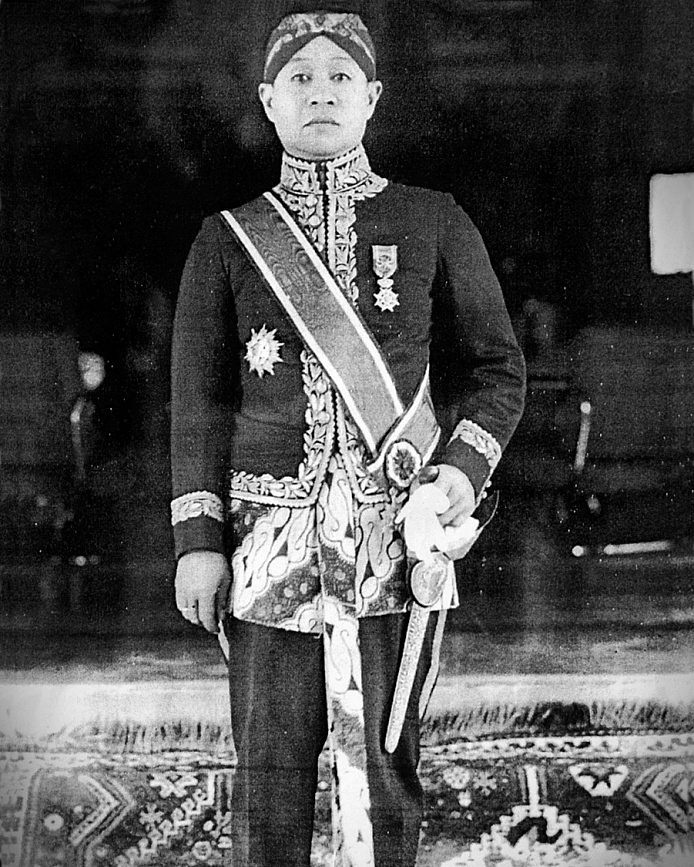
Wiranatakusumah as regent, c. 1920

On 6 July 1910, he was started his civil service career by becoming a clerk at Wedana Tanjungsari, Sumedang. He was then appointed to become a Police Mantri in Cibadak, Sukabumi and continued with the same position in Sukapura, Tasikmalaya. On 19 January 1912, he rose to the position of assistant to the Wedana of Cibeureum, Tasikmalaya. While serving in Tasikmalaya, he wrote a book regarding the management of villages. He was then appointed to the position of Regent of Cianjur, replacing Demang Natakusumah, with a salary of 1200 gulden.

Wiranatakusumah V served as the Regent of Cianjur for eight years, from 1912 until 1920, being replaced by Suriadiningrat. During his tenure, he was successful in advancing the economy of Cianjur, making Cianjur the breadbasket of West Java. He did this by turning the areas of Cihea and Ciranjang from swamps to farmland, by buying 750 hectares of local land and using the local workforce to turn these areas into arable farmland. Following this achievement, he was given further autonomy by the colonial government in managing local affairs. In 1920, he was transferred to Bandung, where became Regent in 1920, to replace the position of the deceased R. Martanagara.

His inauguration as regent took place on 12 April 1920, and it received great attention. With all the Regents in Parahyangan being present at the ceremony, alongside a number of other civil servants and military officers. He served as regent twice, first from 1920 until 1931, and then again from 1935 until 1945. One 18 June 1921, he, to enliven the Java Institute Congress, held a tonil (play) in the courtyard of the Bandung Regency Pendopo. The play was based on the Lutung Kasarung folk tale, a folk tale of Sundanese origin. The performance was described as spectacular, with the Sri Poestaka magazine describing it as:

The sanctity of the narration is evident really in section 13, at the time of the cutting of the paddy. In that part, when some of the gods descended from heaven, carrying all the necessities to cut the rice, one by one knelt and worshiped in order and carefulness; the silence of the play was felt to seep into the bones and marrow stopping the breathing and heartbeat […] The thousands of people were silent and did not say a word, so that in the comedy the yard was lonely and very quiet

— Sri Poestaka magazine, 1921.

In 1920, he was elected to the Volksraad, representing the Sedio Moelio, the association of the regents, and took his seat in 1921. In 1929, he managed to assemble the indigenous lords in the Perhimpoenan Pegawai Bestur Boemipoetra (PPBB). When the province of West Java was created by the colonial government in 1926, Wiranatakusumah V was elected as a member of the Provinciale Raad (Provincial Council). He temporarily gave up his position as regent to move to Batavia in 1931, he regained the position in 1935. During the Japanese occupation of the Dutch East Indies, he remained as regent until 24 June 1945, when he was replaced by Suriaputra.

=== Struggle for Independence ===
Wiranatakusumah V became a member of the Investigating Committee for Preparatory Work for Independence (BPUPK) and the Preparatory Committee for Indonesian Independence (PPKI). Following the Proclamation of Independence on 17 August 1945, he was appointed by President Sukarno to the office of Minister of Home Affairs of Indonesia in the Presidential Cabinet. As minister, he toured all across Java, consolidating local governments to support the Republican government. He only served as minister until November, when the cabinet was dissolved and replaced by the First Sjahrir Cabinet.

On 29 November 1945, he was appointed the Chairman of the Supreme Advisory Council by president Sukarno. In 1948, the third West Java conference, was held from 23 February until 5 March 1948, to elect the government of the newly created state of Pasundan. At this conference, Wiranatakusumah V was narrowly elected head of state, or Wali Negara, with Adil Poeradiredja, the head of the pro-republican faction, being elected prime minister. The delegates to the conference subsequently became the Pasundan parliament. Though he was initially opposed to the creation of the state, he agreed to serve as Wali Negara at the insistence of the people of West Java and the Indonesian government based in Yogyakarta, despite being ill at the time.

=== Wali Negara of Pasundan ===
Coat of arms of Wiranatakusumah as the Wali Negara of Pasundan

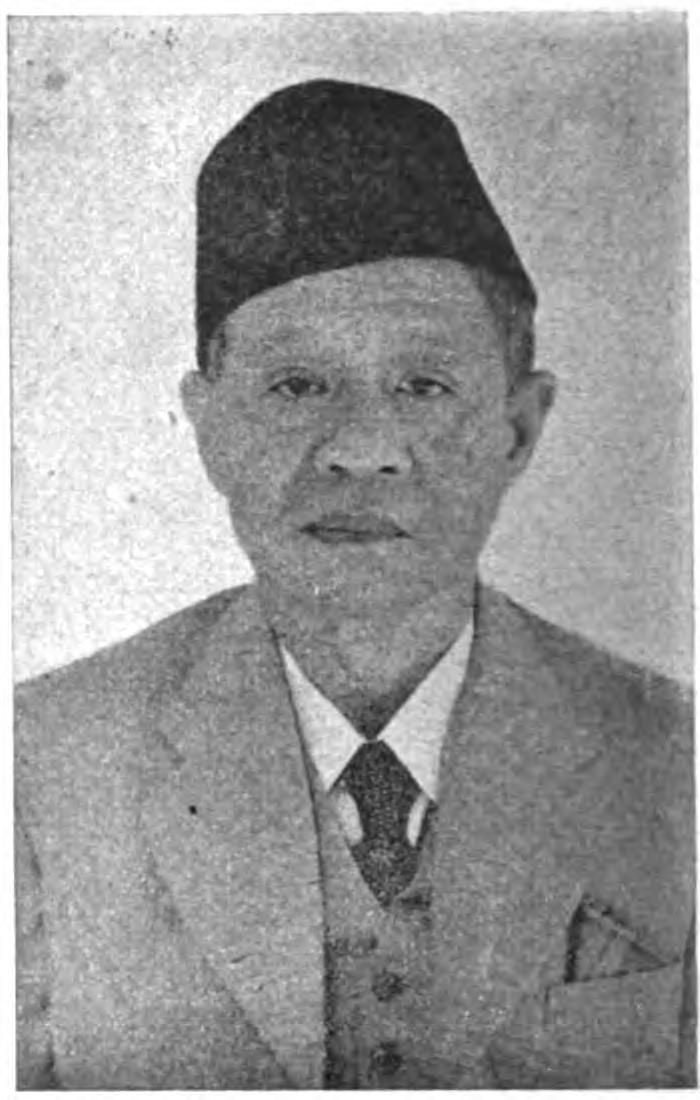
Wiranatakusumah as Wali Negara, c. 1948

On 19 March 1948, Wiranatakusumah finally arrived in the Andir Airfield (now Husein Sastranegara International Airport) in Bandung. He was greeted by the populace of the State of Pasundan. Unexpectedly, a rousing welcome accompanied by a cry of Merdeka (which was an Indonesian salute) prompted the Dutch to arrest several teachers and students who were thought to be responsible for these cry.

Wiranatakusumah V was then inaugurated as Wali Negar on 24 April 1948. The inauguration was attended by the Lieutenant Governor General of the Dutch East Indies, Hubertus van Mook, the General Secretary of the Provisional Federal Government, Abdulkadir Widjojoatmodjo, and the Recomba (government commissioner for administrative affairs) of West Java, Hilman Djajadiningrat.

After the formation of the United States of Indonesia, there war a growing demand by the Pasundan populace to dissolve the state. On 10 February 1950, located at the Pakuan building, the residence of the Wali Negara, Wiranatakusumah, represented by his deputy, Djuarsa, handed over his power as the Wali Negara of Pasundan to the Commisary of the United States of Indonesia for West Java, Sewaka. Then, on 8 March 1950, the state itself was dissolved.

=== Later career and death ===
Following the end of the National Revolution, he remained active in politics. He became a member of the Indonesian Islamic Union Party (PSII), and lead the West Java branch of the PSII. In 1955, he was elected to the Constitutional Assembly following the 1955 Constitutional Assembly election, he served until the assembly's dissolution in 1959. After two years of fighting an illness, he died on 22 January 1965.

== Legacy ==
According to, Historian and biographer, Lip D. Yahya, who wrote a book on Wiranatakusumah V, entitled R.A.A.H.M. Wiranatakusumah V : Kedalaman Yang Belum Terselami, Wiranatakusumah V was of the central figures in the formation of the Republic of Indonesia. With the transfer of power from the Pasundan State having started the momentum for the collapse of other Dutch-backed states. "The Unitary State of the Republic of Indonesia probably would not exist if there was no Pasundan State that joined itself. With him merging Pasundan into the republic (Indonesia), all became weak and followed. This is rarely seen, that he was the first to re-integrate the Pasundan State into Indonesia." Yahya also stated that Wiranatakusumah V deserved to be made a national hero for his efforts to maintain the unity of the Republic of Indonesia, but that "It takes a process. What is clear, let's continue to discuss the figure of Wiranatakusumah V so that it becomes knowledge that is understood by the wider public."

== Works ==
Throughout his life, Wiranatakusumah V, had written a number of works. This includes books, speeches, and other writings. The following is a list of works written by Wiranatakusumah V:

- Preadvies tentang kekuasaan yang patut akan dijalankan oleh Sedio Moelio dalam hal memilih dan mengangkat Lid Volsraad, featured in the Tjaja Hindia magazine, 1917.
- Een En Ander Over Soendaneeshe Muziek, written together with J. Kunst, featured in the Java Instituut magazine, 1921.
- Het Een en Ander Over het Autonoom Regentshap Bandoeng, featured in the Penjoeloeh magazine, 1932.

== Personal life ==
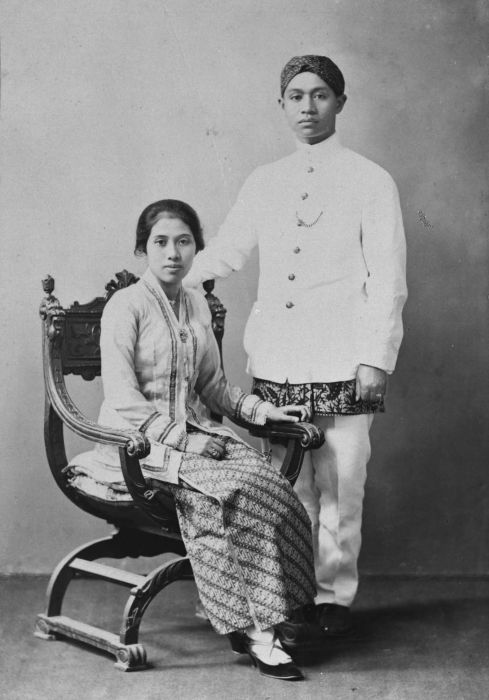
Wiranatakusumah V (right), with his third wife, Syarifah Nawawi (left).

Wiranatakusumah V had 7 different wives, and 24 children, with 12 being male and 12 being female. His first wife was R. A. Inda Admini, whom he married in 1910, however they divorced in 1911. Wiranatakusumah V then remarried to his second wife R. A. Soehanah, until they divorced in 1916. His third wife was Syarifah Nawawi, they had three children, they divorced in 1924. His fourth wife was R. A. Oekoen Sangkaningrat, and they had four children together, however he again divorced her in 1935. His fifth wife was R. A. Siti Aisyah, and they had only a single child, however he divorced her in 1936. He remarried again in 1936 to R. A. Rohanah Yudabrata, he divorced her in 1944. Shortly thereafter he remarried to R. A. Euis Koeraesin, they had a single child together, but again he divorced her, making this his shortest marriage.

== Notes ==
Political offices
Preceded by Office established	Wali Negara of Pasundan; 1948 – 1950	Succeeded by Office disestablished
Preceded by Office established	Minister of Home Affairs; 1945 – 1945	Succeeded by Sutan Sjahrir
Preceded by Hasan Sumadipraja	Regent of Bandung; 1935-1945	Succeeded by Suriaputra
Preceded by R. Martanagara	Regent of Bandung; 1920-1931	Succeeded by Hasan Sumadipraja
Preceded by Demang Natakusumah	Regent of Cianjur; 1912 – 1920	Succeeded by Suriadiningrat
Government offices
Preceded by Margono Djojohadikusumo	Chairman of the Supreme Advisory Council; 1945 – 1948	Succeeded by Ario Soerjo
