= Abdul Fatah Hasan =

Indonesian revolutionary

Kyai Hajji Abdul Fatah Hasan

Deputy Regent of Serang Regency
- In office 1945–1949
- President: Sukarno
- Resident: Tubagus Ahmad Chatib al-Bantani
- Regent: Syam'un

Personal details
- Born: July 1912 Bojonegara, Serang Regency, Banten, Indonesia
- Died: 1949 unknown
- Spouse: Sufiah
- Children: Sutomo A.F. Hasan; Rifki A.F. Hasan
- Parent(s): Hasan Adam; Zainab
- Education: Pesantren Al-Khairiyah; Al-Azhar University
- Occupation: Member of bpupk (from 10 July 1945) and central indonesian national committee
- Awards: Bintang Mahaputera Pratama

Kyai Hajji Abdul Fatah Hasan, better known as Ki Fatah Hasan was an Islamic scholar and fighter for Indonesian Independence. Hasan was also a member of the Investigating Committee for Preparatory Work for Independence (BPUPK) which began meeting on 10 July 1945, after the addition of 6 members of the Indonesian nation at the second hearing.

== Biography ==
=== Early life ===
Hasan was born in the village of Beji, Bojonegara as the eldest son of the Bantenese couple, Hasan Adam and Zainab. His three younger siblings among others are Syadeli Hasan, Abdul Kohar Hasan, dan Hadijah binti Hasan Adam. No one knows exactly when the date of birth, but a lecturer from the University of Indonesia, M. P. B. Manus writes that Hasan was born in 1912.

=== Personal life ===
Hasan married a girl named Sufiah and had two children, Sutomo A.F. Hasan and Rifki A.F. Hasan.

=== Education ===
==== Al-Khairiyah ====
Hasan started his education in 1924 at a Volkschool (people's school). In 1932 he entered the Madrasa Al-Khairiyah Citangkil. Hasan was a student of Brigadier general Kyai Hajji Syam'un, the founder of Pondok Pesantren Al-Khairiyah, where he studied.

==== Al-Azhar University ====
In 1933, Kyai Hajji Syam'un sent Hasan to study at the Faculty of Islamic Law Al-Azhar University. Since in Cairo, Hasan was involved in the political movement at Perhimpoenan Indonesia, which was based in Leiden, Netherlands, under the leadership of Mohammad Hatta.

Hasan was known as one of the active figures in opposing Dutch colonists, even he has been observed by Dutch accomplices deliberately sent from Batavia to investigate Indonesian students who are active in the Perhimpoenan Indonesia in Cairo. But he continues to do political activities and political communication through mass media such as radio broadcasts, bulletins, news Ichwanul Muslim (Muslim Brotherhood), and others.

In 1939, Abdul Fatah Hasan and his younger brother, Syadeli Hasan, were forced to return from Cairo because their parents were no longer able to fund those who would initially continue their education to Sorbonne University, France. After completing his studies in Cairo, Hasan returned to Cilegon to practice his knowledge at Pesantren Al-Khairiyah Citangkil.

== Career ==
Before going to study in Egypt, Hasan had served as commissioner of Nahdlatus Syubanul Mu'min organization in Banten in 1931–1933. After returning from Egypt, in 1940–1942 he served as Serang Regency council. Then in 1942–1945 was appointed a member of Shu Sangi Kai (Residency agency of Banten) who later represented the Banten area as a member of Dokuritsu Zyunbi Tyoosakai (Investigating Committee for Preparatory Work for Independence in Jakarta) that drafted the 1945 Constitution.

Apart from being a member of BPUPK, Hasan also served as a member of Central Indonesian National Committee (KNIP) from 1945 to 1948. Then he served as deputy regent of Serang accompany Kyai Hajji Syam'un as regent.

== Roles and struggles ==
=== During the Japanese occupation ===
During the Japanese occupation of the Dutch East Indies, Syam'un and his disciples fought for Indonesian independence. At that time Hasan, as the main disciple of Syam'un, and who was considered to have a great intellect and insight, was sent appointed to the Investigating Committee for Preparatory Work for Independence (BPUPK) representing the Bantenese people.

=== As a member of BPUPK ===
Abdul Fatah Hasan began to work as a member of the BPUPK on 10 July 1945, at the second official session. Hasan belonged to the committee in charge of discussing finance and economy with chairman Mohammad Hatta. According to Saafroedin Bahar's 1992 book, Hasan was among those who participated in discussing the formation of the state and formulating the basis of the state in 1945, especially in Article 29 (2) of the 1945 Constitution on religious freedom at a meeting of the BPUPK on 15 July 1945.

=== After Indonesian independence ===
After the Proclamation of Indonesian Independence on 17 August 1945, Hasan went back to his Pesantren and helped Kyai Hajji Syam'un, who became Regent of Serang Regency.

However, when the Dutch launcher their Operation Kraai, Syam'un and Hasan (who then become Deputy Regent of Serang) intensively conducted guerrilla warfare in the mountains in order to defend the Banten region from the Dutch. It was during these guerrilla actions that many Banten fighters were killed in hiding places, including Kyai Hajji Syam'un, who died in the hills of Kamasan-Anyer. Hasan did not return home, and it is unknown whether he was captured by the Dutch or died on the battlefield.

== Awards ==
In recognition of the role and contribution of Abdul Fatah Hasan in the struggle for Indonesian independence, in 1992 he was awarded Bintang Mahaputera Pratama by Suharto, as the President of the Republic of Indonesia at that time. This award was decided by Presidential Decree No.048 / TK / TH 1992; 12 August 1992.
