= Syam'un =

Indonesian independence fighter and Islamic scholar

Brigadier General Kyai Hajji Syam'un
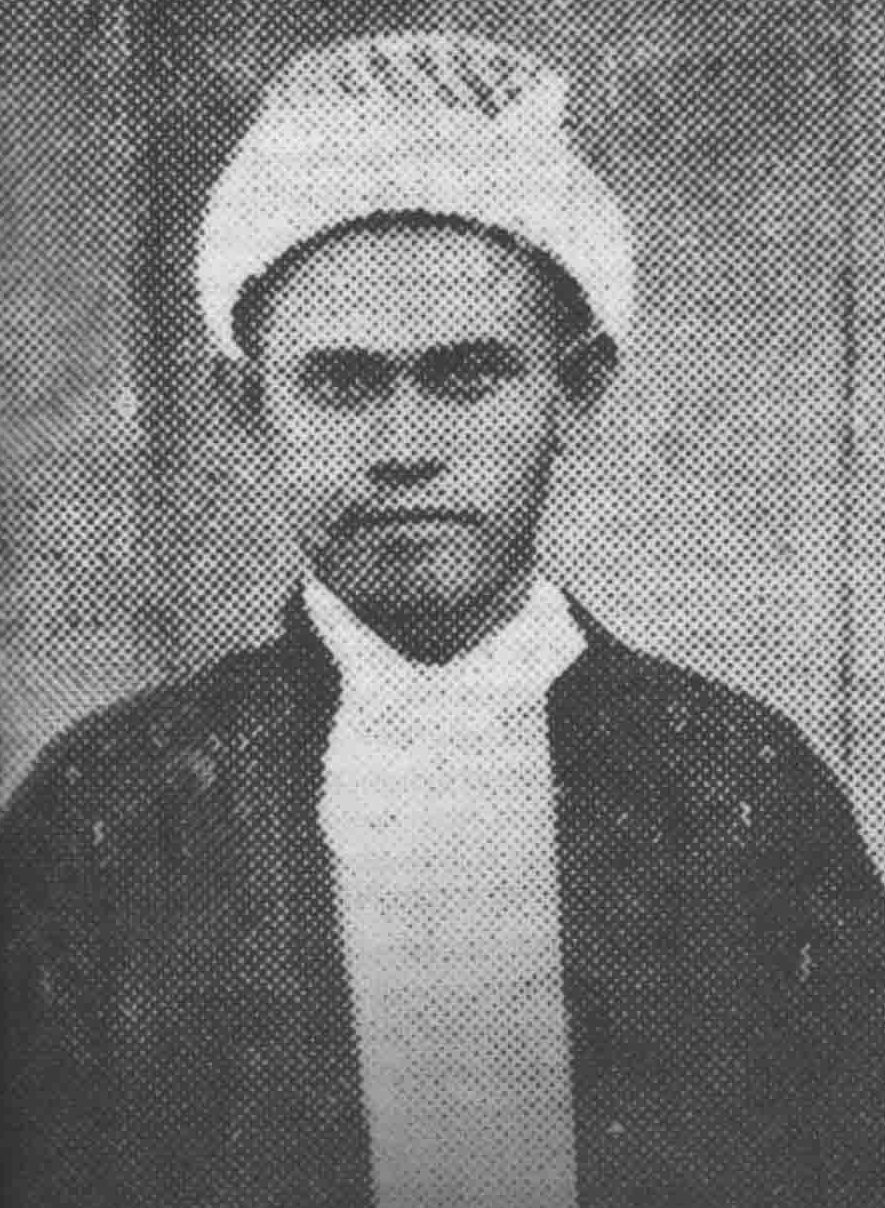
- Ki Syam'un

Regent of Serang Regency
- In office 1945–1949
- President: Sukarno
- Resident: Tubagus Ahmad Chatib al-Bantani
- Deputy: Abdul Fatah Hasan
- Preceded by: Hilman Djajadiningrat
- Succeeded by: Mas Parmadidjaja

Personal details
- Born: 5 April 1894 Beji, Bojonegara, Serang Regency, Banten, Dutch East Indies
- Died: 28 February 1949 (aged 54) Cinangka, Serang Regency, Banten, Indonesia
- Children: Fathullah Syam'un; Hikmatullah A. Syam'un
- Parent(s): Alwiyan; Siti Hajar
- Relatives: Ki Wasyid (grandfather)
- Education: Al-Azhar University
- Occupation: Founder of al-khairiyah

Military service
- Allegiance: Indonesia
- Branch/service: Indonesian Army
- Years of service: 1945–1949
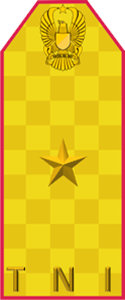
- Rank: Brigadier General

Brigadier General Kyai Hajji Syam'un (Note: After the time of his death, Syam'un was promoted posthumously (Indonesian: anumerta) to the rank Brigadier general Indonesian National Armed Forces.) (5 April 1894 – 28 February 1949) better known as Ki Syam'un was an Islamic scholar and fighter for Indonesian Independence. In 1916, Syam'un founded the Pesantren Al-Khairiyah, which in subsequent development became Al-Khairiyah Islamic College as an educational institution and organization. Syam'un received military education during the Japanese occupation of the Dutch East Indies and was later appointed Battalion Commander (Daidancho) in the Pembela Tanah Air volunteer army. In 1945, he was appointed regent of Serang until his death in 1949.He was awarded the title National Hero of Indonesia in 2018.
