= Arsyad Thawil al-Bantani =

Islamic scholars

Kyai Hajji Mas Mohammad Arsyad Thawil al-Bantani
- Title: Sheikh

Personal life
- Born: Mas Mohammad Arsyad; 1851 Tanara, Serang, Banten
- Died: March 19, 1934 (aged 82–83) Manado, Dutch East Indies
- Resting place: Lawangirung, Wenang, Manado, North Sulawesi
- Region: Banten & Minahasa (Dutch East Indies)
- Main interest(s): Arabic grammar, tawhid, fiqh, hadith
- Other name: Hajji Arsyad Thawil
- Occupation: Islamic scholars

Religious life
- Religion: Islam
- Denomination: Sunni
- Jurisprudence: Shafi'i
- Tariqa: Qadiriyya wa Naqshbandiyya
- Creed: Ash'ari

Muslim leader
- Disciple of: See below
- Influenced by: Nawawi al-Bantani Ahmad Zayni Dahlan
- Influenced: Muhammad Yasin Al-Fadani Salim bin Djindan

Sheikh Mas Mohammad Arsyad Thawil al-Bantani (1851 – March 19, 1934) better known as Sheikh Arsyad Thawil was an ulama (Islamic scholar) and Indonesian hero who fought on the Cilegon War from 9 to 30 July 1888 with Ki Wasyid, Tubagus Ismail, and others. Thawil was a student of Sheikh Nawawi al-Bantani, an Indonesian Islamic teacher from Banten who became the Imam of the Great Mosque of Mecca.

In December 1945, Sukarno, as the president of Indonesia delivered a speech before the people of Banten in Serang square. At the beginning of his speech, Sukarno mentioned that Arsyad Thawil was a great hero from Banten.

== Biography ==
=== Early life ===
Thawil was born in Lempuyang village, Tanara, Serang Regency. His father was a Bantenese named Imam As'ad bin Mustafa bin As'ad, while his mother was Ayu Nazham. No one knows the exact of date and year of his birth, but on his tombstone it was written that he was born in 1851 AD.

Thawil was born under the name of Mas Mohammad Arsyad. The nickname "Mas" was an abbreviation of Permas, a Bantenese noble title that was a descendant of the sultanate. While, named Thawil (Arabic: ﻃﻮﻳﻞ, romanized: ṭawīl) which means long because there was a friend named Shaikh Arsyad Qashir al-Bantani, Qashir (Arabic: ﻗﺼﻴﺮ, romanized: qaṣīr) was mean short. Therefore, to distinguish him from Arsyad Qashir, his friends then pinned Thawil's name behind his name.

=== Education ===
Thawil received basic Islamic religious education such as reading al-Quran from his father directly, Imam As'ad who was also a cleric at his pesantren at Tanara. In addition, he also studied other sciences such as nahwu (arabic grammar), sharaf (morphology), fiqh, and tawhid from his father.

In 1867 when Thawil was 16 years old, he went to Bima to study with Sheikh Abdul Gani. But only arrived in Surabaya he met his prospective teacher who will carry out hajj to Mecca, next he expressed his desire to learn from him. Then Sheikh Abdul Gani accepted Thawil as a disciple as well as invite him to go to Mecca together.

At Masjid al-Haram, Thawil followed the lesson given by Ahmad Zayni Dahlan, Mufti of Mecca, especially regarding nahwu, fiqh, and al-sīra al-Nabawiyya. In addition studying to Ahmad Zayni Dahlan, Thawil also studied with some cleric in Mecca, among them Sheikh Nawawi al-Bantani and Sayyid Abu Bakri Syatha (under the guidance of his two sons, Sayyid Umar Syatha and Sayyid Uthman Syatha).

Thawil deepens the science of hadith to Habib Muhammad ibn Husein al-Habsyi al-Makki under the guidance of his son, Mufti al-Muhaddits al-Habib Husayn ibn Muhammad al-Habsyi al-Makki. In addition, Thawil also obtained the study of the hadith from the Medina cleric, Sheikh Abdul Ghani bin Abi Sa'id al-Mujaddidi under the guidance of some of his disciples, Sayyid Ali bin Zhahir al-Watri, Sheikh Shalih bin Muhammad az-Zhahiri, and Sheikh Abdul Jalil Barradah. As for the science of fiqh, Thawil also deepens it to Sheikh Muhammad bin Sulaiman Hasbullah al-Makki.

=== Personal life ===
Thawil married in his exile in Manado with a Minahasa girl of a local pastor named Magdalena Runtu (b. 1880; d. 1937), who after converting to Islam changed her name into Tarhimah Magdalena Runtu.

== Close relationship with Sheikh Nawawi ==
For five years (from 1868 to 1873), Thawil was a disciple of the Meccan cleric who also came from Banten, Sheikh Nawawi al-Bantani. One day, Sheikh Nawawi sent his work in the form of a manuscript (kitab) to Egyptian cleric, but the work was rejected and returned in code form. After the code was received, Sheikh Nawawi then replied it with the same code. Receiving a shipment of codes from Sheikh Nawawi, the Egyptian scholar was very surprised because only certain scholars of highly knowledgeable scholars could understand the code. To cure the curiosity, the Egyptian scholars agreed to invite Sheikh Nawawi for questioning. Sheikh Nawawi also fulfilled the invitation of the Egyptian scholars and invited Thawil as his pupil to play and swap places (Sheikh Nawawi became Thawil, as well as vice versa).

The arrival of the Banten cleric was welcomed by Egyptian scholars albeit without ceremony. In the presence of the Egyptian scholar, Thawil, who performed as Sheikh Nawawi sat on a chair, while Sheikh Nawawi sat down as a bodyguard. Many questions were asked by Egyptian scholars who were not easy to answer by any scholar. As Sheikh Nawawi, Thawil also ordered his bodyguard (who was none other than Sheikh Nawawi) to answer these questions, then all questions asked were answered satisfactorily by Syekh Nawawi who acted as bodyguard of Thawil. The Egyptian scholars were amazed to hear such a satisfactory answer, So they think that his bodyguard was so great, let alone who guarded, surely more great.

After the invitation, Indonesian clerics were increasingly respected. The work of Sheikh Nawawi who was rejected by Egyptian publishers began to be published. This also affected the good respect to the Indonesian clerics by Egyptian scholars at that time.

== Roles and struggles ==
=== Cilegon War ===
In 1893, Thawil returned to his homeland of Banten. At the time, Banten was facing a series of crises. The 1883 eruption of Krakatoa which claimed at least 36,417 deaths, followed by an outbreak of animal diseases in 1885 caused living standards to plummet and inadvertently made the people believe in superstition and shamanism. To add to the already difficult lives of the people, the Dutch colonial government imposed harsh and unfair regulations towards the population.

In response to the Dutch unfair treatment of the population, the ulama and the Muslim populace decided to launch a rebellion which was approved by Sheikh Nawawi al-Bantani in Mecca along with many other notable ulamas. The Muslims of Banten initiated a jihad with Arsyad Thawil playing a decisive role which made him a sought-after target by the colonial government.

When the rebellion was suppressed, the Dutch arrested and exiled many Bantenese ulama into far provinces of the East Indies where it was difficult for them to re-organize another rebellion. The exiled destinations for many notable ulama included the Banda Islands, Bukittingi, Buton, Flores, Manado and among others.

== Activity ==
=== In Mecca ===
On February 27, 1879, Thawil was made a Sheikh (taking care of the hajj who came from Indonesia), and since there were two Arsyads from Indonesia, he was called Arsyad "Thawil" (arabic: tall) and one more was Arsyad "Qasir" (arabic: short). When take care of Hajj he then often visited the Dutch consulate office in Jeddah and became acquainted with Christiaan Snouck Hurgronje who eventually became his friend in discussing the teachings of Islam.

=== In the place of exile ===
After the defeat in the Cilegon War he was caught along with 100 other fighters. He was put in prison in Serang, then moved to Batavia. When imprisoned in Batavia Snouck Hurgronje met him, but that friendship did not changing his status as a prisoner. Not long after being imprisoned in Batavia, he then dumped to Manado, North Sulawesi.

Sheikh Arsyad Thawil actively teaches peoples in his exile place, Manado. He teaches in the field of Islamic sciences, among them are fiqh, nahwu-sharaf, tasawwuf, hadith and others. No less hundreds of scholars from Manado, Gorontalo, Ambon, Ternate, Poso Regency, Tolitoli Regency, Donggala Regency and other areas studied to Sheikh Arsyad. He was also recognized as one of the carriers of Islam to region of the Christians majority in Indonesia. Even, he married the girl of pastor who had converted to Islam, named Magdalena Runtu.

Thawil died in Manado, North Sulawesi, on Monday, 14 Zulhijah 1353 AH or 19 March 1935 AD. The Imam of his Janazah prayer is al-Habib Hasan bin Abdur Rahman Maula Khailah al-'Alawi.

== Appreciation ==
The name Arsyad Thawil then enshrined into the name of a mosque in Komo Luar, Wenang, Manado by the name Kyai Hajji Arsyad Thawil mosque. The Commemoration of the day of his death is always held every year in this mosque.

On the 79th anniversary of his death, the Provincial Office of Social Affairs of North Sulawesi will file Arsyad Thawil as a national hero.
