= Syarifah Nawawi =

Indonesian activist and educationist

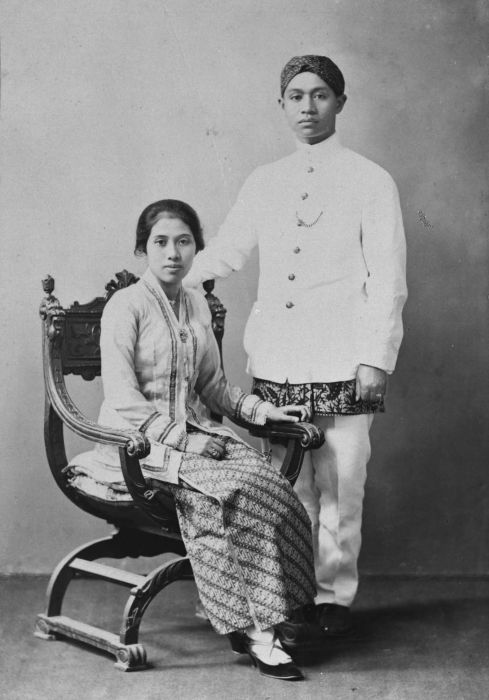
- Born: 1896; Fort de Kock, Dutch East Indies
- Died: 1988 (aged 91–92)
- Occupations: Activist; educationist

Syarifah Nawawi (1896–1988) was an Indonesian activist and educationist. Nawawi worked to promote educational reform in the Dutch East Indies and later Indonesia, placing special emphasis on women's and children's education.

== Biography ==
Nawawi was born in Bukittinggi, West Sumatra, then part of the Dutch East Indies. She was the daughter of Nawawi Soetan Makmoer, himself a strong advocate for educational reform in Sumatra. She was educated at the European-style Kweekschool in Bukittinggi, where her father worked as a teacher. She graduated in 1916, and in doing so became one of the first Minangkabau woman to receive a western education. She moved to Battavia and worked as a teacher, eventually marrying Wiranatakusumah V. The couple had three children before Wiranatakusumah divorced Nawawi in 1924, an act which caused a minor scandal; Nawawi's daughter, Mien Soedarpo (1924–2013) would become a prominent independence activist.

Nawawi returned to Bukittinggi after her divorce, living in the city and working as the headmistress of a girls' school until the death of her parents in 1937, after which she returned to Batavia. She had her children educated at the elite Koning Willem III School te Batavia. She also worked to reform women's education in Jatinegara by forming an educational organization there. During World War II and the Japanese occupation of the Dutch East Indies, she joined the Buddhist Women's Association. In 1955 she joined PERWARI, a women's rights movement that also participated in the Indonesian independence movement. She continued advocating for education until her death in 1988.
