= Ki Wasyid =

Kyai Hajji Wasyid bin Muhammad Abbas
- Born: Qosyid; 1843; Ciwandan, Cilegon, Banten
- Died: July 30, 1888 (aged 44–45); Cilegon, Banten
- Cause of death: Shahid
- Other name: Ki Wasyid
- Occupations: Islamic scholars, fighters, qadi
- Known for: Leader of the Cilegon War
- Spouse: Atikah
- Partner(s): Tubagus Ismail; Arsyad Thawil al-Bantani
- Children: Muhammad Yasin; Siti Hajar
- Parent(s): Muhammad Abbas (father); Johariah (mother)
- Relatives: Syam'un (grandchild)
- Influences: Nawawi al-Bantani; Abdul Karim al-Bantani

Kyai Hajji Wasyid bin Muhammad Abbas (born Qosyid; 1843 – 30 July 1888) better known as Ki Wasyid, was an Indonesian hero who led the Cilegon War on July 9, 1888, until his fall on the battlefield on July 30, 1888, in Banten. In practice, Ki Wasyid's movement in the war was heavily influenced by the thinking of his teachers: Nawawi al-Bantani and Abdul Karim al-Bantani, a murshid of Qadiriyyah wa Naqshbandiyah tariqa (Sufi order).

In his struggle, he has strategic skills and capabilities, such as how he conducts political communications with ulama, jawara, and other fighters in Banten and outside Banten to engage in war against the Dutch colonialists.

== Biography ==
=== Early life ===
Wasyid was born in 1843 in the village of Delingseng, Ciwandan, Cilegon, Banten. He was born as the only child from Bantenese couple, Kyai Muhammad Abbas and Njai Johariah. From his father and mother line, he was the descendant of a fighter, that was Ki Mas Jong. His complete lineage was Ki Wasyid bin Ki Abbas bin Ki Qoshdu bin Ki Jauhari bin Ki Mas Jong. Ki Mas Jong was the right-hand man of Prabu Pucuk Umun, king of Pajajaran. After the defeat of the Kingdom of Sunda by the Sultanate of Banten, he then converted to Islam and became a right-hand man of Maulana Hasanuddin, sultan of Banten.

Wasyid was born from a family of rebels against the invaders. His father, Abbas, took part in the Wakhia uprising (Gudang Batu war) in 1850. Wasyid young grew up in exile because his father often took his family to move places to avoid the pursuit of Dutch troops.

=== Education ===
Wasyid obtained first education like a basic religious science from his father who was also a fighter and religious teacher. He also once studied to Ki Wakhia, a friend of his father who led the Gudang Batu war in Serang. He then took education to local pesantren in West Java, Central Java, and East Java.

After obtaining education at local pesantren, Wasyid then deepen his religious knowledge in Mecca while performing Hajj. In the holy land he studied to Sheikh Nawawi al-Bantani. Upon his return from Mecca, Wasyid traveled extensively from kampong to kampong to fulfill the invitation of the people to preach. In addition to preaching, he also taught at his pesantren in Beji Village, Cilegon. The three principal teachings distributed to his students are about tawhid, fiqh, and tasawwuf. Together with his comrades: Hajji Abdurahman, Hajji Akib, Hajji Haris, Hajji Arsyad Thawil al-Bantani, Hajji Arsyad Qashir, and Hajji Tubagus Ismail, they spread the teachings of Islam to the people.

=== Personal life ===
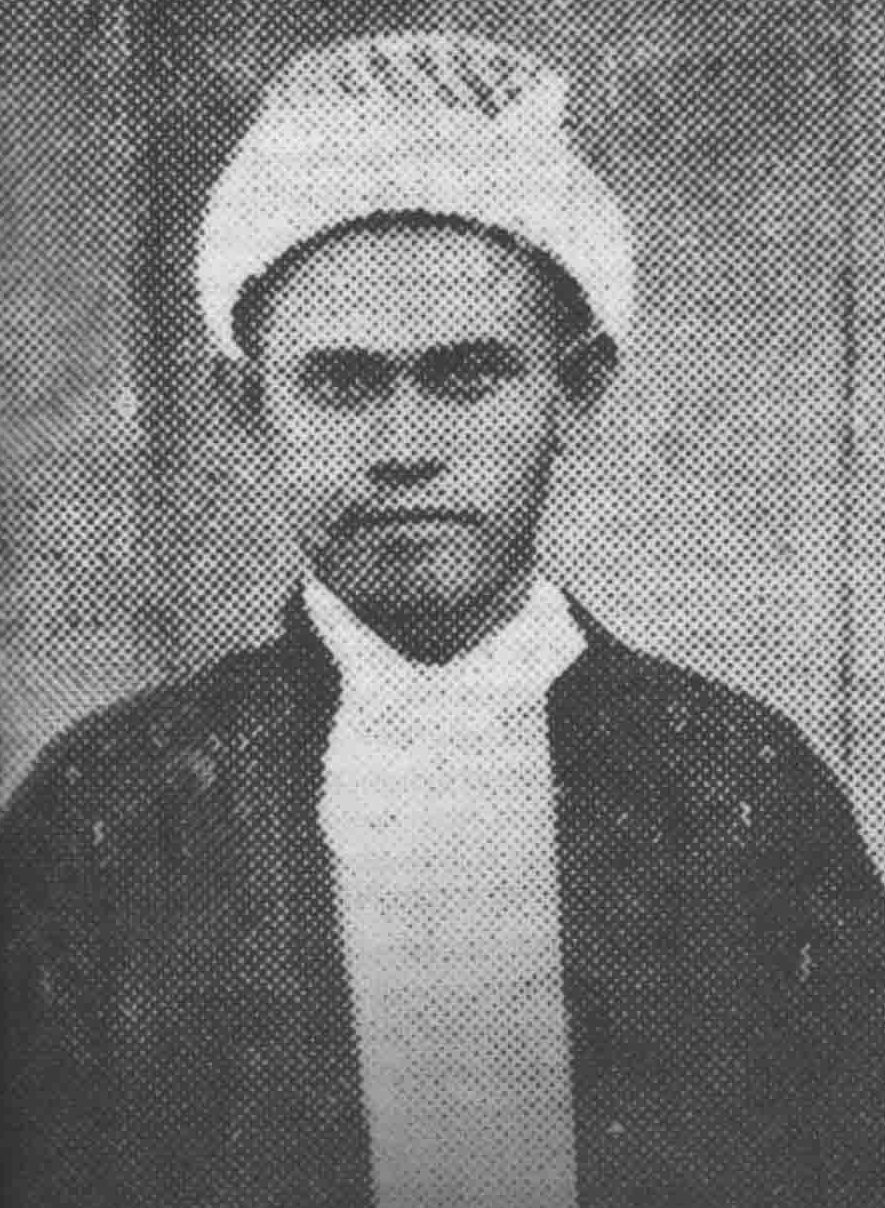
Syam'un, grandchild of Wasyid

Wasyid married Atikah, a girl from Beji, Cilegon. From his marriage he was blessed with two children: Muhammad Yasin and Siti Hajar. Siti Hajar was married to Ki Alwi and has a son named Syam'un who was an Indonesian Independence fighter figure, founder of Al-Khairiyah Citangkil, and Regent of Serang period 1945-1949.

== Activity ==
=== Qadi ===
In addition to being a fighter and scholar who mastered the science of religion, before the outbreak of Cilegon War, Wasyid also served as an advisor to the Supreme Court (qadi) in Afdeling Cilegon.

=== Da'wah ===
Wasyid was known as an ulama who preaches from one place to another to rekindle the spirit of jihad and invite people away from the act of shirk in the midst of a society that at that time trust in superstition.

In 1887 before the Cilegon War, in the village of Lebak Kelapa, there was a big tree that was worshiped and considered sacred, able to destroy the disaster and grant the request as long as giving offerings to Jinn. Time and again Wasyid reminded the peoples that asking other than to Allah is shirk, but the warning was ignored. Seeing this situation Wasyid with some of his students cut down the idols trees at night. The destruction of the tree raises the anger of the tree owner. He then complain the incident to the Dutch government with allegations that Wasyid has done damage and harming him as the tree owner. On these charges Wasyid was finally arrested and tried in a colonial court on November 18, 1887. Wasyid was punishable by whip and imprisonment, and was fined 7.50 guilders.

=== Cilegon War ===
Wasyid was a Cilegon warlord (Geger Cilegon 1888) or also known as Wasyid war. The factors behind this event have been described by Wasyid: first, two colonial government officials, the patih and prosecutors have forbidden Muslims to worship in the mosque. Second, the increase in boat taxes and other business taxes. Thirdly, officials disregarded the kyai, even hostile to Islam, forbidding prayers aloud and forbidding to make towers of high mosques, and spreading too many spies to find fault with those who violate the rules.

Driven by these factors, Wasyid made a plan and organized all elements of the people of Banten to take the fight. Wasyid holds meetings in various places and uses tariqa as a gathering place and together performs prayer and dhikr. Wasyid and other kyai can meet on this occasion to organize strategies, tactics, and coordination.

One of the important meetings before the uprising was a meeting on April 22, 1888, held at Wasyid's residence in Beji. At the end of the banquet, 300 guests gathered at the mosque, where the kyai and their disciples swore: first, that they would take part in a war; secondly, that those who break the promise will be regarded as kafir; third, that they will not divulge their plans to outsiders.

On the sidelines of preoccupation three months before the battle, Wasyid led the preparations of war by promoting the practice of pencak silat, the gathering and making of weapons, and burning the spirit through his sermons to wage war and jihad.

On June 15, 1888, several prominent leaders met at Wasyid's house in Beji, where they talked about the date of the start of the attack. They reached an agreement that the uprising would begin on July 12. However, after the meeting of June 22, 1888, the date of the rebellion was changed to 9 July 1888. This was because Wasyid and Hajji Iskak called for an immediate rebellion in anticipation of the possibility of their plans known by government officials.

As the chief of operations, Wasyid began to organize attack strategy, he divided troops in several groups each tasked to attack prison, the other freed prisoners, attacked Kepatihan, and attacked the Assistant Resident's house. On Monday, July 9, 1888, the war began and in the afternoon, Cilegon could be occupied by Wasyid and his troops. However, under the command of captain A.A. Veen Huyzen, the Dutch perform operations to break the resistance and do chase against Wasyid and his friends. The fighting continued until 30 July 1888, where Wasyid, Hajji Tubagus Ismail, Hajji Usman, and Hajji Abdul Gani were killed on the battlefield as shuhada and heroes of Cilegon War.

== Appreciation ==
On September 25, 2013, Wasyid's fighting story in Cilegon's war was lifted into a film titled "Ki Wasyid: Di Balik Jihad sang Pejuang 1888", directed by Darwin Mahesa and produced by Kremov Pictures.

To commemorate his struggle, the Banten Provincial Government will then propose Wasyid as the National Hero of Indonesia.
