= Hilman Djajadiningrat =

Indonesian aristocrat and politician

Raden Adipati Aria Hilman Djajadiningrat
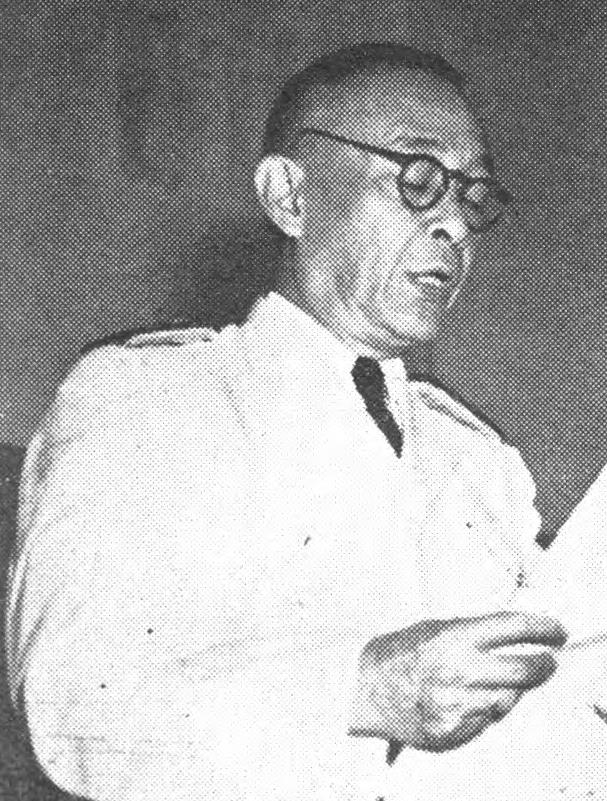

Governor of the Federal Region of Batavia
- In office 2 November 1948 – 30 March 1950
- Prime Minister: Adil Puradiredja; Djumhana Wiriaatmadja; Anwar Tjokroaminoto
- Preceded by: Suwiryo (as Mayor of Jakarta)
- Succeeded by: Suwiryo (as Mayor of Jakarta)

Regent of Serang
- In office 1935–1945
- Preceded by: R.A.A. Abas Soerianata Atmadja
- Succeeded by: Syam'un

Acting Regent of Sukabumi
- In office 1947–1947
- Preceded by: Haroen
- Succeeded by: R.A.A. Soeriadanoeningrat

Personal details
- Born: 28 February 1896 Serang Regency, Banten, Dutch East Indies
- Died: 25 November 1963 (aged 67) Serang Regency, Banten, Indonesia
- Relations: Achmad Djajadiningrat (brother)

Hilman Djajadiningrat (EYD: Hilman Jayadiningrat, 28 February 1896 – 25 November 1963) was an Indonesian aristocrat and politician.

Born in Serang Regency, Hilman entered bureaucracy after finished studying in the Hogere Burgerschool. He began to work as a clerk in the Residential Office of Jakarta, and later became the wedana for several kawedanan (subdistrict) in West Java. After Indonesia's independence, he sided with the pro-Dutch faction against the pro-Indonesian faction and ran as the candidate for the Wali Negara of Pasundan before losing to Wiranatakusumah V. He was later appointed as the Governor of the Federal Region of Batavia following the formation of the region.

== Early life and education ==
Hilman was born in Serang Regency, Banten, then part of the Dutch East Indies, on 28 February 1896. He was part of the Djajadiningrat family, a notable noble family in Serang Regency. He was the son of Raden Bagus Djajawinata and Ratu Salehah.

He studied at the Europeesche Lagere School (European Primary School) and the Hogere Burgerschool (Higher Civic School), graduating from the latter in 1917.

== Career ==
=== Dutch East Indies era ===
After graduating, Hilman worked as a civil servant for the clerk in the Residential Office of Jakarta . He was appointed as the Patih (district secretary) for Jatinegara in 1918. After becoming a Patih, he was appointed as mantripolitie (a title for indigenous officials) to Karawang in 1920. He was later appointed as the Asisten Wedana (deputy chief of subdistrict) for Jatinegara in 1922 and Cirebon in 1929. He later rose up and became the Wedana (chief of subdistrict) for Indramayu in 1933, and the regent for Serang Regency from 1935 until 1945.

=== Japanese occupation era ===
After the Japanese occupied Java, the Japanese promised independence for the Indonesian people. To show the promise, the Japanese appointed several indigenous aristocrats to hold positions that were previously held by the Dutch. Hilman was appointed as the resident of the Banten Residency on 29 April 1942.

=== Post-independence ===
After independence, a wave of social revolution occurred in Banten. The position of the Resident of Banten was replaced by KH. Syam’un, a Republican religious leader (now National Hero of Indonesia). Even though he was a Republican, he didn't replace the position of the regent which was held by pro-Dutch aristocrats, such as Hilman who was still the regent of Serang Regency. Syam'un considered that these group of regents were more competent in governing their regencies. This caused peasants and local warrior groups in Banten outraged, and in October 1945, a group of warriors named themselves Gulkut Warriors kidnapped and imprisoned Hilman in the Serang Prison. Hilman was freed in January 1946 by the Indonesian army, and he fled to Sukabumi. He then briefly served as the acting regent of Sukabumi in 1947.

== Formation of the State of Pasundan ==
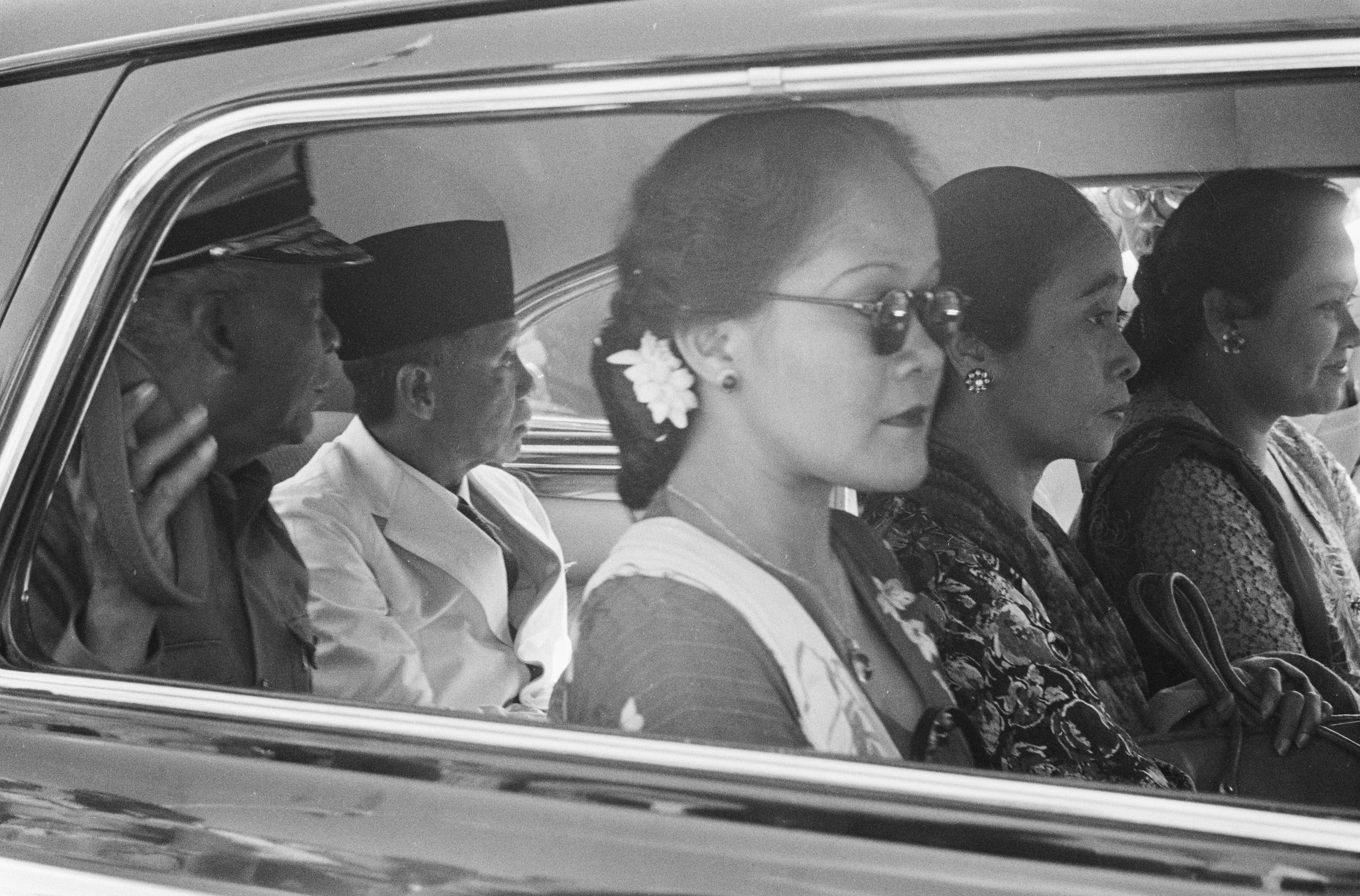
Hilman (left) and Wiranatakusumah (right)

When the Dutch were preparing to establish the State of Pasundan, the Dutch appointed a Recomba (government commissioner for administrative affairs) of West Java. The Recomba, Abdulkadir Widjojoatmodjo, held the First and Second Bandung Conference with the intent of gathering influential people in West Java in order to support the formation of the state. The conference was headed by Hilman.

In the third conference, Hilman was already appointed as Recomba, replacing Abdulkadir. As the leader of the federalists (pro-Dutch) faction in the conference, he ran as the candidate from the federalist's faction for the Wali Negara (head of state) of the State of Pasundan in the Wali Negara election. His opponent was Wiranatakusumah V, a staunch Republican (pro-Indonesia) and the first Minister of Home Affairs of Indonesia. He lost to Wiranatakusumah by 45–55.

== Governor of Jakarta ==
=== Appointment ===
After the formation of the State of Pasundan, the city of Batavia (now Jakarta) was integrated into the state as the Federal Region of Batavia. Hilman was appointed as the Governor of the Federal Region of Batavia on 2 November 1948.

=== Satellite city of Kebayoran Baru ===
During his term, the government of Jakarta envisaged the idea to build a satellite town at Kebayoran Baru in order to accommodate the growing population of Jakarta. When the decision to build a satellite town at Kebayoran Baru was taken, the state hurried to acquire the full 600 hectares for the project. The owners of the land in Kebayoran Baru asked excessive prices for their land and were loath to enter in serious negotiations. After a month of fruitless talks, the government gave up and decided to start procedures to expropriate the land. However, on 15 November, Hilman held a preliminary talk with the wedana, Mas'oed, the core of the resistance. The talk was about his plan to persuade the people in order to give up their land.

Five days later, Hilman held an open meeting with the landowners. Hilman explained the purpose of the land, and without further ado, the governor and the landowners agreed on a price. Hilman offered slightly more than had been offered before, so owners could concede without a losing face. Hilman accepted the fact that the costs were four million guilders more than the government had expected.

=== Handover to Suwiryo ===
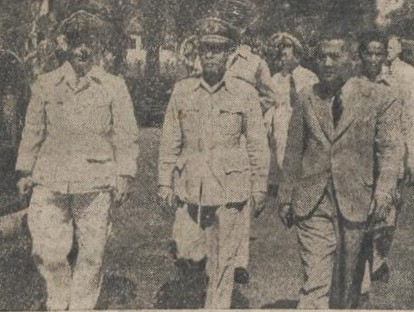
Hilman Djajadiningrat (center) and Sastromoeljono (right)

After the State of Pasundan was dissolved, the Federal Region of Batavia (renamed to Federal Region of Jakarta) existed for a short time under the Republic of Indonesia. The Federal Region of Jakarta was dissolved on 30 March 1950 when Hilman as the governor and Sastromoeljono as the Mayor of Batavia handed over their position to Suwiryo as the Mayor of Jakarta.

== Bibliography ==
- Gunseikanbu (1944). Orang Indonesia jang Terkemoeka di Djawa (in Indonesian).
- Maulana; et al. (2017). Bahan Materi Film Sejarah Berita Proklamasi Kemerdekaan di Indonesia (PDF) (in Indonesian). Minister of Education and Culture of Indonesia. ISBN 978-602-1289-73-0.
- Persekutuan Gereja-Gereja di Indonesia (1984). Peninjau (in Indonesian). Vol. 11.
- Schiller, A. Arthur (1955), The Formation of Federal Indonesia 1945-1949, The Hague: W. van Hoeve Ltd
- Toer, Pramoedya Ananta; Toer, Koesalah Soebagyo; Kamil, Ediati (1999). Kronik revolusi Indonesia: 1948 (in Indonesian). Kepustakaan Populer Gramedia. ISBN 9789799023278.
- Colombijn, Freek (2013). Under Construction: The Politics of Urban Space and Housing during the Decolonization of Indonesia, 1930-1960. BRILL. ISBN 9789004263932.
