= Abdulkadir Widjojoatmodjo =

Dutch politician (1904–1992)

Raden Abdulkadir Widjojoatmodjo
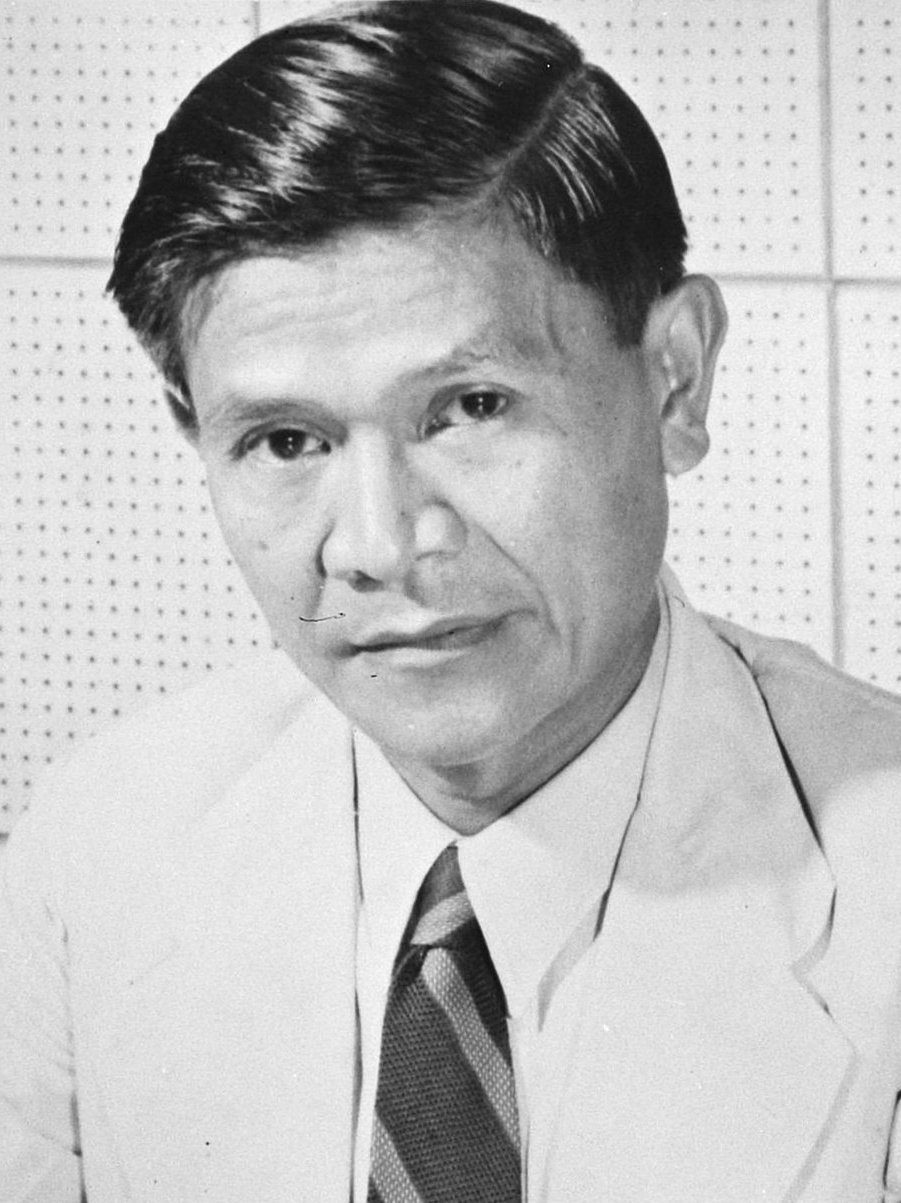
- Abdulkadir Widjojoatmodjo, December 1947

Government Commissioner for Administrative Affairs for the State of Pasundan
- In office July 1947 – October 1947
- Governor General: Hubertus Johannes van Mook
- Succeeded by: Hilman Djajadiningrat

Director General of General Negotiation Affairs of the Kingdom of the Netherlands with the Republic of Indonesia
- In office October 1947 – December 1949
- Governors General: Hubertus Johannes van Mook; Louis Beel; A.H.J Lovink

Personal details
- Born: 18 December 1904 Salatiga, Dutch East Indies
- Died: 24 December 1992 (aged 88) The Hague, Netherlands
- Education: Opleiding School Voor Inlandsche Ambtenaren; Leiden University
- Occupation: Civil servant, diplomat, military officer

Military service
- Allegiance: Dutch East Indies; Netherlands
- Branch/service: Royal Netherlands East Indies Army
- Years of service: 1942–1945
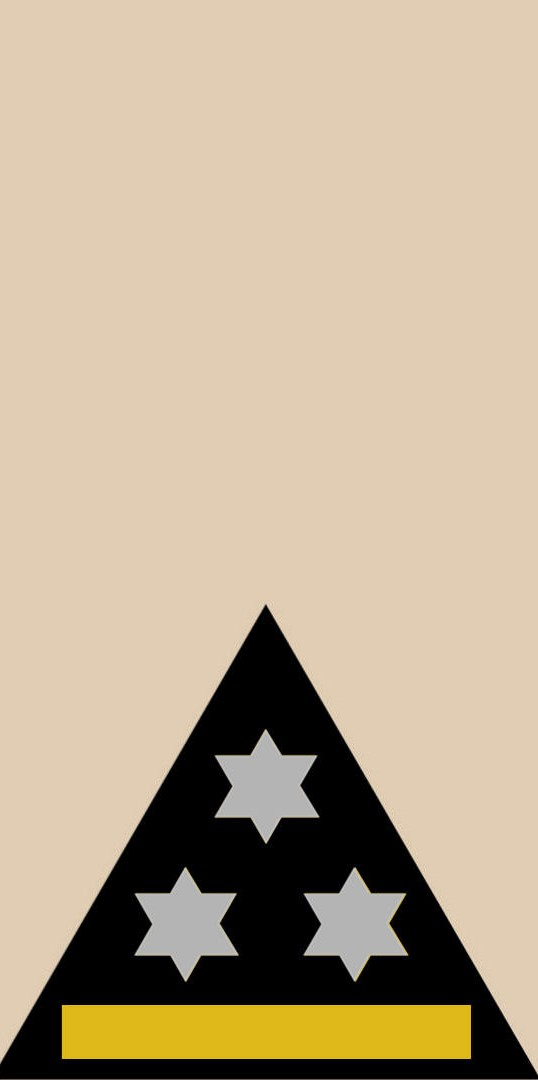
- Rank: Colonel
- Unit: Netherlands Indies Civil Administration

Raden Abdulkadir Widjojoatmodjo (18 December 1904 – 24 December 1992) was a military officer, diplomat, and high-ranking official of the Dutch East Indies.

== Early career ==
Abdulkadir was educated at a Dutch school and attended Indological training at Leiden University under Christiaan Snouck Hurgronje who recommended him to the Homegrown Council. There he worked as an administrator. In 1919 he became secretary of the Dutch embassy in Jeddah in the Kingdom of Hejaz. In 1932 he became deputy consul in Mecca, Saudi Arabia, and therefore the highest representative of the Netherlands. Just before the outbreak of World War II he was a senior official in New Guinea.

From March 1944 he was a consultant in the public service of Deputy Governor General Hubertus van Mook that the Dutch government from outside the Dutch East Indies tried to restore with the Netherlands Indies Civil Administration (NICA), from 1946 the Allied Military Administration Civil Affairs Branch (AMACAB) and after the departure of the British Department of Temporary Administration troops. He was temporarily the highest authority of the Dutch East Indies in Brisbane. Abdulkadir participated in the restoration of Dutch authority in the East Indies and was appointed a resident (as a colonel in the KNIL) from Maluku.

== Indonesian revolution ==
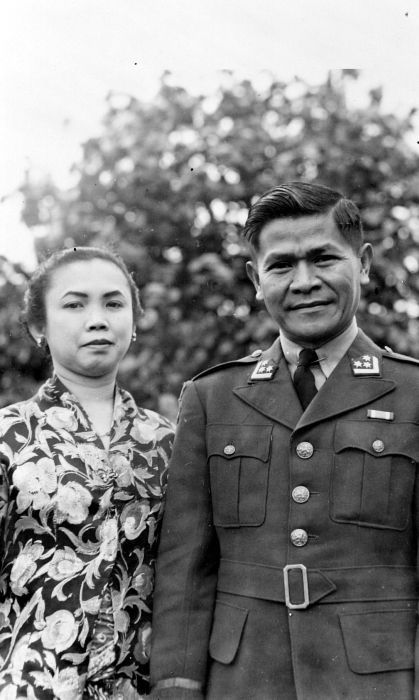
Abdulkadir Widjojoatmodjo with his wife, as second in command of the Netherlands Indies Civil Administration

Abdulkadir played an active role in the preparations for constitutional changes in 1946 as part of the Secretary of State for public affairs. At the end of 1947, he served as governor-general of the Dutch East Indies and was an envoy of the Dutch delegation during United Nations-led negotiations of the independence of Indonesia.

=== Renville Agreement ===
In the Renville Agreement, Abdulkadir was an envoy of the Dutch delegation taking place on 8 December 1947. He signed the agreement, representing the Netherlands.

=== Formation of the State of Pasundan ===
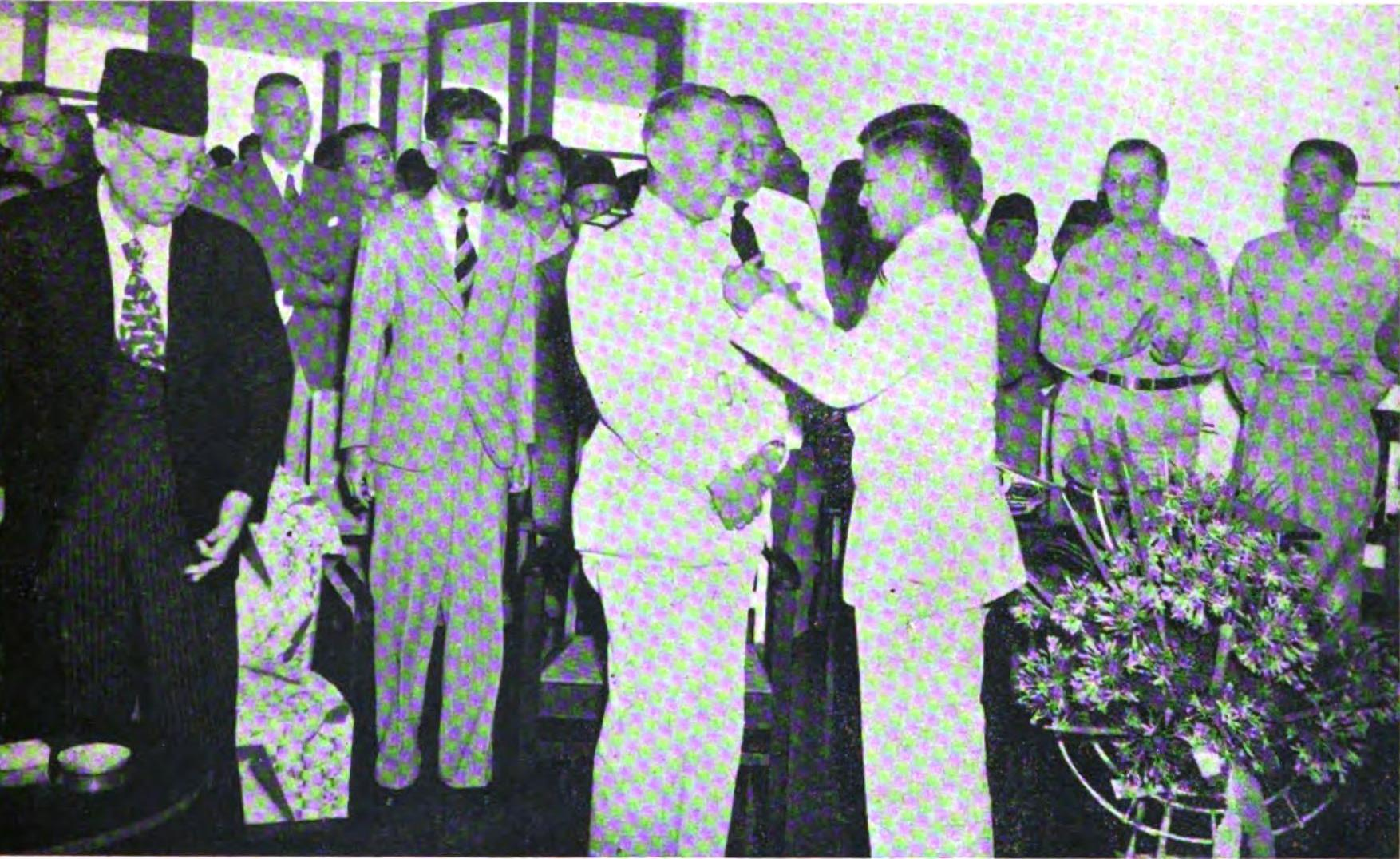
Abdulkadir bestowing an award to Hilman Djajadiningrat

Abdulkadir, who served as Recomba (governor) of West Java, took the initiative to hold the first conference of the State of Pasundan on 12–19 October 1947. He invited as a participant in the conference the former republican resident in Bogor R.A.A Hilman Djajadiningrat who was appointed as chairman.

== Post-war ==
Abdulkadir continued to live in Indonesia after its independence for 17 years. There, he was treated like a pariah for collaborating with the Dutch. Following his declined health, he emigrated to the Netherlands. He died in 1992 in The Hague and was later buried at the family grave site in Karanganyar.
