= Hubertus van Mook =

Dutch colonial governor (1894–1965)

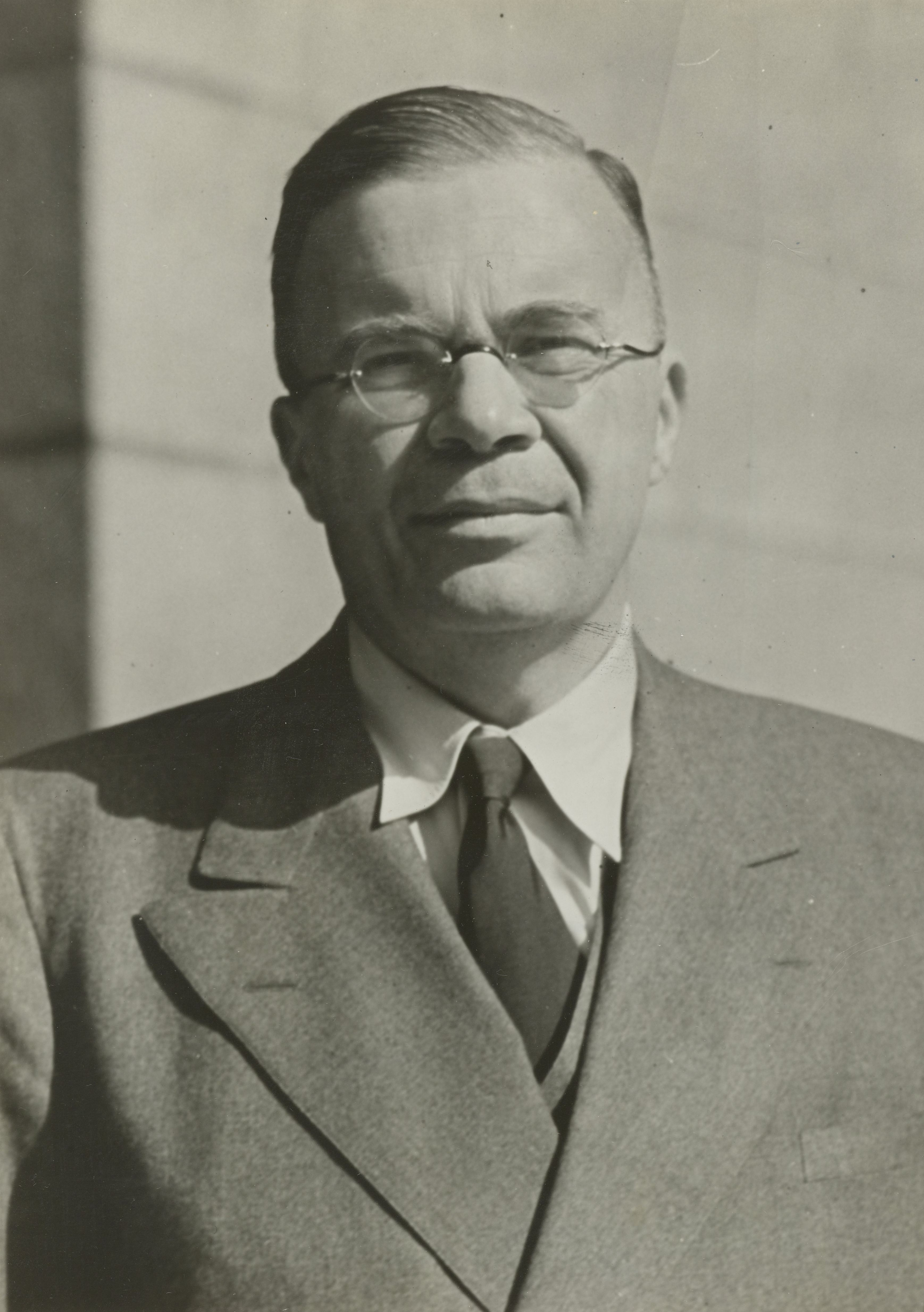
- Hubertus van Mook, c. 1940s

Governor-General of the Dutch East Indies
- Lieutenant
- In office 8 March 1942 – 15 October 1948; In exile until 1 October 1945
- Monarchs: Wilhelmina; Juliana
- Preceded by: Alidius Tjarda van Starkenborgh
- Succeeded by: Louis Beel (as High Commissioner)

Minister of Colonial Affairs
- In office 21 May 1942 – 23 February 1945
- Prime Minister: Pieter Sjoerds Gerbrandy
- Preceded by: Pieter Sjoerds Gerbrandy
- Succeeded by: Josef Schmutzer

Personal details
- Born: Hubertus Johannes van Mook; 30 May 1894 Semarang, Dutch East Indies
- Died: 10 May 1965 (aged 70) L'Isle-sur-la-Sorgue, France
- Education: Leiden University
- Occupation: Politician; diplomat; author

Hubertus Johannes "Huib" van Mook (30 May 1894 – 10 May 1965) was a Dutch administrator in the East Indies. During the Indonesian National Revolution, he served as the lieutenant governor-general of the Dutch East Indies from 1942 to 1948. Van Mook also had a son named Cornelius van Mook who studied marine engineering at the Massachusetts Institute of Technology. He also wrote about Java - and his work on Kota Gede is a good example of a colonial bureaucrat capable of examining and writing about local folklore.

== Biography ==
Hubertus van Mook was born in Semarang in Central Java on 30 May 1894. As with many Dutch and Indos (people of European and Indonesian heritage) growing up in the East Indies, he came to regard the colony, particularly Java, as his home. He studied Indology at Leiden University, and then returned to the Dutch East Indies. In 1931, he became a member of the Volksraad, the advisory body set up by the colonial administration. There he spoke in favour of greater autonomy for the Dutch East Indies and for equal treatment for different races. From 1937 to 1941 he was director of economic affairs. On 29 December 1941, a royal decree named Van Mook the successor to Governor-General of the Dutch East Indies Alidius Tjarda van Starkenborgh Stachouwer, and appointed him lieutenant governor-general. Immediately prior to the surrender of the East Indies to the Japanese on 8 March 1942, the Dutch East Indies government in exile near Brisbane, Australia gave Van Mook authority over those areas still unoccupied by the Japanese. However, two weeks later, he was relieved of his lieutenant-governorship and became minister of colonial affairs. On 14 September 1944, after he persuaded the Dutch government in exile to establish a provisional East Indies government, he was reappointed lieutenant governor-general. Due to his liberal inclinations and sympathies towards Indonesian nationalism, many conservative Dutch distrusted his policies and he was never given the full title of governor-general. Because of the weakened position of the Dutch due to the Nazi invasion and occupation, much of the task of retaking the East Indies following the Japanese surrender in August 1945 was carried out by Australian and British forces. While Australian forces succeeded in occupying the Outer Islands with minimal resistance, British forces in Java and Sumatra were challenged by a nascent Indonesian republic led by Sukarno and Hatta.

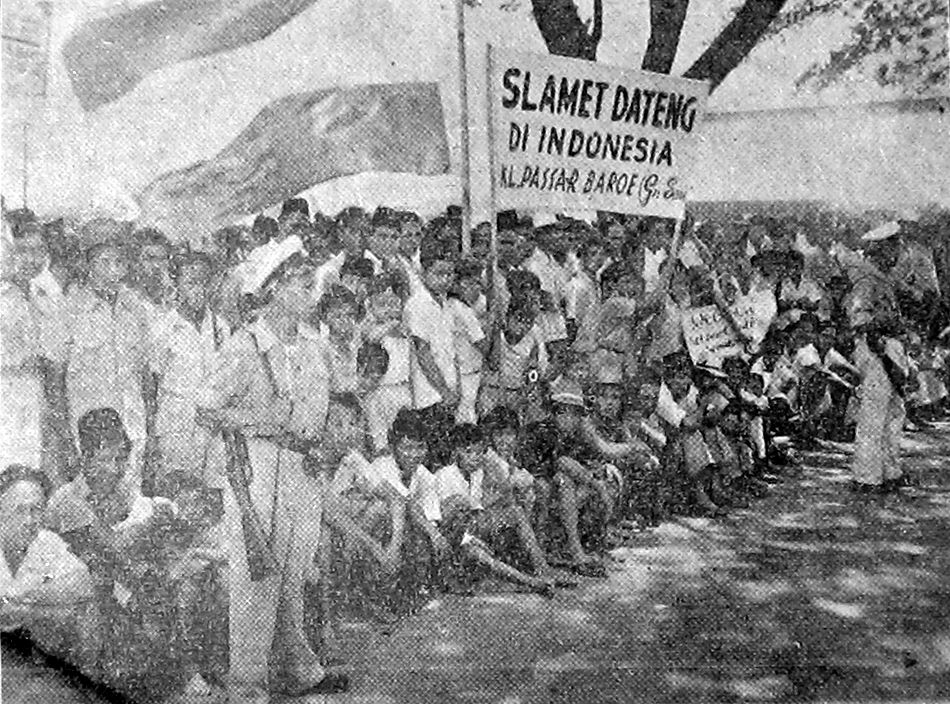
Indonesians awaiting Van Mook's return to the country

On 1 October 1945, Van Mook arrived back in Java along with elements of the Netherlands Indies Civil Administration. However, their presence generated much outrage from much of the Indonesian populace who were opposed to the restoration of Dutch colonial rule. With Dutch support being limited to Christian areas like Ambon and Manado, which were at that time (not before WWII) the chief sources of recruitment for the Royal Dutch East Indies Army., even though the majority of Royal Dutch East Indies Army soldiers had always been Javanese Muslims, the largest ethnic group in the colony. Republican forces had taken control of Manado by February 1946, before being subdued by allied forces, and many Christian Manado and Ambonesse supported the Republic, including chief representative for the UN, Lambertus Nicodemus Palar, Leimena, Alexander Andries Maramis. On the other hand, many leading Dutch supporters were from Muslim areas, including Sultan Hamid II, Andi Azis, R. Abdulkadir Wijoyoatmojo (later chief Dutch negotiator in the talks leading to the Renville Agreement). While van Mook planned to grant independence to Indonesia, he advocated a federal Republic of the United States of Indonesia with strong political and economic ties to the Netherlands. He regarded Sukarno's republic as economically inept and unable to ward off the Indonesian Chinese, Indonesian Indians, and the rising Indonesian Communist Party, and began cultivating links with Indonesian leaders outside Java, particularly in West Java and eastern Indonesia. He organised a number of conferences aimed at offsetting the influence of the republic.

The above factors and violations of the Linggadjati Agreement prompted the East Indies government to launch a police action in mid-1947, which was known as Operation Product. The KNIL and Royal Netherlands Army occupied large areas of Java and Sumatra, with the Republican army offering only weak resistance. However, the Dutch were held back from full conquest of the Republic by pressure from the UN Security Council and the United States, which called for a ceasefire. This led to the announcement of a ceasefire in January 1948 followed by a formal armistice. As a consequence, a conflict previously considered to be an internal Dutch affair now took on an international dimension.

The Renville Agreement, as the armistice was called, stipulated the withdrawal of Indonesian forces from Dutch-occupied territory and the establishment of a ceasefire boundary known as the Van Mook Line. Because of problems caused by the differing interests of regional leaders and opposition from elements of the Dutch military and government, in 1948 Van Mook resigned. Meanwhile, some time after the ceasefire, the Indonesian military secretly returned and began guerrilla operations against the Dutch. This led to a second major Dutch police action known as Operation Kraai in December 1948.

Van Mook subsequently broke links with both Indonesia and his home country, and took a job with the United Nations. However, not long after this, he died in France.

== Decorations ==
Honours
Ribbon bar	Honour	Country	Date	Comment
	Knight Grand Cross of the Order of Orange-Nassau	Netherlands	29 August 1947	Elevated from Commander
	Knight of the Order of the Netherlands Lion	Netherlands		
	Order of the Jade 3rd class	Republic of China	22 July 1939	
	Grand Cordon of the Order of the Liberator	Venezuela	22 August 1944	

== Trivia ==
- Mr. Van Mook was pictured on the front of Time Magazine's edition of August 18, 1941, the fourth cover featuring a Dutch person. An article was dedicated to him in Time's edition of June 16, 1941, lauding his stance towards Japan prior to the start of the Pacific War.

Political offices
Preceded by Alidius Tjarda van Starkenborgh	Governor-General of the Dutch East Indies (lieutenant); 1942–1948	Succeeded by Louis Beel as High Commissioner
Preceded by Pieter Sjoerds Gerbrandy	Minister of Colonial Affairs; 1942–1945	Succeeded by Josef Schmutzer
