= Boronia Park =

Protected area in New South Wales, Australia

Boronia Park Reserve
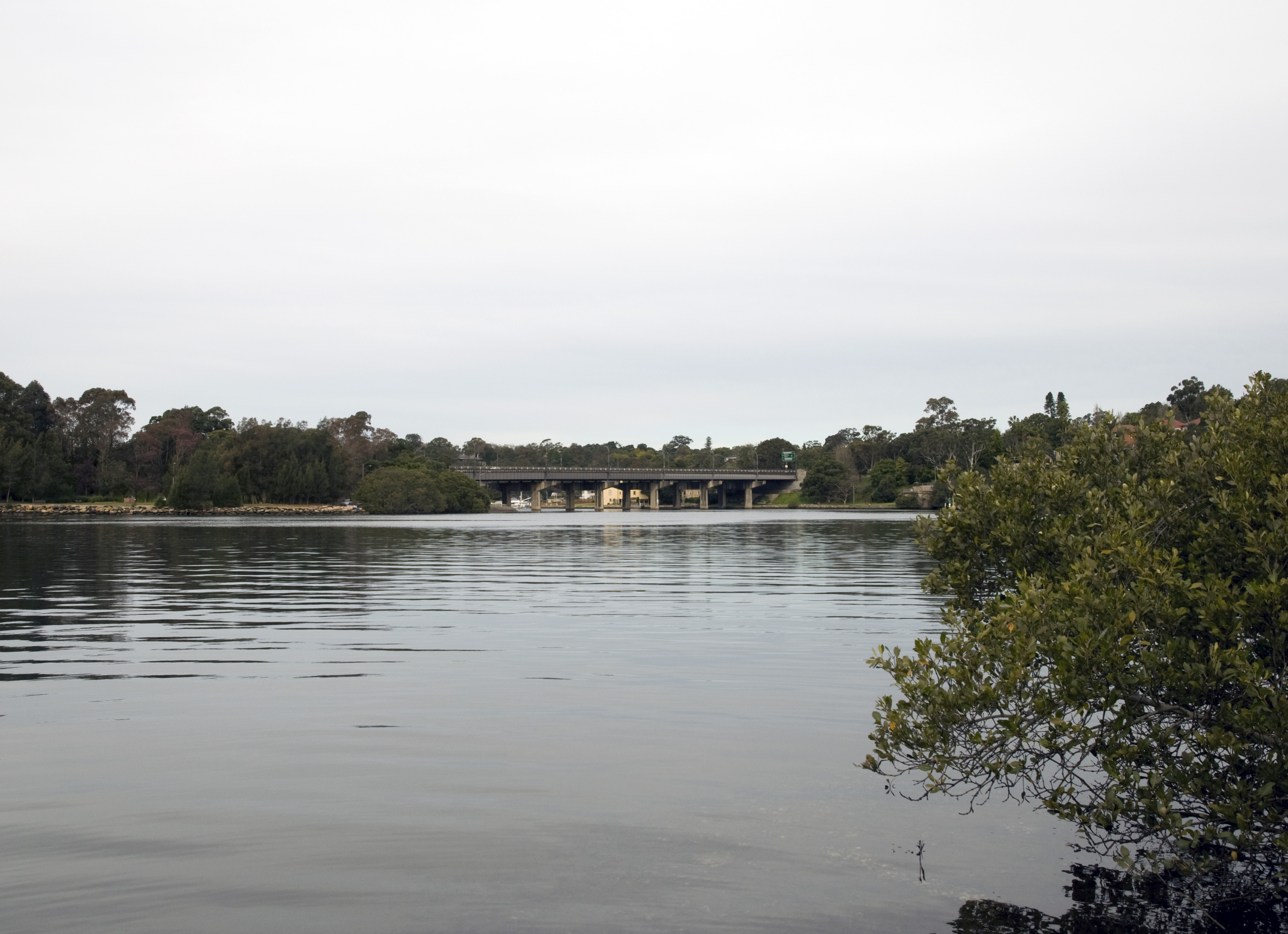
- Fig Tree Bridge, Linley Point from Boronia Park

- Location within New South Wales
- Location: New South Wales
- Nearest city: Hunters Hill
- Coordinates: 33°49′30″S 151°8′30″E
- Area: 0.3 km^{2} (0.12 sq mi)
- Governing body: Hunter's Hill Council

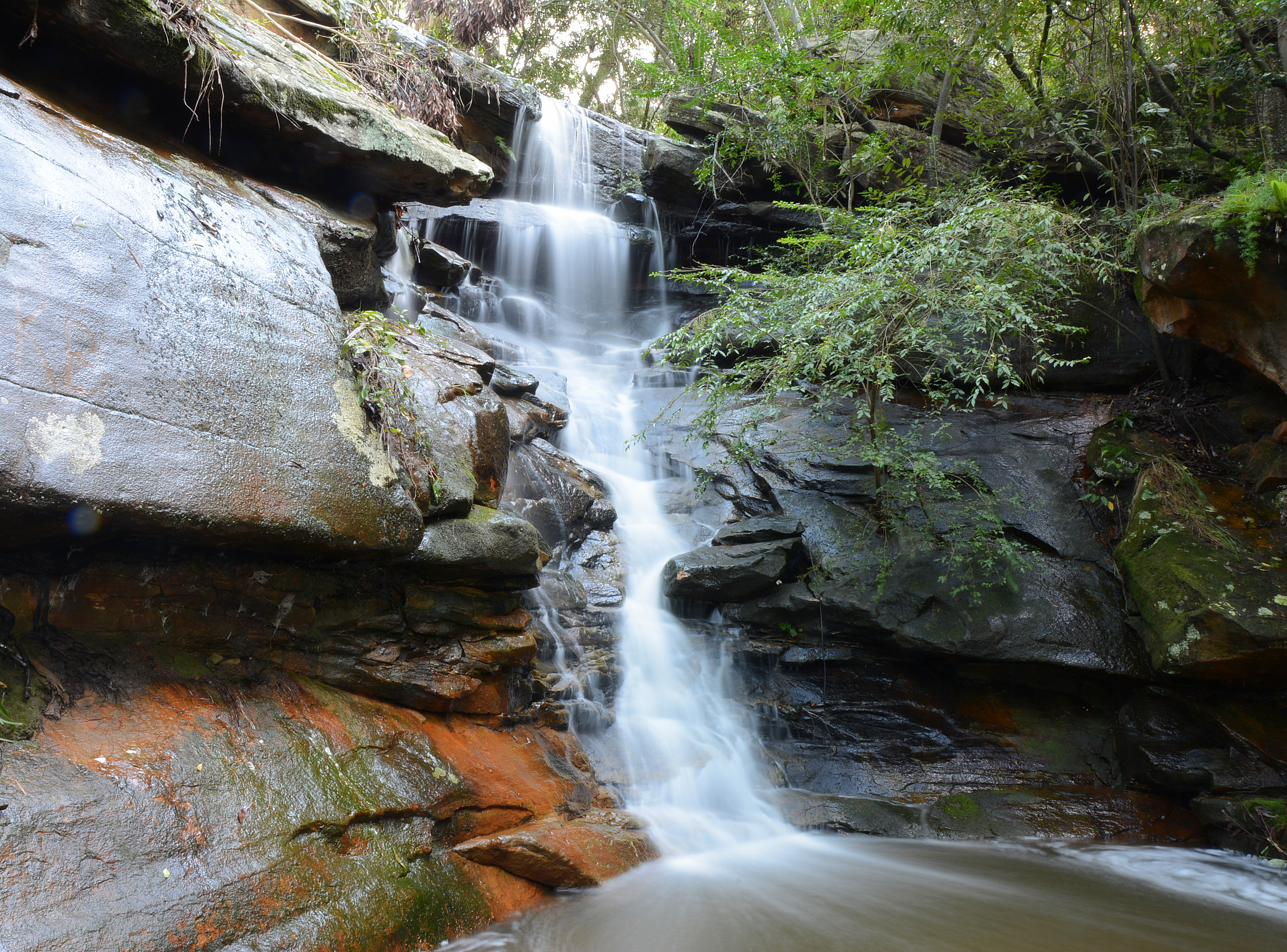
Tipperary Falls

The Boronia Park, or the Boronia Park Reserve, is a waterfront parkland and nature reserve wholly within the suburb of Hunters Hill, in the Municipality of Hunter's Hill, New South Wales, Australia. The park dates back to pre-colonial New South Wales, with original and widely diverse flora and fauna:

...Boronia Park is the best place to gain an idea of Hunter's Hill's pre-European landscape, as it has the largest intact stretch of bushland. Its sandstone slopes carry characteristic open-forest of Eucalyptus piperita, Eucalyptus gummifera and Angophora costata, with a great variety of understorey shrubs and small trees. Towards the top of the slope is an area of Kunzea ambigua shrubland, while Blackbutt, Eucalyptus pilularia grow on the more sheltered aspects, and a small creek tumbles down a steep waterfall to form a pool beside Grey Mangroves along the river's edge...the Turpentine-Ironbark forest's only remnant in Hunters Hill today is a small stand of Syncarpia glomulifera, with some understorey shrubs, near the entrance to Boronia Park...

— Taken for Granted - the Bushland of Sydney and its Suburbs. 1995.

== Etymology ==
The park was named after the Boronia ledifolia which is all but locally extinct, probably due to the introduction of rabbits in the 19th century.

== Geography ==
The Boronia Park is bordered in Hunters Hill by Park Road to the west, High Street to the north, Ryde Road to the south and the Lane Cove River and Boronia Avenue to the east. Boronia Park Reserve contains Brickmakers Creek where the water flows over Tipperary Falls, a 10-metre (33 ft) high waterfall on a Hawkesbury sandstone escarpment before entering the Lane Cove River through a tidal pool lined with saltmarsh, mangrove, Avicienna marina and Casuarina glauca.

== Public use and amenities ==
Three ovals are available for playing various sports and it is also the home of the Hunters Hill Rugby Union Football Club and Ryde Hunters Hill Pirates Cricket Club. The main oval has one grandstand which contains several rows of seats.

The Boronia Park Public School, named after the parkland and reserve, is located on the east side of Pittwater Road (between Pittwater Road and Earl Street), wholly within the suburb of Hunters Hill. It provides schooling for around 650 pupils of the local area. It prides itself in its beautiful grounds, much of which is shaded by leafy trees which are characteristic of the area.

Nearby is the Gladesville-Boronia Park Uniting Church.

The Great North Walk passes through Boronia Park just downstream of Tipperary Falls.

== See also ==
- Protected areas of New South Wales
