= Hunters Hill =

- Suburb
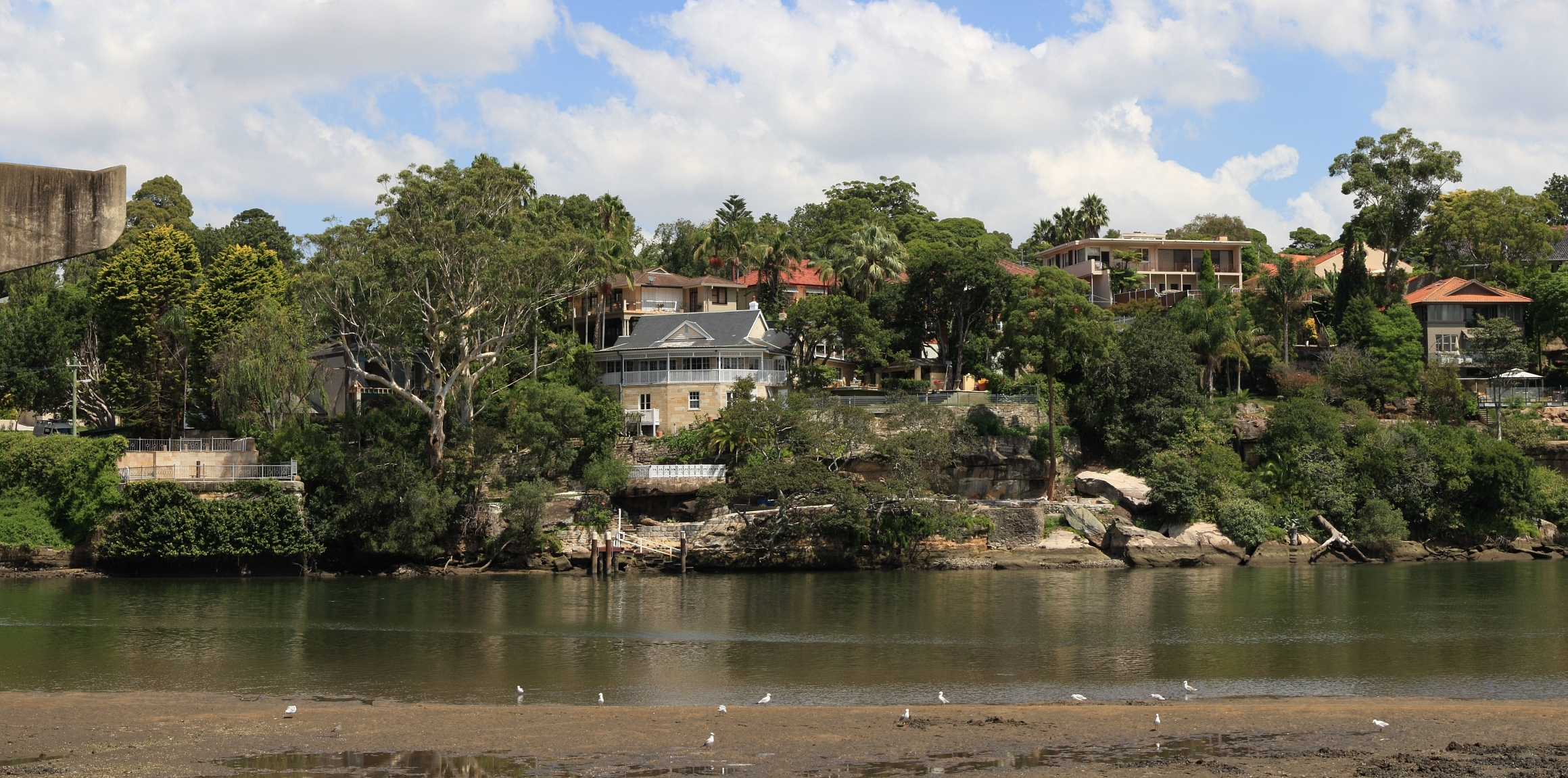
- Hunters Hill, New South Wales

- Interactive map of Hunters Hill
- Country: Australia
- State: New South Wales
- City: Sydney
- LGA: Municipality of Hunter's Hill
- Location: 9 km (5.6 mi) NW of Sydney CBD
- Established: 1861

Government
  - State electorate: Lane Cove
  - Federal division: Bennelong

Area
  - Total: 5.75 km^{2} (2.22 sq mi)

Population
  - Total: 9,014 (2021 census)
  - Density: 1,567.7/km^{2} (4,060/sq mi)
- Postcode: 2110
Suburbs around Hunters Hill
East Ryde	Linley Point	Longueville
Gladesville	Hunters Hill	Woolwich
Huntleys Cove	Huntleys Point	Drummoyne

Hunters Hill is a suburb of Northern Sydney, in the state of New South Wales, Australia. Hunters Hill is located 9 kilometres (5.6 mi) north-west of the Sydney central business district and is the administrative centre for the local government area of the Municipality of Hunter's Hill.

Hunters Hill is situated on a small peninsula that separates the Lane Cove and Parramatta Rivers. It can be reached by bus or by ferry.

Hunters Hill falls within the postcode "2110", which consistently ranks among the top 10 richest postcodes in Australia based on average taxable income.

== History ==
The area's Aboriginal name is Mookaboola or Moocooboola, which means 'meeting of waters'.

Hunters Hill was named after John Hunter, the second Governor of New South Wales, who was in office between 1795 and 1800.

The area that is now Hunters Hill was settled in 1835. One of the earliest settlers was Mary Reibey, the first female retailer in Sydney. She built a cottage – later known as Fig Tree House – on land that fronted the Lane Cove River; Reiby Street is named after her. During the 1840s, bushrangers and convicts who had escaped from the penal settlement on Cockatoo Island would take refuge in Hunters Hill.

Many of the suburb's early houses were built from the local sandstone. A number were built by Frenchman Didier Numa Joubert (1816–1881), who bought 81 hectares (200 acres) of land from Mary Reiby from 1847 and used seventy stonemasons from Italy to construct solid artistic houses. Hunters Hill was proclaimed as a municipality on 5 January 1861. The first Gladesville Bridge constructed in 1881 linked the area to Drummoyne and the southern side of the Parramatta River.

In the early 20th century, there was an industrial area in Hunters Hill. One of the industries was a radium and uranium refinery operating from 1911 to 1915. The concentrated ore was transported over 1,200 kilometres (750 mi) from Radium Hill in South Australia, 100 kilometres (62 mi) west of Broken Hill. At the time, uranium was considered a byproduct, but very small quantities of radium (which had been discovered in 1898) were very valuable. The refinery could produce about 5 milligrams (0.077 gr) of radium bromide from 1,016 kilograms (1 long ton) of ore, worth £20, equivalent to A$2,745 in 2022, per milligram in 1912. The area is now residential, Nelson Parade, and demands to remove it saw a plan developed to transport it to an old quarry area besides Badgerys Creek that was licensed to receive low level radioactive waste; however all such planning ceased as Badgerys Creek International Airport was decided upon to proceed.

In 2021, following extensive community consultation and research, Hunters Hill Council received planning approval to remediate the site of the Old Radium Hill processing plant and dispose of the contaminated material at a licensed facility in the United States of America.

This approach had strong community support and would resolve a long-standing issue that the private sector created.

Remediation works began in September 2021. In the later stages of the project the waste material from the site was taken to a facility in Western Australia after it was granted a license to operate in 2023. The excavation and removal of the waste material was completed in August 2024.

The Australian Nuclear Science and Technology Organisation supervised the excavation and packing of the contaminated material into sealed bags and containers before it was transported for disposal.

In 2003 Where 2 Technologies developed a computer mapping application, later Google Maps, in a bedroom in Hunters Hill.

== Heritage listings ==
Hunters Hill has a number of heritage-listed sites, including:

- 38–40 Alexandra Street: Vienna, Hunters Hill
- 12 Crescent Street: Milthorpe, Hunters Hill
- 14 Crescent Street: Hestock
- Ferry Street: The Garibaldi
- Nelson Parade: Kellys Bush Park
- 46 Ryde Road: Marika, Hunters Hill
- 2 Yerton Avenue: The Chalet

In addition, the following Hunter's HIll buildings are heritage-listed:

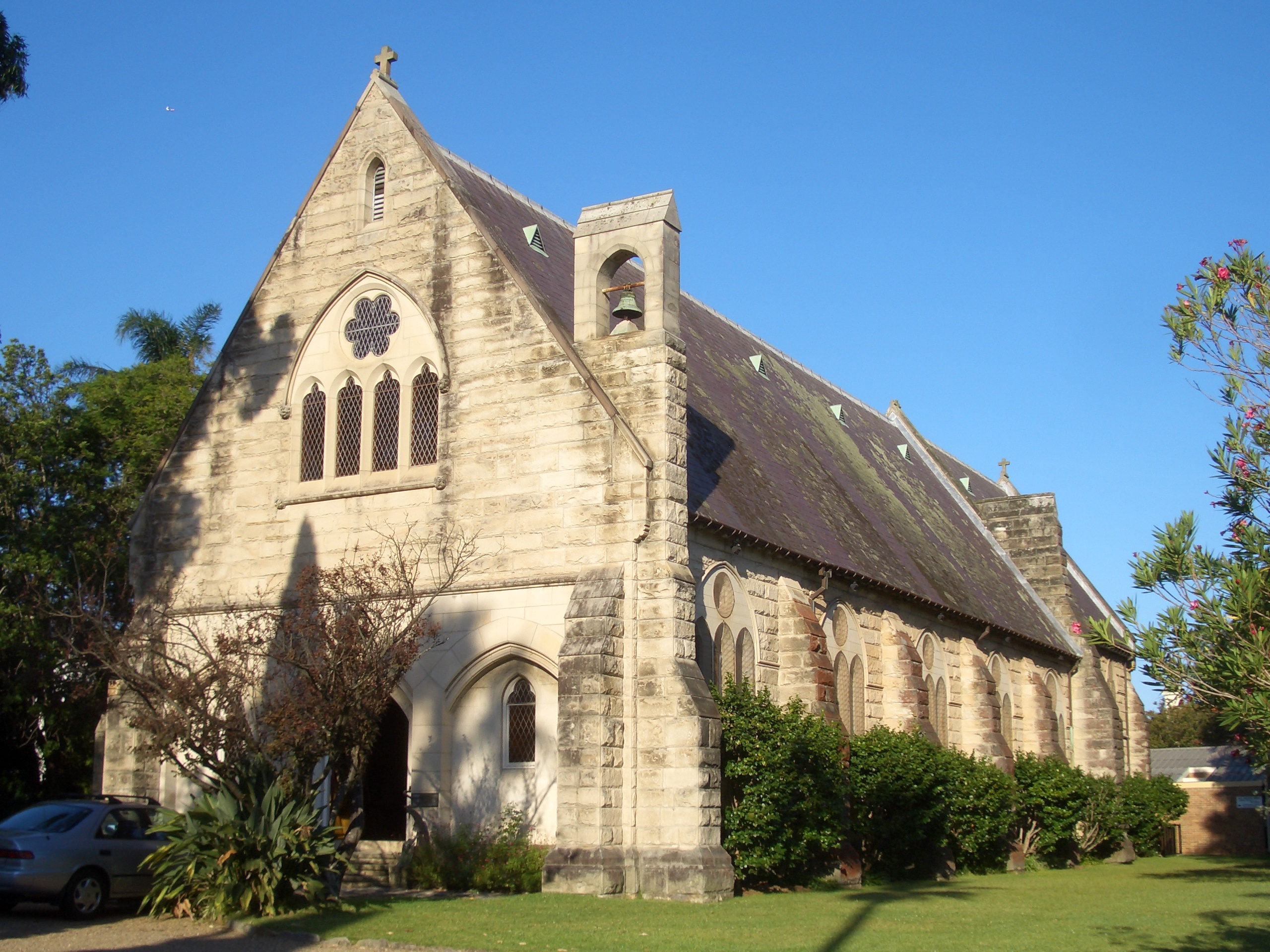
All Saints Anglican Church.

Historic home in Hunters Hill

- Public School including Eulbertie, Alexandra Street
- Post Office, Alexandra Street
- Town Hall, Alexandra Street
- St Ives, Crescent Street
- Anglican Church of All Saints, corner Ferry and Ambrose Streets
- Kyarra, Madeline Street
- Fig Tree House, Reiby Road
- Clifton, Woolwich Road
- Waiwera, Woolwich Road
- St Claire, Wybalena Road
- Woolwich Dock, Franki Avenue, Woolwich

=== Houses ===
Hunters Hill has an area of 5.75 square kilometres (2.22 sq mi) including some 650,000 square metres (7,000,000 sq ft) of parks and reserves. Developments are mostly residential.

Hunters Hill has a number of heritage-listed buildings and is positioned near the confluence of the Lane Cove and Parramatta Rivers, as well as the headwaters of Sydney Harbour, which provides river and harbour views. Previously having a number of residents of French extraction, it was known as the "French Village" and shares a friendship with a sister city near Paris, Le Vésinet.

== Population ==
=== Demographics ===
In the 2021 census of Population and Housing, the population of Hunters Hill stood at 9,014 people. 69.0% of people were born in Australia. The most common countries of birth were England 3.9%, China 3.1%, New Zealand 1.3%, South Africa 1.1% and Italy 1.1%. The most common ancestries were English 29.6%, Australian 25.9%, Irish 14.0%, Chinese 9.1% and Scottish 8.8%. 74.2% of people only spoke English at home. Other languages spoken at home included Mandarin 3.2%, Cantonese 2.0%, Greek 2.0%, Italian 1.6% and Arabic 1.2%. The top responses for religious affiliation were Catholic 35.5%, No Religion 28.0% and Anglican 11.0%.

The median household weekly income was high at $3,413. Monthly mortgage payments were also high, with a median of $4,333 compared with the national figure of $1,863. According to the Australian Taxation Office statistics, the postcode of 2110 (Hunters Hill & Woolwich) had an average taxable income of $215,456 making it the 9th wealthiest suburb in Australia.

=== Notable residents ===
- Halse Rogers Arnott, chairman of Arnott's
- Henry Budden, architect
- Cate Blanchett, actress; and spouse, Andrew Upton, writer
- Stanley Gibbs, shipping clerk and George Cross recipient
- Delta Goodrem, singer and actress
- Kristina Keneally, politician
- Ben Keneally, politician
- Brian McFadden, singer
- Eddie Obeid, a former Labor politician
- Ann Sanders, journalist
- Gil Wahlquist, journalist and winemaker
- Josh Hazlewood, cricketer
- Lang Walker, property developer

== Politics ==
State elections
Liberal	62.7%
Labor	16.9%
Greens	12.4%
Democrats	4.7%
Christian Democrats	2.0%
Unity Party	1.3%

Federal elections
Liberal	67.27%
Labor	24.02%
Greens	7.16%
Liberal Democrats	2.17%
Independent	0.44%
Family First	0.39%
Citizens Electoral Council	0.28%
Christian Democrats	0.11%

Hunters Hill has been part of the federal Division of Bennelong since 2024. Prior to that, Hunters Hill was in the federal electoral division of North Sydney. The former Treasurer of Australia Joe Hockey, held this seat from the 1996 federal election to 2015.

For NSW state elections, Hunters Hill is in the Electoral district of Lane Cove. As of 2003 this seat is held by Liberal MP Anthony Roberts, who was last re-elected in the 2007 state election.

== Transport ==
Several bus routes run through Hunters Hill, consisting of:

- 252: North Sydney to Gladesville via Pacific Highway
- 505: Town Hall Station to Woolwich (peak only)
- 506: The Domain to Macquarie University via East Ryde
- 530: Burwood to Chatswood
- 536: Gladesville to Chatswood (peak only)
- 538: Gladesville to Woolwich

The closest ferry wharves to Hunters Hill are Valentia Street Wharf, Woolwich and Huntleys Point. Huntleys Point provides access to the Parramatta River ferry services which run between Circular Quay and Parramatta while Woolwich provides access to the Cockatoo Island ferry services which run between Circular Quay and Cockatoo Island.

== Commercial areas ==
Hunters Hill has a few commercial areas. A group of shops is located on the corner of Alexandra and Ferry Streets, with others scattered further along these streets and on Woolwich Road.

The major commercial area is located around the intersection of Ryde Road and Gladesville Road, near the Burns Bay Road overpass and the Hunters Hill Hotel. It was re-developed in 2013.

== Schools ==
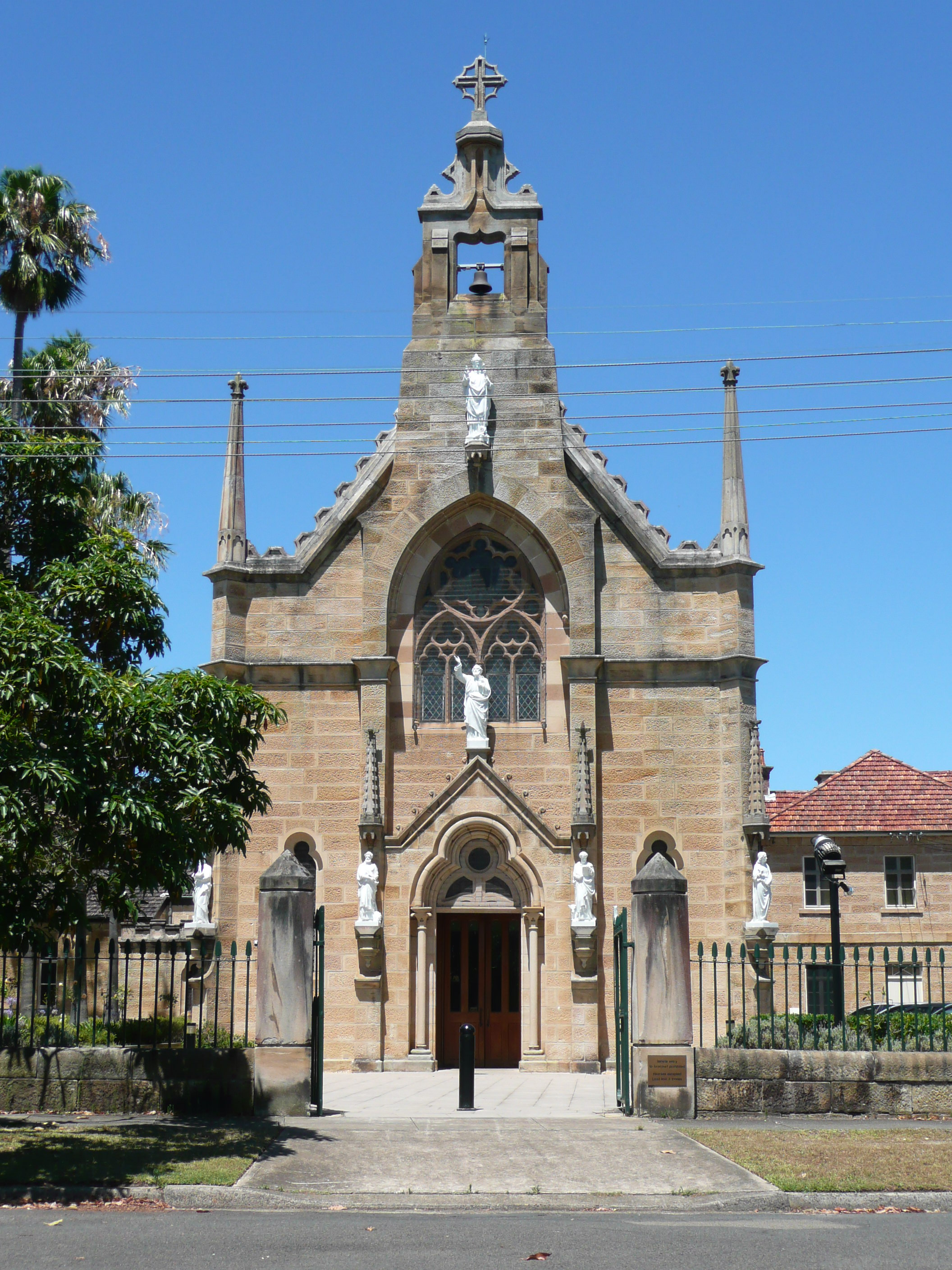
Church of the Holy Name of Mary

Hunters Hill is the site of the AAGPS Catholic boys' secondary school, St Joseph's College.. It is also home to Hunters Hill High School, Boronia Park Public School, Hunters Hill Primary School and Villa Maria Primary School.

== Churches ==
There are two Catholic churches, Villa Maria Church in Mary Street and St Peter Chanel in the east of the suburb. Villa Maria is also the headquarters of the Marist Fathers in Australia; from the 1860s, it was the centre of their extensive missionary work in the Pacific. St Joseph's College includes a large chapel. The Catholic Church is associated with St Anne's Nursing Home, run by the Sisters of St Joseph.

Other churches are St Mark's and All Saints Anglican Churches and Hunters Hill Congregational Church.

== Sport ==
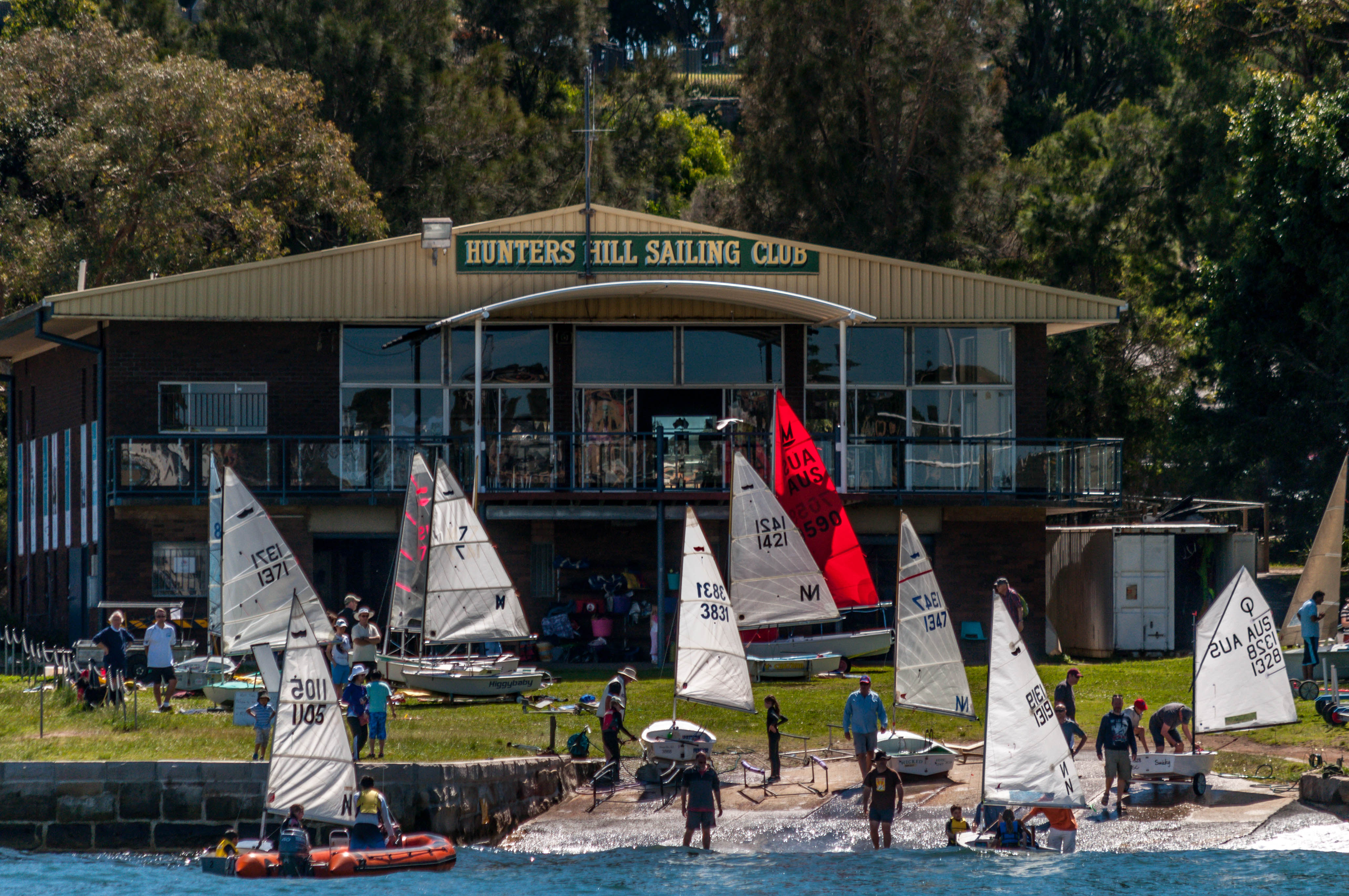
Hunters Hill Sailing Club on Parramatta River

Hunters Hill Tennis Club is one of the oldest sporting clubs in Australia. Early history of the club is obscure and no records are available showing the origins of the club, however the Club existed in the 1860s making it one of the oldest operating tennis clubs in Sydney. Early courts were situated in Passy Avenue, Hunters Hill. The first authentic record of the 'Hunters Hill Lawn Tennis Club' is a copy of the 1894 rules, stating the club was limited to 36 playing members, preference given to residents of Hunters Hill and club colours of Red, Green and Silver. Banjo Patterson is in newspaper records of having played at the club in the 1890s. It has had as members State and Interstate Champions, and an Australian entrant at the 1924 Wimbledon Championship, Alan Watt, who reached the fourth round of competition. The club has 5 lawn courts, and is one of the few remaining lawn court clubs in Sydney.

Hunters Hill Rugby Union Football Club was established in 1892 and competes in the New South Wales Suburban Rugby Union. It has won the Kentwell Cup 8 times and 1st Division club championship 5 times. The second most distinguished club in Subbies, it recently won the Stockdale Cup and Robertson Cup in 2010. The Robertson Cup was named after former Suburban Chairman (1978–80), Brian Robertson, this cup was first won by Port Hacking. After not being contested between 1988 and 1993, the Robertson Cup was revived to become the Colts trophy for second division. The Farrant Cup was named after life member Don Farrant, a long-time supporter of sub-district rugby, Hunters Hill club stalwart Don Farrant presented the Farrant Cup to the MSDRU in 1974. Initially included in an expanded fourth division, it became the award for the Division Three second grade premiership in 1995. Hunters Hill Rugby Union Football Club is a club that caters for all ages and level of ability, and plays matches at Boronia Park from March through to August.

== Landmarks ==
There is a private hospital in Alexandra Street and in High Street, a Jewish nursing home and synagogue named the Sir Moses Montefiore Home. The historic Hunters Hill Town Hall is located in Alexandra Street, close to the historic post office.

The Great North Walk, a walking trail from Sydney to Newcastle, passes through Boronia Park, a large waterfront parkland reserve which contains Aboriginal drawings thought to date back to before the start of the colony.

== Gallery ==
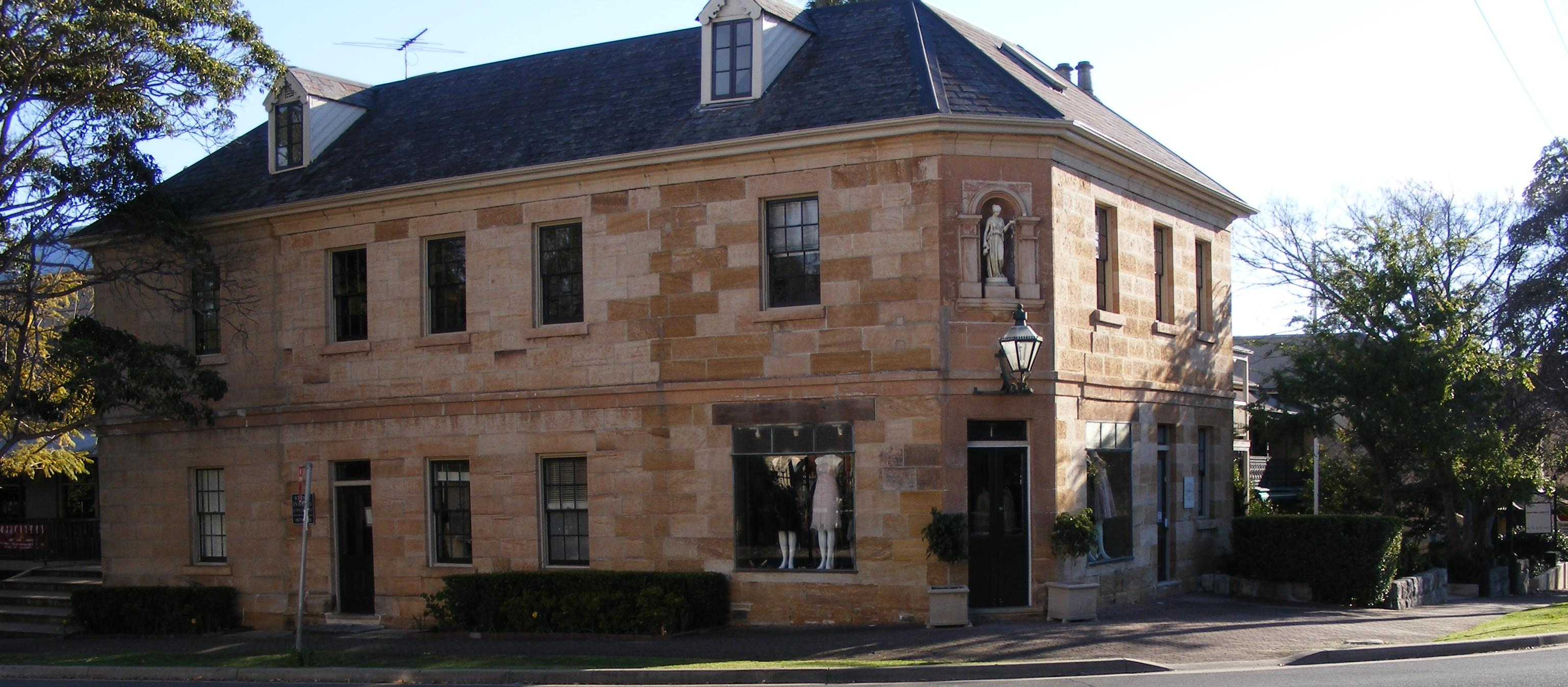
Former Garibaldi Inn, corner of Alexandra and Ferry Street

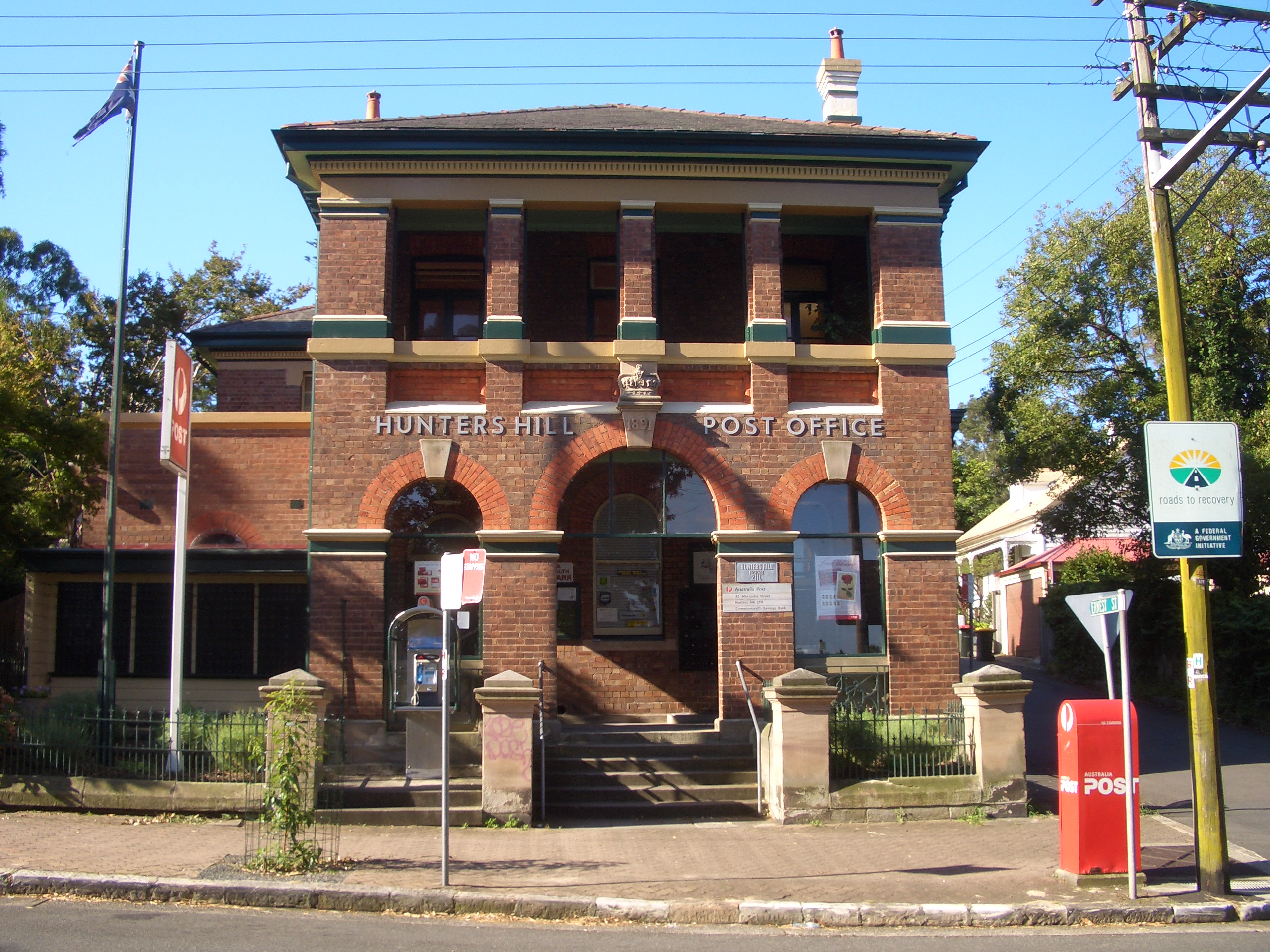
Hunters Hill Post Office

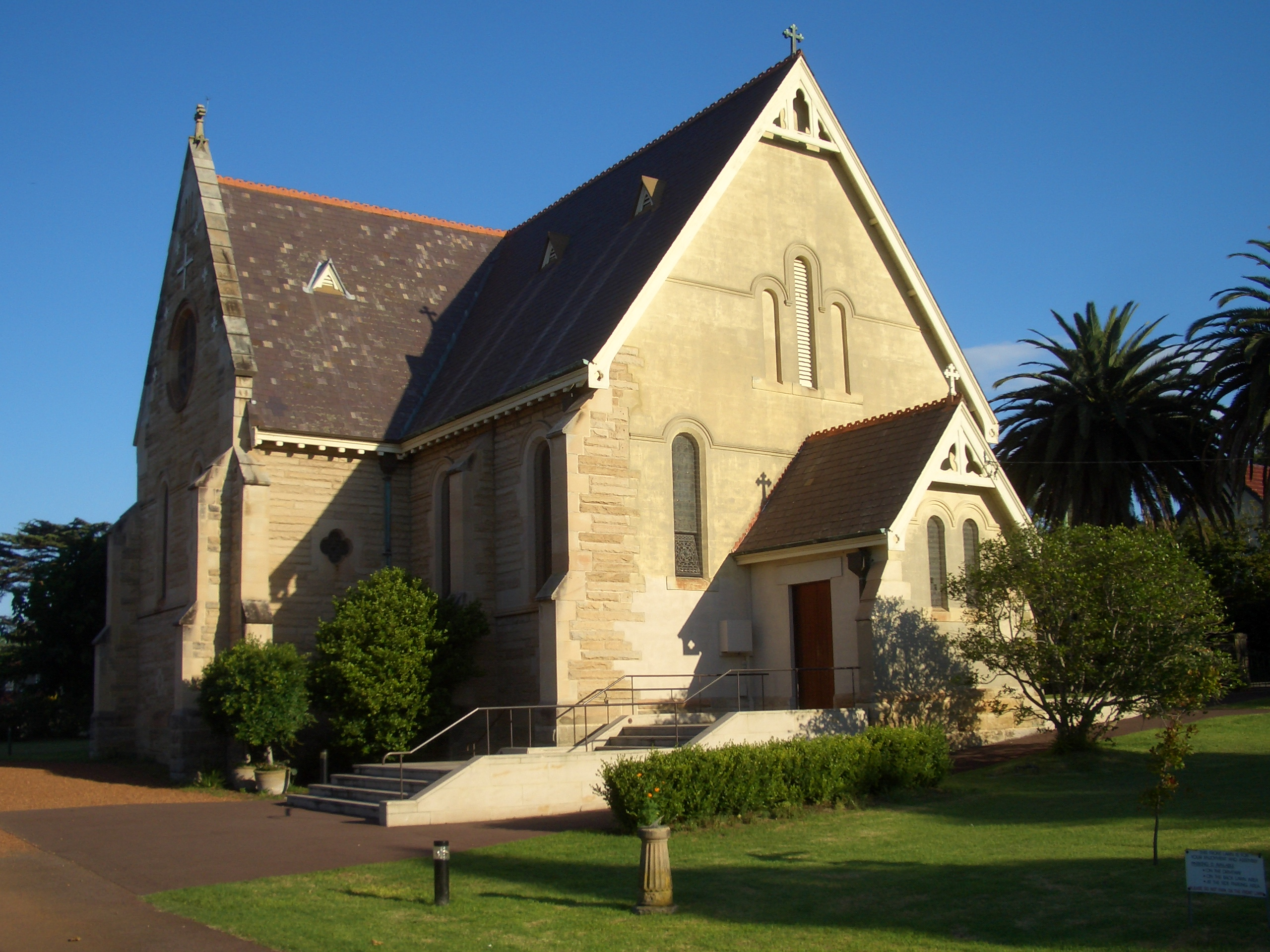
St Peter Chanel Catholic Church

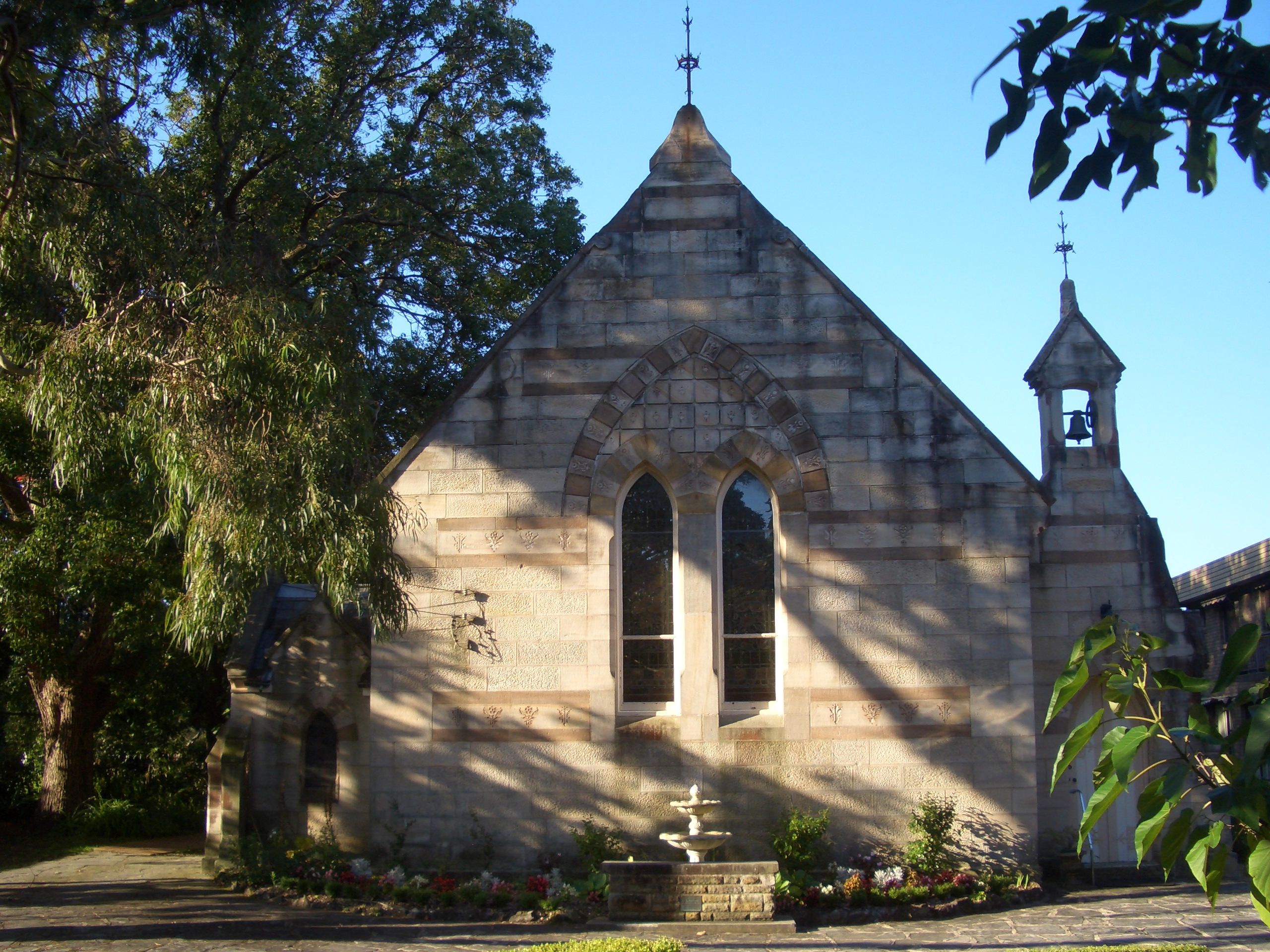
Congregational Community Church

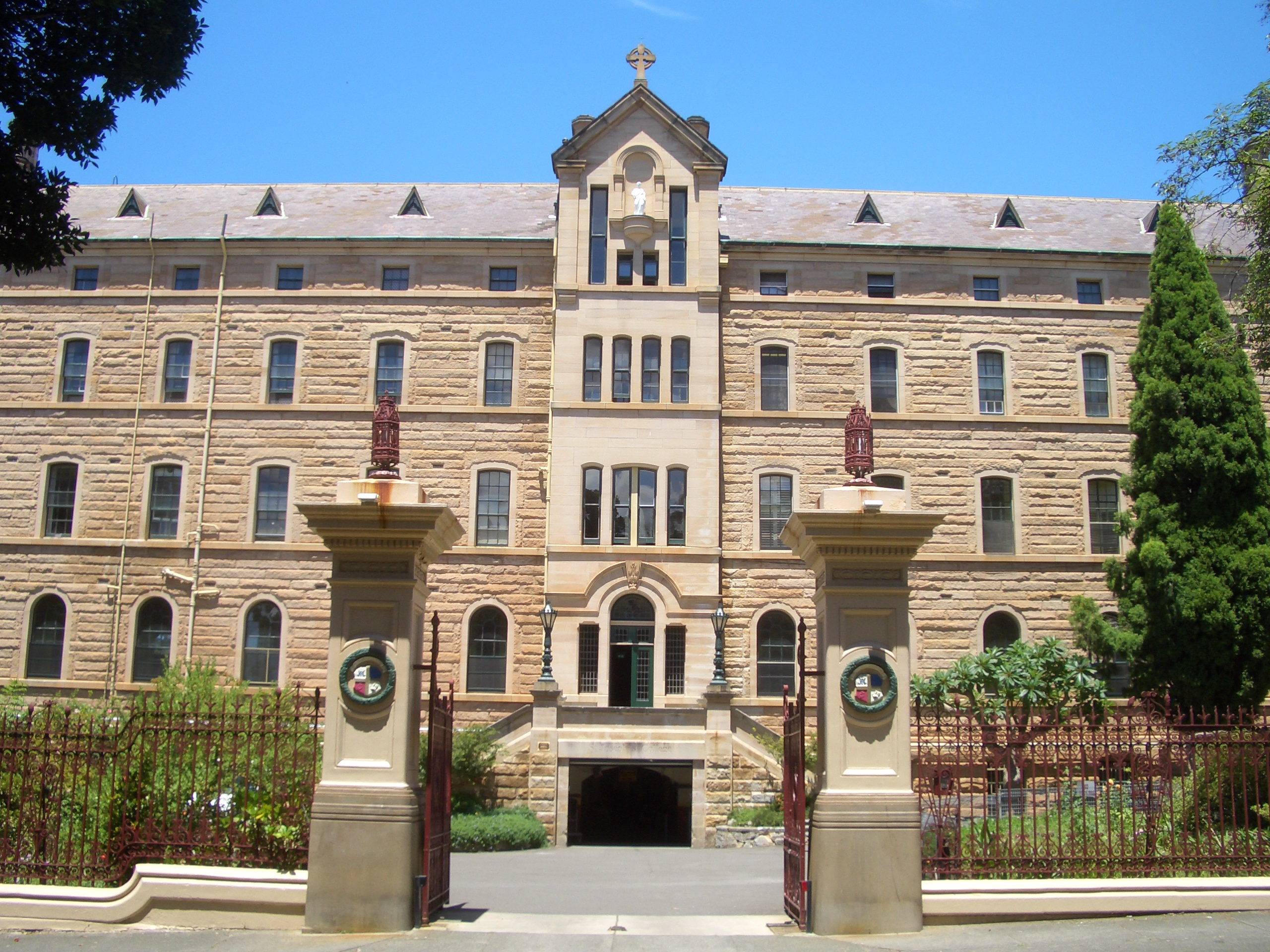
St Joseph's College

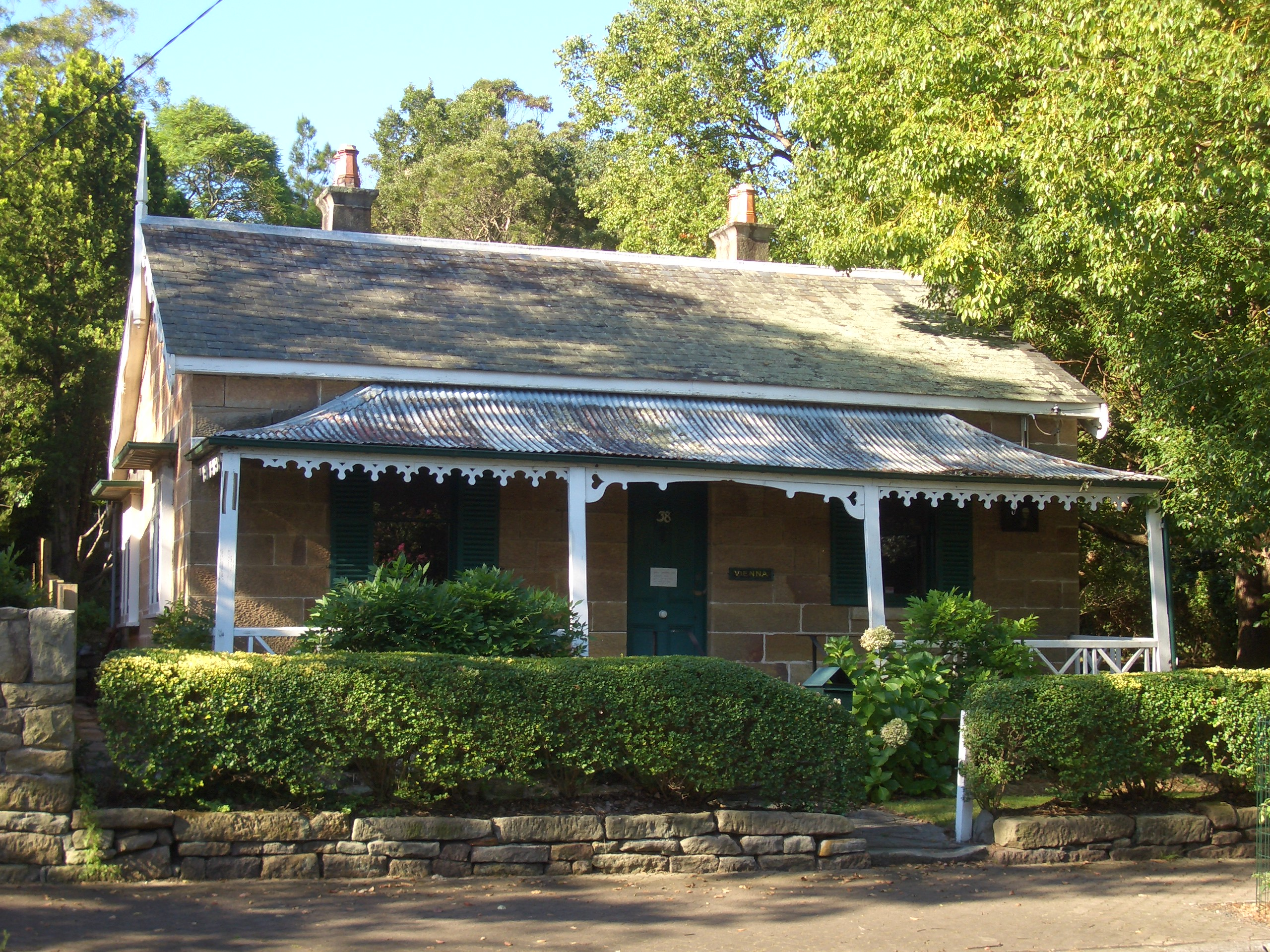
Vienna, a heritage-listed worker's cottage

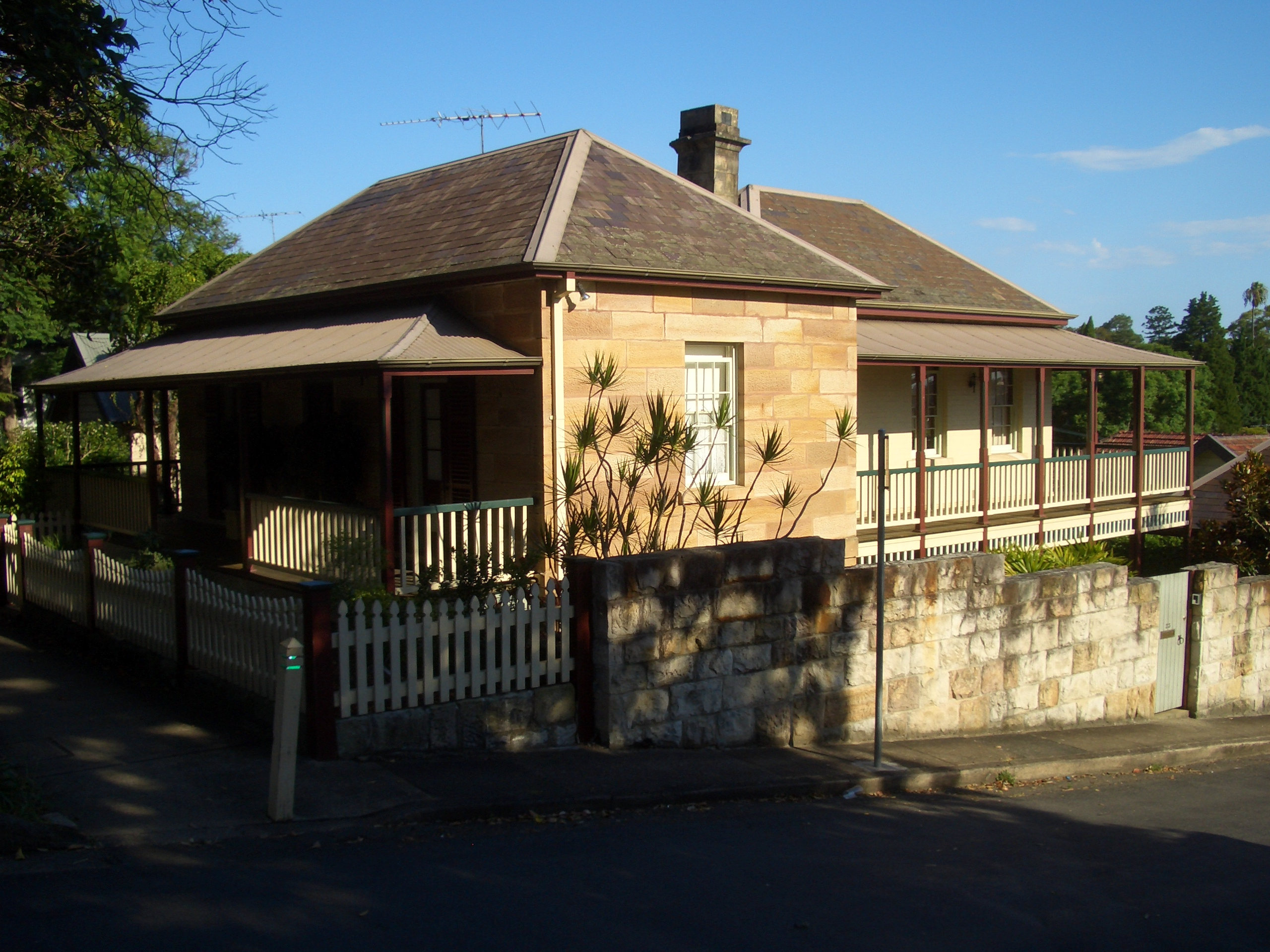
Former post office

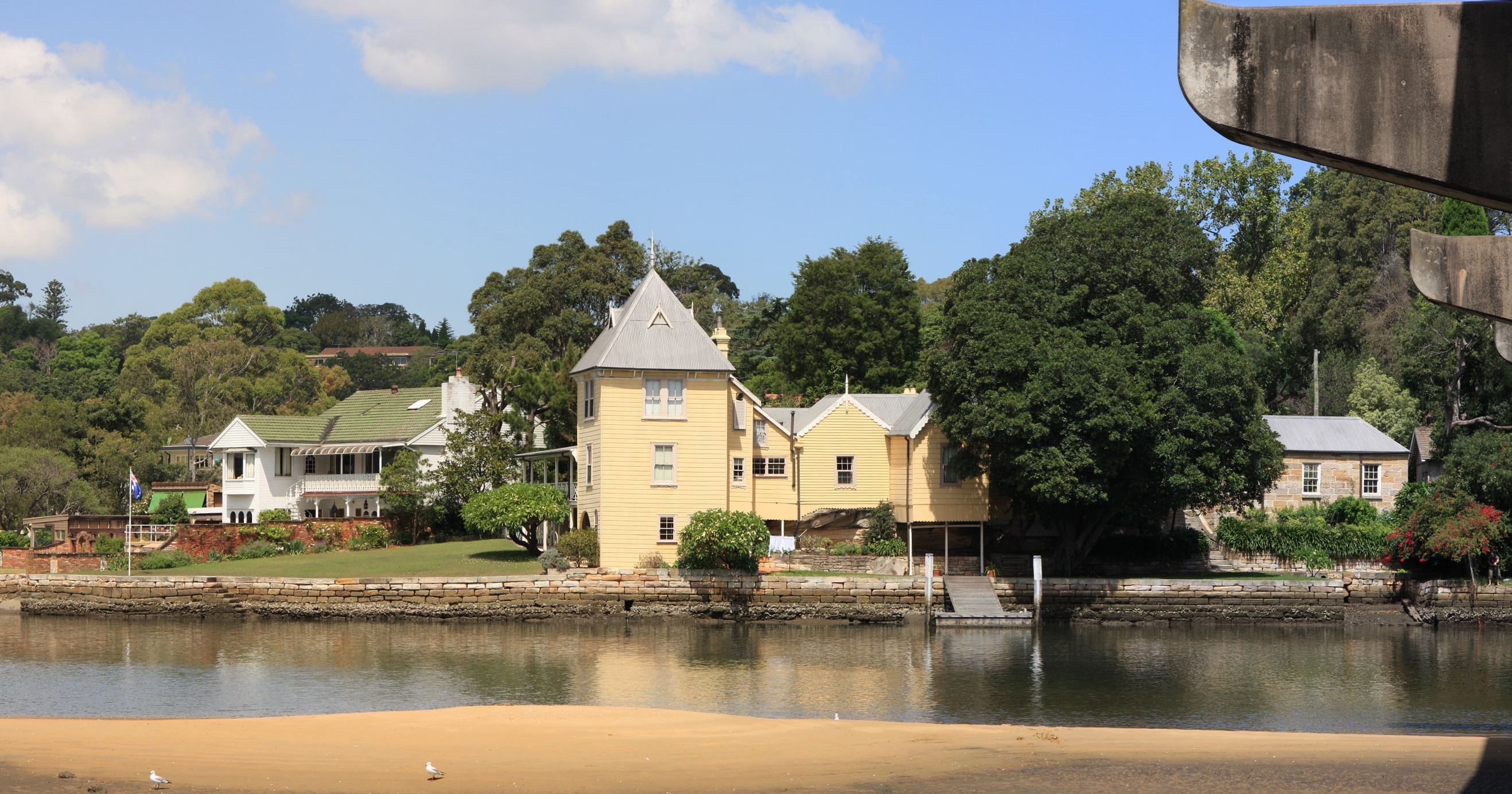
Fig Tree House seen from the Fig Tree Bridge

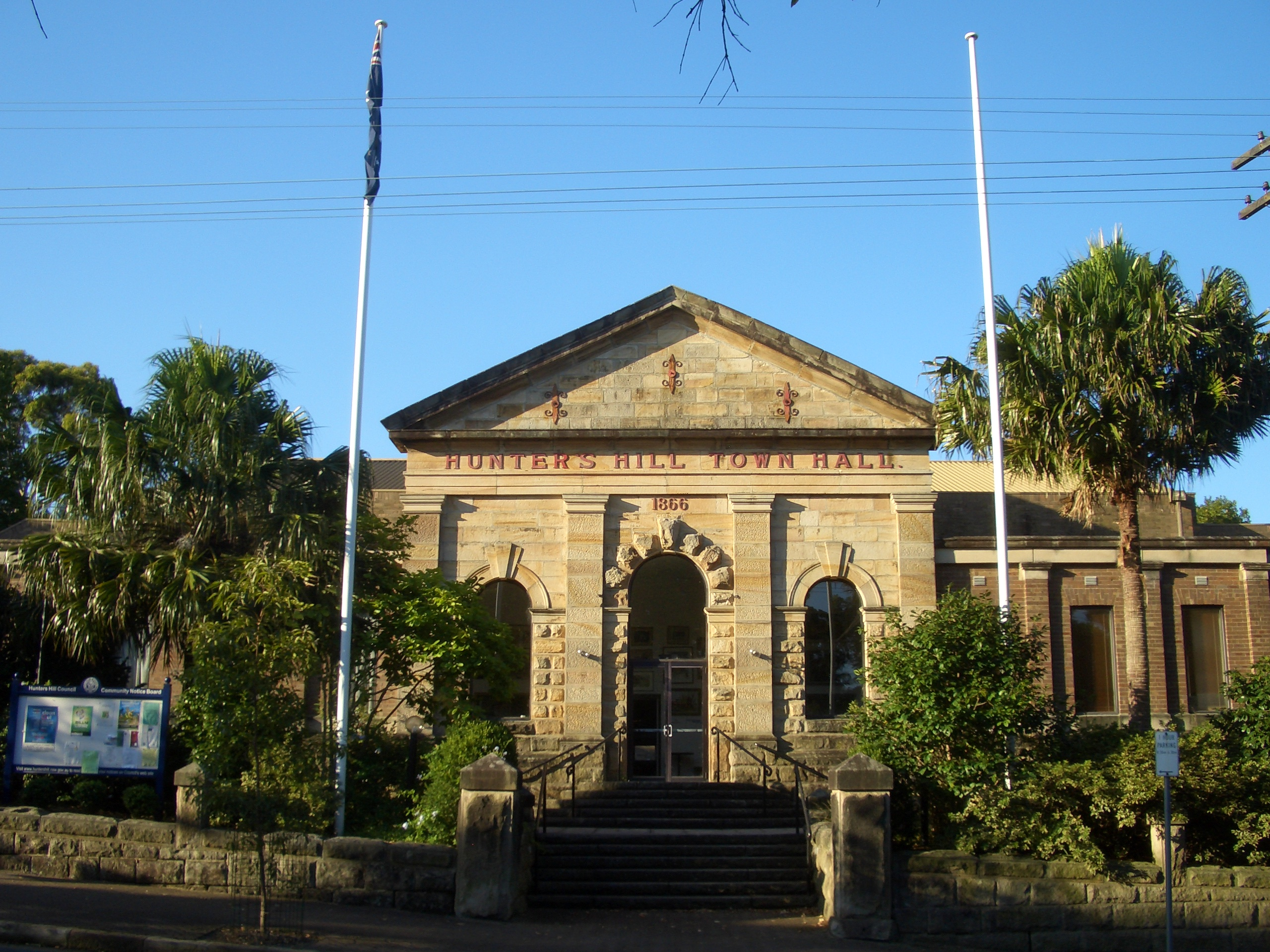
Town Hall

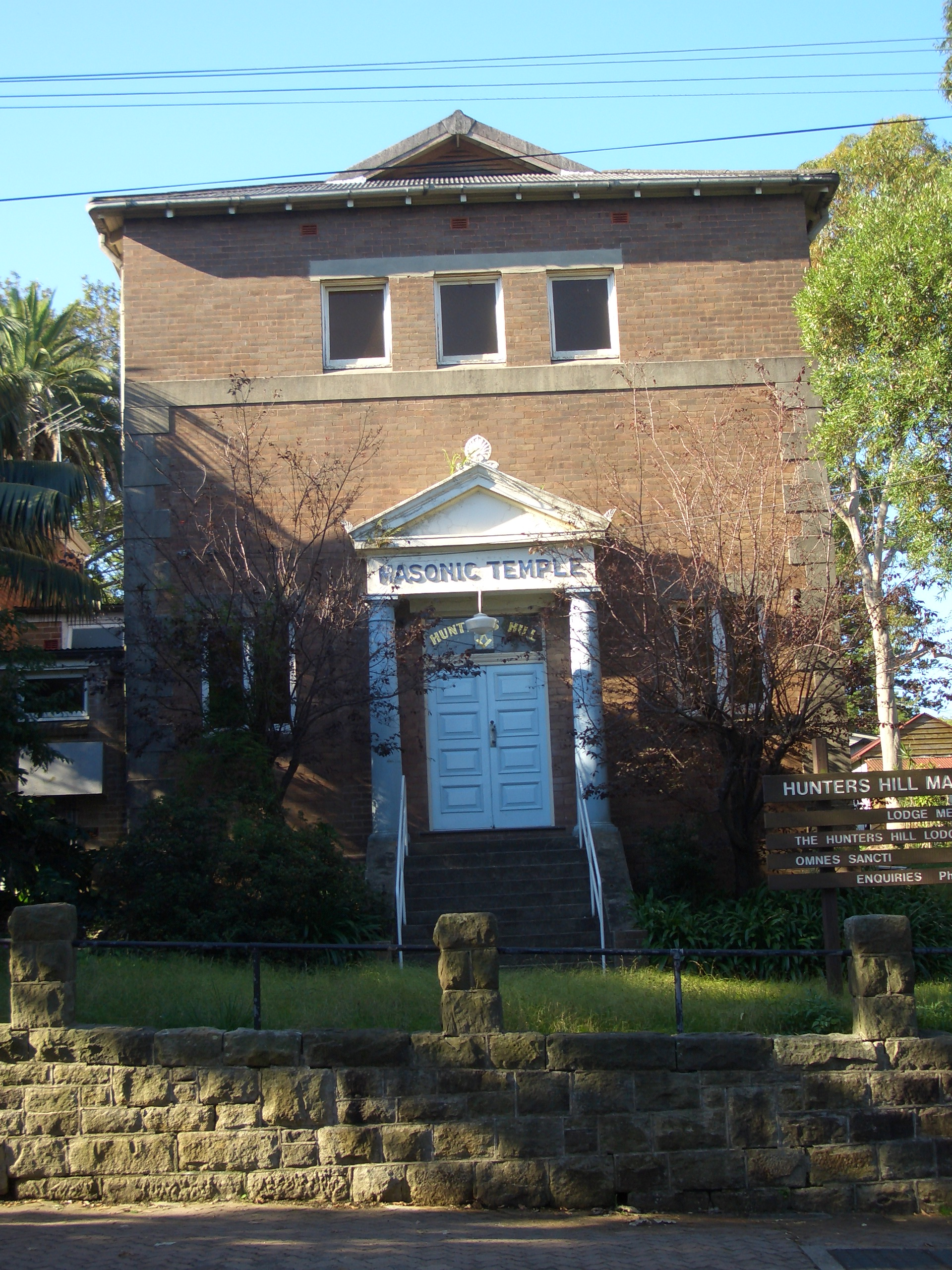
Masonic Temple
