= Hestock =

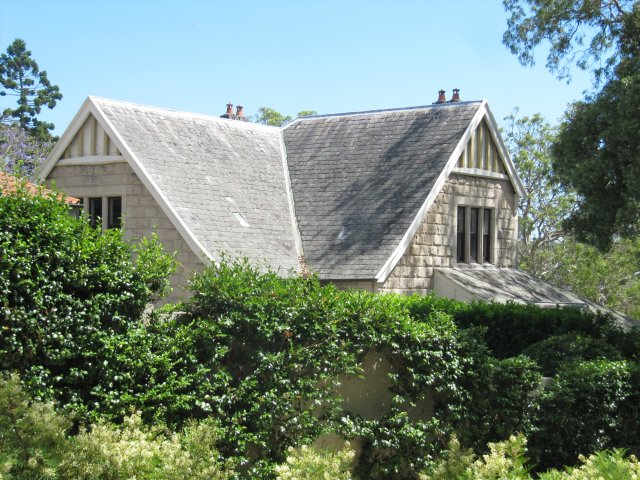

- Location within Sydney Location within Australia
- 33°50′14″S 151°09′39″E
- Location: 14 Crescent Street, Hunters Hill, Municipality of Hunter's Hill, New South Wales, Australia

History
- Built: 1885

Site notes
- Architect: Walter Liberty Vernon
- Architectural style: Federation Arts and Crafts

New South Wales Heritage Register
- Official name: Hestock; Le Chalet
- Type: State heritage (built)
- Designated: 2 April 1999
- Reference no.: 92
- Type: House
- Category: Residential buildings (private)

Hestock is a heritage-listed residence located at 14 Crescent Street in the Sydney suburb of Hunters Hill, New South Wales, Australia. It was designed by Walter Liberty Vernon and built during 1885. It is also known as Le Chalet. It was added to the New South Wales State Heritage Register on 2 April 1999.

== History ==
The land Hestock stands on was originally part of the Passy Estate, a landholding of considerable extent stretching from what is now Woolwich Road to Alexandra Bay between Ferry and Crescent Streets. Between 1855 and 1857 Passy, a substantial stone villa, was built for Monsieur Louis Sentis the French Consul at the time. Sentis sold shortly afterward to Edye Manning.

Hestock was built in 1885 by Alfred Christian Garrick the owner of Passy. The architect was Walter Liberty Vernon, later the New South Wales Government Architect from 1890 to 1911. Vernon also designed the Hunters Hill Post Office. The house was illustrated in the Australian Builder's and Contractor's News of 18 August 1888.

In 1886 John Arthur was the tenant of the house and H. B. Cotton from 1888. The house was named Le Chalet during (at least) the years 1890 to 1924. There is anecdotal evidence to suggest that it was known as Le Chalet up until 1968.

According to anecdotal evidence, the service wing originally featured a timber verandah (now demolished) which had a laundry with a bricked in copper and, later, a gas copper and cement wash tubs. Adjacent to this was a wood shed and a toilet. Before the subdivision of land on the Western boundary, there were two garages and two workmen's sheds as well as a corrugated iron work water tank.

The house itself has the words "Hestock AD 1881" carved into a dressed stone quoin adjacent to the entry porch. As Walter Liberty Vernon sold his architectural practise in Britain and came to Australia in 1883 the date on the house cannot be correct (as Vernon was not in Australia at that time). The house must have been constructed between 1883 (the time of Vernon's arrival in NSW) and 1888 (the years it was illustrated in the Builder's and Contractor's News). As it was occupied in 1886 it does appear that an 1885 construction date appears likely.

Hestock was nominated for a Permanent Conservation Order in 1979 by the then owner Mr Evans. The Permanent Conservation Order was gazetted on 27 June 1980. It was transferred to the State Heritage Register on 2 April 1999.

== Description ==
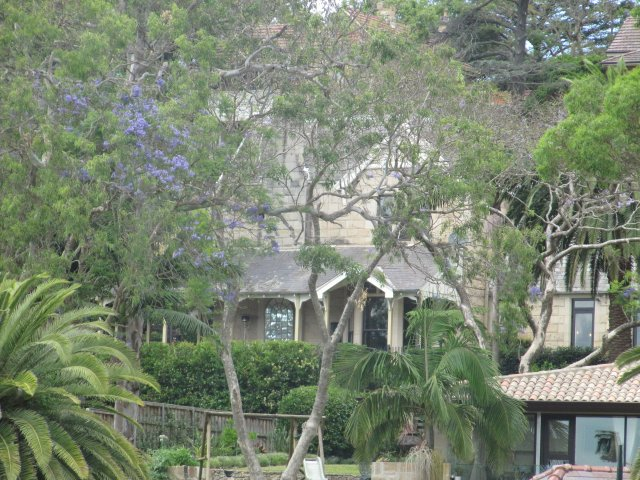
Hestock through the trees

Hestock is a substantial two-storey sandstone residence, with verandahs on three sides. The sandstone walls are rock-faced ashlar and feature smooth dressed quoins and smooth dressed stone mullions to the windows. The house is asymmetrical, with a steeply pitched gabled slate roof. Chimneys are sandstone with pairs of unglazed terracotta chimney pots. The gable ends feature imitation half-timbering. Windows are often in groups of three. The group of three windows lighting the entrance hall to the northeast of the entry porch feature geometrically patterned leadlights. Also adjacent to the entry porch, carved into one of the dressed quoins are the words "Hestock AD 1881".

The main return verandah to the front and the northeast side of the house features a slate roof. The rear service wing is single storey, also with a gabled slate roof and features a gabled roof vent. A stone garden wall joins the rear wall of the service wing and features a dressed top, curved dressed end and features a whimsical arrow-slit cross.

Internally the walls are plastered brick and ceilings are high with, in the front section of the house elaborately moulded cornices and large ceiling roses. In the rear service wing original plain plaster ceiling without cornices survive. There is an existing modern enlarged opening between the kitchen and the family room which does not extend to ceiling height.

=== Condition ===
As of 3 January 2013, the physical condition was excellent. Hestock retains a very high degree of integrity.

=== Modifications and dates ===
- 1920s – possible alteration of the verandah to the front and northeastern side of the house.
- 1988 – construction of a two-storey timber cottage to the northwest of the house

== Heritage listing ==
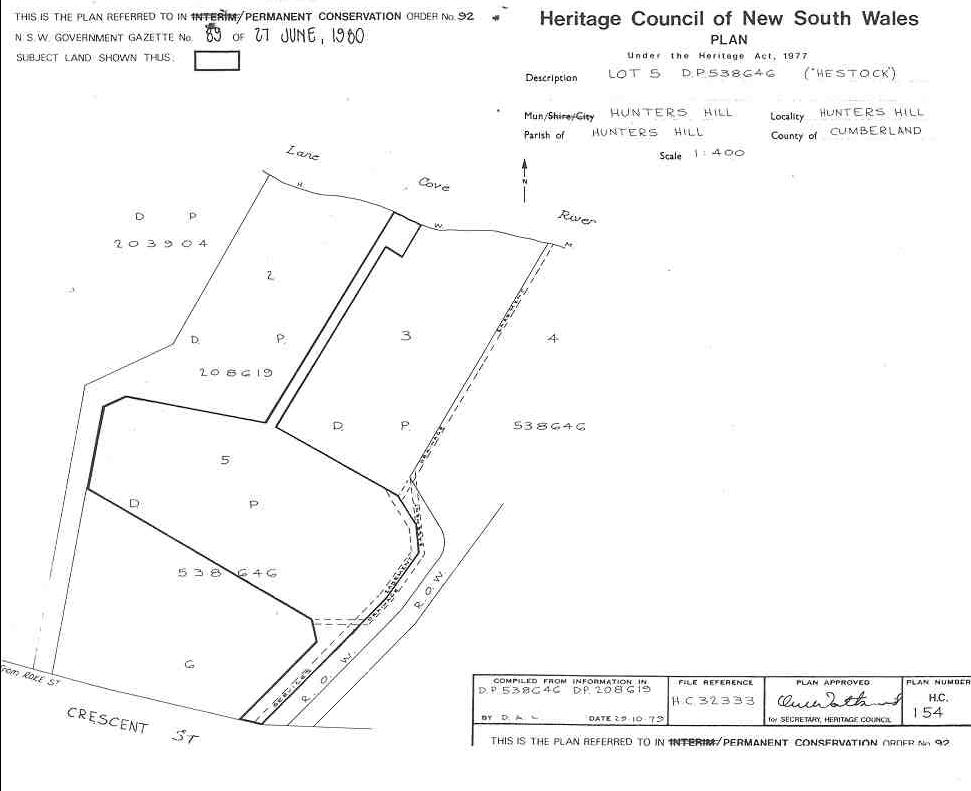
Heritage boundaries

As at 4 January 2013, Hestock is of State heritage significance as one of the few domestic buildings designed by eminent architect Walter Liberty Vernon who went on to become the New South Wales Government Architect from 1890 to 1911. Hestock is a seminal example of the architectural style known as Federation Arts and Crafts and has been designed "in the round" i.e. all elevations have received the same degree of attention to design and detail. Hestock retains a very high degree of fabric integrity and intactness. It is of significance as an early house of the Hunter's Hill peninsula with associations with both the estate and owners of "Passy".

Hestock was listed on the New South Wales State Heritage Register on 2 April 1999 having satisfied the following criteria.

The place has a strong or special association with a person, or group of persons, of importance of cultural or natural history of New South Wales's history.

Hestock is associated with "Passy" having been built for its owner Alfred Christian Garrick. Hestock is an important early work of the eminent architect Walter Liberty Vernon.

The place is important in demonstrating aesthetic characteristics and/or a high degree of creative or technical achievement in New South Wales.

Hestock is a seminal example of the architectural style which came to be known as Federation Arts and Crafts. Hestock has a particularly interesting design detail as it has been designed "in the round" i.e. all elevations have received the same degree of attention to design and detail.

== See also ==
- Australian residential architectural styles
- Federation architecture
