= Vienna, Hunters Hill =

Cottage in Sydney, Australia

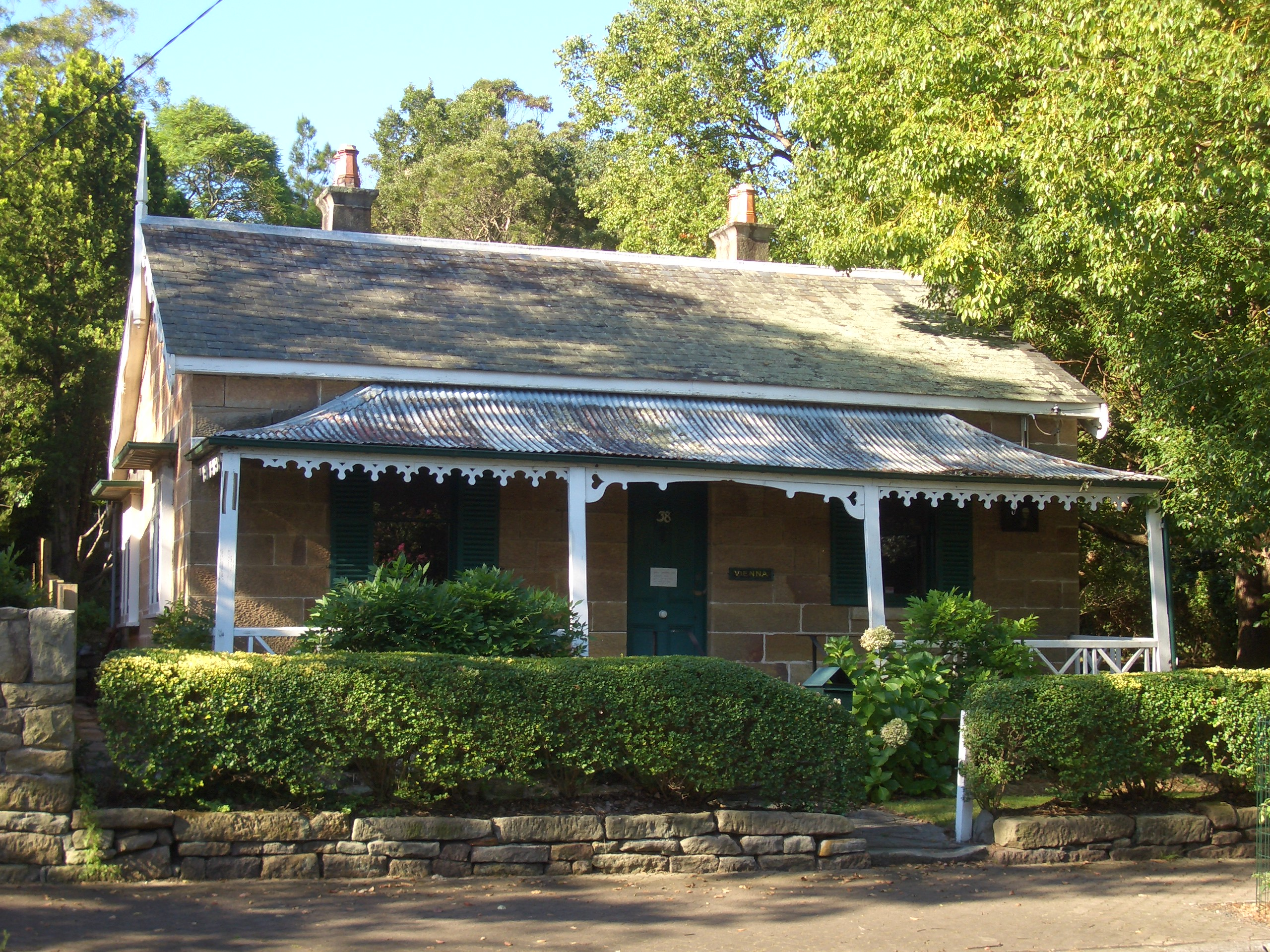
- Vienna, pictured in January 2008

- Location within Sydney Location within Australia
- 33°50′05″S 151°09′17″E
- Location: 38–40 Alexandra Street, Hunters Hill, Municipality of Hunter's Hill, New South Wales, Australia

History
- Built: 1871

Site notes
- Owner: National Trust of Australia (NSW)

New South Wales Heritage Register
- Official name: Vienna; Curan Curan; Carrum Carrum; Subiaco; Vienna Cottage
- Type: State heritage (built)
- Designated: 2 April 1999
- Reference no.: 459
- Type: Cottage
- Category: Residential buildings (private)
- Builders: Unknown

Vienna is a heritage-listed former house and now museum at 38–40 Alexandra Street, Hunters Hill in the Municipality of Hunter's Hill local government area of New South Wales, Australia. It was built in 1871 and is known as Curan Curan, Carrum Carrum, Subiaco and Vienna Cottage. The property is owned by the National Trust of Australia (NSW). It was added to the New South Wales State Heritage Register on 2 April 1999.

== History ==
=== History of Hunters Hill ===
At the time of European contact, the Kelly's bush area was inhabited by the Wal Umedegal Clan, who spoke the Guringai language. They lived primarily on fish and shellfish, supplementing their diet when necessary with vegetables, marsupials, birds and grubs. They were also frequently observed firing the scrub to facilitate access to the foreshore and flush out game. Very little is known of their social structure and religious beliefs.

Captain John Hunter (1737–1821) of the Sirius charted Sydney Harbour in 1788. On 28 January 1788 he wrote in his journal: "A few days after my arrival with the transports in Port Jackson, I set off with a six-oared boat and a small boat, intending to make as good a survey of the harbour as circumstances would admit: I took to my assistance Mr Bradley, the first lieutenant, Mr Keltie, the master, and a young gentleman of the quarter-deck (midshipman Henry Waterhouse)." Hunter's meticulous chart shows 30 depth soundings around the peninsula bounded by the Parramatta and Lane Cove Rivers. Hunter was Governor of the Colony from 1795 to 1800. He is commemorated in the name of Hunters Hill.

In 1855, a speculative housing venture was underway to erect four prefabricated Swiss Cottages at Hunters Hill. In this period, Hunters Hill was an established French enclave, with the residence of the French consul located there at "Passy", and much of its early development was constructed by men of French descent. The prefabricated houses were advertised as "four splendid family residences, standing in their own grounds, of about 1 acres each," with "wood and water in abundance."

In her study of Hunter Hill, Beverley Sherry notes that this was the first planned group of houses to be built in the municipality, marking the beginning of the garden suburb character of Australia's oldest garden suburb. The subdivision and garden suburb development occurred in the mid to late nineteenth century, predating the formation of the Garden Suburb movement. The historic development at Hunters Hill was consistently speculative, although some subdivisions were undertaken to provide residences for family members.

=== Vienna ===
Vienna was built in 1871 for John Jacob Hellman (later Hillman) and his Irish wife Ann. He originally came from Hamburg, Germany, and his wife Ann (née O'Donnell) came from Mooneenreave, County Leitrim, Ireland. Ann came to Australia in 1857 as a bounty migrant. They were married in 1860, and purchased what is now 36 to 40 Alexandra Street from Herman Heinrich Groth for A£60 on 19 November 1866. This land formed lots 11 and 12 of a Jules Joubert subdivision of 1859. The area was initially owned by John Roby Hatfield by a crown grant dated 12 July 1839.

John Jacob Hellman was a shoemaker by occupation. In the 1870s, he had a shop at 171/2 Erskine Street, City and later worked as a shoemaker at St. Joseph's College. He and his wife owned cattle and ran a dairy and orchard, and in the early 1880s, he was also the lamp lighter of the Borough of Hunter's Hill. Six children, all except the first, were baptised at the Villa Maria Church, Hunters Hill, as Hillman, not Hellman. Their second son, Hugh (born 8.7.1870), was enrolled as a boarder at St. Joseph's College on the first day (18.7.1881), when the College began at Hunter's Hill.

The Hellmans also owned the cottage 'Redleaf (36 Alexandra Street) and after the death of his wife, Arm (5.8.1908), John Jacoh and his youngest son, James Frederick (born 9.6.1873), moved in 1912 from Vienna into that weatherboard cottage. At that time, his son Hugh was the owner occupier of Alroy (34 Alexandra Street), and his married daughter Mary King (born 19.8.1867) and her children lived in Vienna.

After his father's death, James Frederick, a tailor by occupation, became the owner of both Vienna and Redleaf and continued to live in Redleaf until 1923. In the 1920s, he made some changes to Vienna, including inserting side windows to allow more light into the rooms. Mary King left Vienna in 1923, and another of John Jacob's sons, John Hillman (born 15.5.1865), lived there until 1926. Several tenants then occupied the cottage, the Anderson family since 1941, George Anderson being the tenant in 1983. James Frederick never married, and after his death in 1958, the cottage passed to one of his nieces, Gladys Hillman, who is still the owner.

Vienna was known from its construction in 1871 until the 1920s as Carrum Carrum. When occupied by John Hillman Jnr in 1924, it was called Subiaco, but since the 1930s, its name has been Vienna.

The adjoining land (40 Alexandra Street), part of Lot 12 of the original Joubert subdivision of 1859, has never been built upon. For many years, it was an orchard with a variety of trees bearing oranges, mandarins, lemons, plums, quinces, pomegranates and guavas. The land has always been an integral part of Vienna. It also contains the old well, which is now covered over.

In 1984, Vienna Cottage was purchased by the National Trust of Australia (NSW) with funding from the local Vienna Appeal Committee.

== Description ==
Vienna is a four-roomed stone gabled roofed cottage with front and back verandahs on a rectangular suburban block with a small front garden and a long rear garden, with a remnant orchard.

The adjoining land (40 Alexandra Street), part of Lot 12 of the original Joubert subdivision of 1859, has never been built upon. For many years, it was an orchard with a variety of trees bearing oranges, mandarins, lemons, plums, quinces, pomegranates and guavas. The land has always been an integral part of Vienna. It also contains the old well, which is now covered over.

The roof is slated and the doors are four-panelled. The shuttered windows at the front of the house are plate glass, while those at the back are small paned with crown glass. The house retains its early Victorian style timber chimneypieces, and in the front rooms are pretty circular ceiling roses, which are the only elaboration of the plasterwork.

Behind the house is a weatherboard service block, with an iron roof and stone chimney. This is linked to the main house by a simple covered way across a narrow flagged court.

=== Condition ===
As at 3 March 2000, the physical condition was good.

=== Modifications and dates ===
- 1920s: windows put in side walls to allow more light into the rooms.
- 2007–08: garden restoration was completed, including ornaments, pots, implements, fence repair, installing a new gate and a security device.

== Heritage listing ==
As of 2 January 2013, Vienna was an excellent example of a tradesman's cottage of the nineteenth century, complete with its detached kitchen block. Its intactness makes it rare in Sydney. This is evidenced by 1861–1890, when Hunter's Hill first developed as a suburb, and it stands on the village's earliest successful small lot subdivision. The subdivision was undertaken by Jules Joubert, who, along with his brother Didier, was Hunter's Hill's first and most prominent developer. The cottage demonstrates the tradesman's way of life of the 19th century, and how the family adapted the cottage to accommodate changing needs and standards.

Vienna was listed on the New South Wales State Heritage Register on 2 April 1999, satisfying the following criteria.

The place is important in demonstrating the course, or pattern, of cultural or natural history in New South Wales.

Vienna is an excellent example of a tradesman's cottage of the nineteenth century, complete with its detached kitchen block. This is evidenced by 1861–1890, when Hunter's Hill first developed as a suburb and stood on the village's earliest successful small lot subdivision. The subdivision was undertaken by Jules Joubert, who, along with his brother Didier, was Hunter's Hill's first and most prominent developer. The cottage demonstrates the tradesman's way of life of the 19th century, and how the family adapted the cottage to accommodate changing needs and standards.

The place is important in demonstrating aesthetic characteristics and/or a high degree of creative or technical achievement in New South Wales.

The un-built upon land, once an orchard, is rare evidence of the reliance of suburban families in the 19th and early 20th century on home produce, and is a significant feature of the property.

The place has a strong or special association with a particular community or cultural group in New South Wales for social, cultural or spiritual reasons.

Vienna, combined with the adjoining Hillman cottages of Alroy and Redleaf, demonstrate the once common pattern of family property ownership, and the later subdivision of the land demonstrates, in microcosm, the speculative nature of land ownership in Hunter's Hill.

The place has the potential to yield information that will contribute to an understanding of the cultural or natural history of New South Wales.

The cottage has considerable educational value. The cottage demonstrates the tradesman's way of life of the 19th century, and how the family adapted the cottage to accommodate changing needs and standards.

The place possesses uncommon, rare or endangered aspects of the cultural or natural history of New South Wales.

Its intactness makes it rare in Sydney.

== See also ==
- Australian residential architectural styles
