= Milthorpe, Hunters Hill =

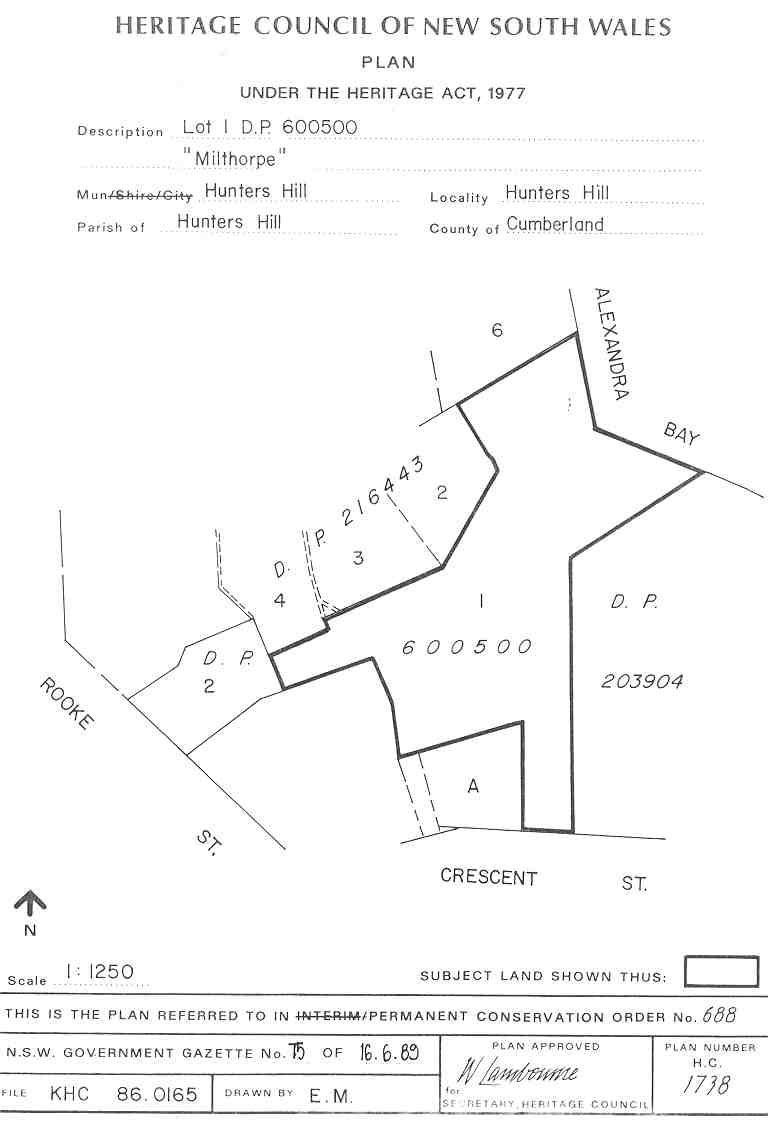
- Heritage boundaries

- Location within Sydney Location within Australia
- 33°50′12″S 151°09′36″E
- Location: 12 Crescent Street, Hunters Hill, Municipality of Hunter's Hill, New South Wales, Australia

History
- Built: 1872

Site notes
- Architectural styles: Mid-Victorian; Federation

New South Wales Heritage Register
- Official name: Milthorpe; Atherslei
- Type: State heritage (built)
- Designated: 2 April 1999
- Reference no.: 688
- Type: Villa
- Category: Residential buildings (private)
- Builders: Richard Sim

Milthorpe is a heritage-listed residence located at 12 Crescent Street, Hunters Hill in the Municipality of Hunter's Hill local government area of New South Wales, Australia. It was built during 1872 by Richard Sim. It is also known as Atherslei. It was added to the New South Wales State Heritage Register on 2 April 1999.

== History ==
The site of Milthorpe was originally granted to a Mr Morgan and bought by Foss as part of his estate in 1862. Lots 6–10 were purchased in one parcel running in a rectangular block from the Lane Cove River to Passy Avenue from Alexandra Street and a line drawn from Abrose Street to Rooke Street. Milthorpe was originally set in a larger estate but has been reduced by previous excisions of the property, the most major recent subdivision taking place in 1976 when a number of new lots were created in Rooke Street. At this time Milthorpe had an area of 12,240 square metres (131,800 sq ft).

Milthorpe is thought to have been built in 1872 by Richard Sim as a fourteen-room stone house. The building was given a Federation style appearance after remodelling around 1900.

The river edge is marked by a stone retaining wall. The land behind this wall was reclaimed early in the twentieth century. Stone baths with access to the river were sited until 1924 where the central BBQ shelter now stands. A sandstone wall with columns ran from the baths across the reclaimed land. Part of this stone wall remains at the waters edge. Behind the reclaimed land the site climbed through a series of informal retaining walls to two terraces of sloping lawn.

== Description ==
Milthorpe is sited on a terrace well back from the river in the traditional nineteenth century Hunters Hill manner. It is a substantial stone residence set within extensive landscaped grounds on the Lane Cove River. It has a slate roof and faces north-east, overlooking the sloping lawn and gardens to the flat reclaimed area and the Lane Cove River beyond. Milthorpe has appurtenant garage and workshop areas to its rear boundary.

The flat, reclaimed portion of the land is further developed with a large L-shaped boat shed and cabana adjacent to the waters edge, an inground swimming pool and a synthetic surface tennis court. A gazebo is located within the landscaped area to the north of the main dwelling. The river edge is marked by a stone retaining wall.

=== Condition ===
As at 3 January 2013, the physical condition was very good.

=== Modifications and dates ===
- 1900 – Remodelling – gives Milthorpe a Federation style appearance.
- 1976 – Subdivision of land.
- c. 1972 – Sandstone extensions
- 1985 – Internal maintenance and remedial work.
- Post 1985 – Various renovations, alterations and additions – gates, cabana replaced with sandstone caretakers cottage.
- Fenestraton and joinery replaced over time due to white ants and general deterioration.

== Heritage listing ==
As at 1 October 1997, Milthorpe was a good example of the substantial villas built on large sites which were a feature of the historical development of Hunters Hill in the nineteenth century. In particular, it is one of the few large estates of this period in Hunters Hill which has retained its historic setting on the foreshores of the Lane Cove River. The house is of architectural interest because of the quality of its features and its adaption from a mid-Victorian to a Federation style.

Milthorpe was listed on the New South Wales State Heritage Register on 2 April 1999 having satisfied the following criteria.

The place is important in demonstrating the course, or pattern, of cultural or natural history in New South Wales.

Milthorpe is one of the few remaining privately owned nineteenth century villa estates left in Sydney Harbour which has retained much of its original land and its physical links with the water. Its siting and setting demonstrates the distinctive characteristics of the nineteenth century Hunters Hill marine villa development.

The place is important in demonstrating aesthetic characteristics and/or a high degree of creative or technical achievement in New South Wales.

Milthorpe is of aesthetic significance for the way it is sited to address the water, with a backdrop of large, dense trees and for the way it can be viewed from a public wharf, public ferry route and from the Lane Cove River. Its wide, reclaimed foreshore area properly belongs to and enhances the house and characterises the late 19th and early 20th century scale and use of foreshore villa gardens, compensating for subdivision developments which crowd its other boundaries.

== See also ==
- Australian residential architectural styles
