= The Garibaldi =

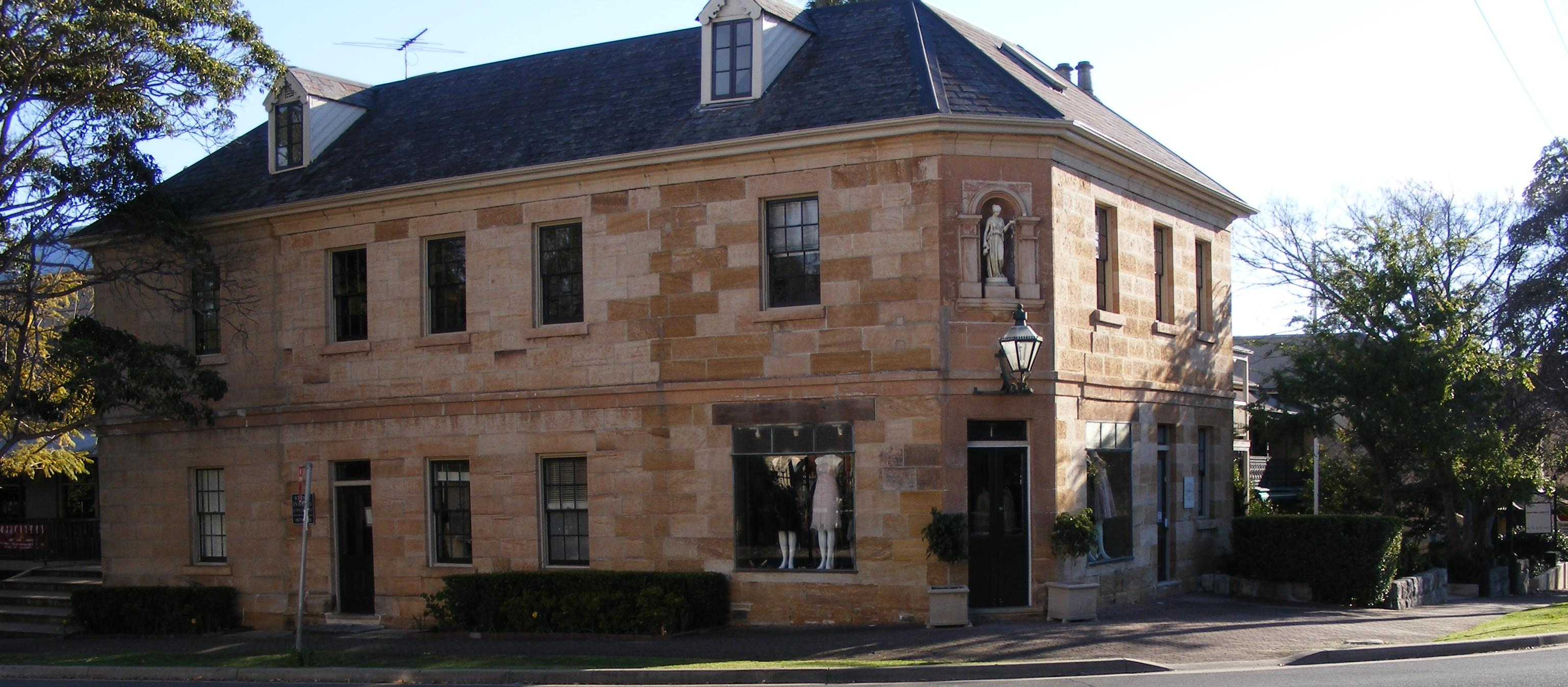
- The Garibaldi, pictured in 2007

- Location within Sydney Location within Australia
- 33°50′07″S 151°09′21″E
- Location: Ferry Street, Hunters Hill, Municipality of Hunter's Hill, New South Wales, Australia

History
- Built: 1861–1862

New South Wales Heritage Register
- Official name: Garibaldi, The; The Garibaldi Inn
- Type: State heritage (built)
- Designated: 2 April 1999
- Reference no.: 135
- Type: Inn/Tavern
- Category: Commercial
- Builders: John Cuneo

The Garibaldi is a heritage-listed building in Sydney, Australia. Located on Ferry Street in the suburb of Hunters Hill, New South Wales, it has seen use at different times as a residence, inn and retail building. It was built from 1861 to 1862 by John Cuneo. It is also known as Garibaldi and The Garibaldi Inn. The property is owned by Garibaldi Inn (Private). It was added to the New South Wales State Heritage Register on 2 April 1999.

== History ==
=== History of Hunters Hill ===
Captain John Hunter (1737-1821) of the Sirius, charted Sydney Harbour in 1788. On 28 January 1788 he wrote in his journal: "A few days after my arrival with the transports in Port Jackson, I set off with a six-oared boat and a small boat, intending to make as good a survey of the harbour as circumstances would admit: I took to my assistance Mr Bradley, the first lieutenant, Mr Keltie, the master, and a young gentleman of the quarter-deck (midshipman Henry Waterhouse)." Hunter's meticulous chart shows 30 depth soundings around the peninsula bounded by the Parramatta and Lane Cove Rivers. Hunter was Governor of the Colony from 1795-1800. He is commemorated in the name of Hunters Hill.

In 1855 a speculative housing venture of erecting four prefabricated Swiss Cottages at Hunters Hill was underway. In this period Hunters Hill was an established French enclave, with the residence of the French consul located there at "Passy", and much of its early development was constructed by men of French descent. The prefabricated houses were advertised as "four splendid family residences, standing in their own grounds, of about 1 acres each", with "wood and water in abundance".

Beverley Sherry in her study of Hunter Hill notes that this was the first planned group of houses to be built in the municipality, marking the beginning of the garden suburb character of Australia's oldest Garden Suburb. The subdivision and garden suburb development occurred in the mid to late nineteenth century, predating the formation of the Garden Suburb movement. The historic development at Hunters Hill was consistently speculative, although some of the subdivisions were undertaken to provide residences for family members.

=== Garibaldi Inn ===
The Garibaldi Inn was built of the local golden sandstone by John Cuneo (who came from Genoa, Italy in 1854) during the 1860s as the suburb's first hotel. Hunter's Hill Rate Assessment Books indicate that it was unfinished in 1861, substantially completed by 1869 and that Cuneo continued to add rooms until 1881 when it was described as a "16 room hotel". The attic rooms were once used to house Italian stonemasons who were constructing buildings and residences in the area.

John Cuneo was one of the indentured stonemasons brought out to New South Wales to build fine stone houses in the Hunters Hill area district by Count de Milhau and the Jobert Brothers. Cuneo also imported statues from Italy through his marble business until 1861.

The building is named The Garibaldi Inn in honour of Giuseppe Garibaldi (1807-1882) a compatriot, military leader and national hero of the Italian people who fought for the liberation and unification of Italy. The Garibaldi also features a statue of a woman cupbearer in the niche above the door.

The Cuneos wer shopkeepers, yachtsmen and had a jazz band. 'Cuneo's Corner' was the centre of the suburb's social activity and 'Cuneo's Recreation Ground' was on the opposite corner.

The inn was run as a hotel until 1911 when it lost its licence. In the New South Wales State election of 1910, during an era of temperance fervour, a local option vote was taken on the question of reducing the number of hotels and Hunter's Hill (in the district of Lane Cove) voted for a reduction. This may relate to the fact that The Garibaldi ceased to be a hotel after 1911.

By 1912 the building began to be rented as a shop by Mrs Nelly Rehm (confectioner) and continued as such under various tenants. Relative minor alterations were made to the building in 1911/12 when it was converted from an Inn to use as a shop.

The Tanianes who were there from 1934 to 1976 and they bought the building from the Cuneo family in 1949. A fruit and vegetable shop was run from where the bar had been by Mr Peter and Miss Mary Taniane.

The building gradually fell into neglect and in 1971 Amoco made a bid for the site with the intention of demolishing the building for a service station. At this time the conservation movement in Australia was well under way and the Hunter's Hill people were able to prevent the demolition of The Garibaldi. In 1973 the original statue of Hebe, the gods' female cupbearer was stolen.

Following a community nomination a Permanent Conservation Order was placed over the building on 16 October 1981.

From the Tanianes, The Garibaldi passed to a succession of owners in the late 1970s and early 1980s. Attempts were made at the time to return the building to some kind of social purpose as in the days of John Cuneo. There were applications to develop it as a restaurant and then as an Inn. These applications were refused due to the local community outcry.

In 1983 The Garibaldi was bought by Barry Webb & Associates, a firm of consulting engineers for use as offices. With the approval of the State government and Hunter's Hill Council the remaining parts of the site were redeveloped with offices, shops and underground parking.

On the 2 April 1999 The Garibaldi was transferred to the State Heritage Register.

== Description ==
The Garibaldi is prominently located on the corner of Alexandra Street and Ferry Street Hunters Hill. It is a fine and substantial two-storey sandstone building punctuated by eight pane sash windows and a slate roof. The corner is truncated with an entrance door and above is a niche with a statue of a woman cup bearer. Attic in roof.

=== Condition ===
As at 22 January 2013, the physical condition was excellent.

== Heritage listing ==
As at 22 January 2013, The Garibaldi is of State heritage significance for its associations with John Cuneo an Italian stonemason who was brought to New South Wales by the Joubert brothers and the Count de Milhau to assist in developing the area. It is of historic significance for its close associations with the evolution of Hunters Hill and as the first Inn constructed in Hunters Hill. Constructed in c. 1862 The Garibaldi is of aesthetic significance as a fine and substantial two-storey structure of dressed sandstone with a slate roof. It is substantially intact and makes an important contribution to the streetscape.

The Garibaldi was listed on the New South Wales State Heritage Register on 2 April 1999.

== See also ==
- Australian residential architectural styles
