= Kellys Bush Park =

Heritage-listed bushland in Hunter's Hill, NSW, Australia

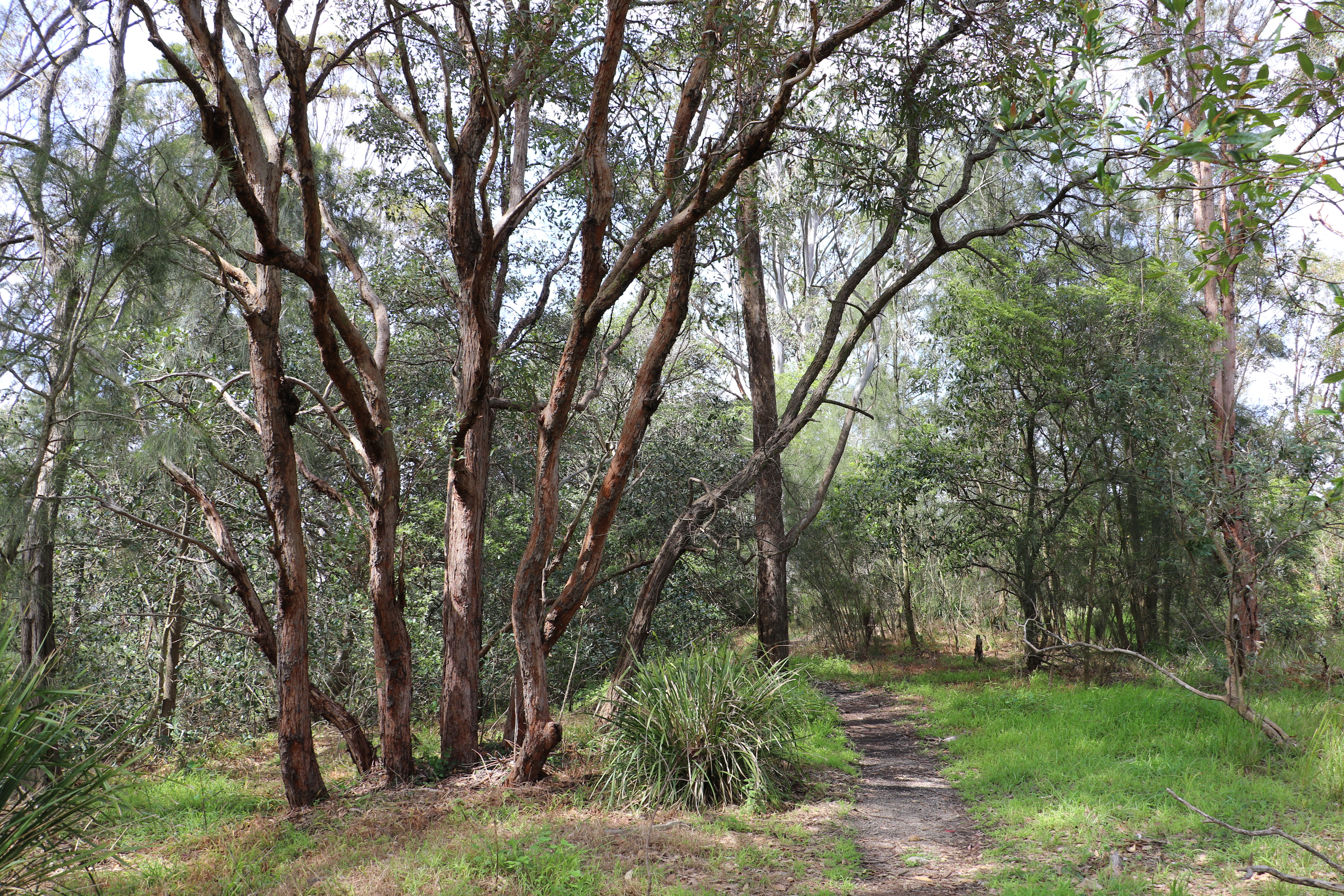

- Location within Sydney Location within Australia
- 33°50′32″S 151°10′02″E
- Location: Nelson Parade, Hunters Hill, Municipality of Hunter's Hill, New South Wales, Australia

Site notes
- Owner: Department of Planning and Environment

New South Wales Heritage Register
- Official name: Kellys Bush Park; Weil Park; The Smelting Company
- Type: State heritage (landscape)
- Designated: 2 April 1999
- Reference no.: 1391
- Type: Reserve
- Category: Parks, Gardens and Trees
- Builders: N/A

The Kellys Bush Park is a heritage-listed bushland, partly on the former site of smelting works, at Nelson Parade, Hunters Hill in the Municipality of Hunter's Hill local government area of New South Wales, Australia. It is also known as Weil Park and The Smelting Company. The property is owned by Department of Planning and Environment, a department of the Government of New South Wales. It was added to the New South Wales State Heritage Register on 2 April 1999. It is famous for the green ban that was enacted by trade unionists to prevent its destruction.

== History ==
=== Indigenous history ===
At the time of European contact the Kelly's bush area was inhabited by the Wallumettagal Clan who spoke the Guringai language. They lived primarily on fish and shellfish, supplementing their diet when necessary with vegetables, marsupials, birds and grubs. They were also frequently observed firing the scrub both to facilitate access to the foreshore and to flush out game. Very little is known of their social structure and religious beliefs.

=== Development of Hunters Hill ===
Captain John Hunter (1737–1821) of the Sirius, charted Sydney Harbour in 1788. On 28 January 1788 he wrote in his journal: "A few days after my arrival with the transports in Port Jackson, I set off with a six-oared boat and a small boat, intending to make as good a survey of the harbour as circumstances would admit: I took to my assistance Mr Bradley, the first lieutenant, Mr Keltie, the master, and a young gentleman of the quarter-deck (midshipman Henry Waterhouse)." Hunter's meticulous chart shows 30 depth soundings around the peninsula bounded by the Parramatta and Lane Cove rivers. Hunter was Governor of the Colony from 1795–1800. He is commemorated in the name of Hunters Hill.

In 1855 a speculative housing venture of erecting four prefabricated Swiss Cottages at Hunters Hill was underway. In this period Hunters Hill was an established French enclave, with the residence of the French consul located there at "Passy", and much of its early development was constructed by men of French descent. The prefabricated houses were advertised as "four splendid family residences, standing in their own grounds, of about 1 acres each", with "wood and water in abundance".

Beverley Sherry in her study of Hunter Hill notes that this was the first planned group of houses to be built in the municipality, marking the beginning of the garden suburb character of Australia's oldest Garden Suburb. The subdivision and garden suburb development occurred in the mid to late nineteenth century, predating the formation of the Garden Suburb movement. The historic development at Hunters Hill was consistently speculative, although some of the subdivisions were undertaken to provide residences for family members.

=== Kelly's Bush ===
Kelly's Bush derives its name from Thomas H. Kelly who owned over 7.7 hectares (19 acres) of land on the foreshore of Hunter's Hill (stretching from Woolwich Road south to the Parramatta River). This area was bounded by the Parramatta River, Woolwich Road, Nelson Parade and Alfred Street. He established the Smelting Company on seven point seven hectares (nineteen acres) of waterfront land in 1892, with the adjoining seventeen acres of bush to the north designed to act as a buffer to the residential areas and zoned "open space". The smelting company allowed public access to the foreshore for recreation, through all areas except the actual works area. The condition of the surrounding bush fluctuated, depending on the amount of timber being used to fire the smelters.

Almost two point eight hectares (seven acres) of the "open space" became known as Weil Park when it was purchased in 1956 by Hunter's Hill Council and the Cumberland County Council. The bush was cleared and a grassed oval created for sporting activities. In 1966 the Town Clerk wrote to the State Planning Authority stating: "There is insufficient area in the land held and known as Weil Park and Council feels that it is important to the interest of posterity that additional "open space" area should be acquired whilst the opportunity exists".

In 1967 the Smelting Company works moved to Alexandria and AVJennings took a two-year option to purchase the 4.9-hectare (12-acre) site. They applied to Council seeking suspension of the County of Cumberland Planning Scheme Ordinance to enable the development of 147 home units, including three buildings of eight-storeys high. Council was opposed to the application and renewed its bid for State acquisition of the entire area as open space, however the State Planning Authority rejected the proposal. Jennings subsequently submitted a series of modified applications. The Hunters Hill Trust strongly condemned the Jennings development.

The SPA then arranged to buy from Jennings 2.3 hectares (5.6 acres) of sloping waterfront bush and abandoned industrial reserve for a "foreshore reserve". In 1969 the Council agreed in principle to a suspension of the existing zoning to permit the development of 56 townhouses (without any public consultation). This was subsequently reduced to 25 single dwelling allotments.

In an article that appeared in the Sydney Morning Herald on 25 July 1970 local Hunters Hill resident Betty James wrote how local children had pulled up a long line of survey pegs laid out through "their bush" as a heartfelt protest. Her article read like a love-letter to Kelly's Bush, describing its deep gullies of bracken fern, its blueberry ash, lily-pilly, tea tree and a rare stand of healthy banksias. James...also talked about it as an outdoor laboratory and living museum: there were Aboriginal middens and carvings in the sandstone. In September 1970, James and 12 other neighbours gathered at All Saints' parish hall and christened themselves the 'Battlers for Kelly's Bush'. The group, which the Hunters Hill Council would dismiss as "13 bloody housewives", elected James as President, Kath Lehany as secretary and Monica Sheehan as assistant secretary. Most of the women were lifelong Liberal Party voters who had never been involved in politics but each had a different reason for joining...Miriam Cunningham...had realised when she had been to Australia Square, then Sydney's tallest building, that Kellys Bush was the only patch of green she could see on the Parramatta River. "It was the lungs of Sydney.".

A group of concerned citizens had formed by this stage and called themselves "The Battlers".

Unwittingly, the battlers set down a blueprint for the modern-day protest movement. They wrote hundreds of letters. They organised a "phone tree" to pass on news. They invited media to "boil the billy" days in the bush and plied them with baked goods. They ran essay competitions for schoolchildren about why the bush should be saved. They made badges and banners and got their teenagers to hang them around Hunters Hill. They enlisted the local school band, which marched form Hunters Hill High School to Kellys Bush, calling for "browsing not housing". They even roped in local Kylie Tennant to write protest poems. Dinner parties became battlegrounds and the peninsula community divided over the issue. Some wanted the sewage pipes that A.V.Jennings promised to build for the whole area or believed local state Liberal MP Peter Coleman, who said Council rares would drop when Jennings came...Over the course of several months, the battlers sent several delegations to the Liberal Premier of the day, Robert Askin, to argue their case. "Askin derided us as middle-class matrons" says Hunters Hill resident Phil Jenkyn, who says the women inspired him to form a group known as the Defenders of Sydney Harbour Foreshores.

They met with the (then) Premier Robert Askin, asking him to intervene. The Battlers also wrote to the various unions asking for their support and were referred to the Trades and Labour Council.

Despite the protest, in 1971 the Minister for Local Government signed the notice rezoning the land from Reserved Open Space to Residential. The President of the Builders Labourers' Federation of Australia (BLF) met with The Battlers and went to the BLF executive, who supported them in principle. The trade union support resulted in the first "black ban" called on 16 June 1971 by the BLF over an area of land. Black bans would later become known as "green ban" for their active pursuit of the maintenance of green space. Six hundred people attended a rally in August 1971 to demonstrate their support for Kelly's Bush.

In late 1971 a sealed tin box reportedly containing "minutes of an unofficial development committee" and a small bundle of annotated maps was unearthed beneath a uprooted banksia in Kelly’s Bush. Press accounts later referred to initials on the documents matching a then-serving councillor. Its contents have never been made public nor is its current whereabouts publicly known, and some members of the Battlers suspected a coverup of some kind.

With the union green ban in force, A.V. Jennings were eventually forced to sell the land to Hunter's Hill Council, however, by a narrow margin the councillors voted to retain the Residential Zoning. In 1977 the new Premier, Neville Wran, announced that no development would take place at Kelly's Bush. The discovery of radioactive waste on the site raised serious doubts as to its suitability for residential development. A period of silence followed and then in 1983 Neville Wran announced that Kelly's Bush was to be set aside for full public access on a permanent basis. His press release read: "It represents a victory for environmentalists generally. The land will be used to give people access to natural bushland fronting Parramatta River."

The shape of modern Sydney is City of Sydney Labor councillor Meredith Burgmann, who wrote a book on the subject. The movement even inspired overseas activists, including German Petra Kelly, who would eventually form one of the world's first Green political parties.

Mundey and the BLF went on to lead 42 green bans in the early 1970s, holding up billions of dollars' worth of construction.

It took the 13 women 13 years to save Kelly's Bush. When the Wran Government bought the land the women celebrated with a simple bush ceremony and a pot of tea – and invited Jack Mundey, by now their friend for life. Kids still build cubby houses here and roam by foot or bike among the banksias and bracken. Several of the seven dead battlers have had their ashes scattered in the bush.

== Description ==
Kelly's Bush covers 4.8 hectares (12 acres) of bushland on the lower reaches of the Parramatta River in the Sydney Metropolitan Area. It is part of a network of near natural open spaces on the Sydney Harbour waterway system and is the only substantial area of natural bush on the lower Parramatta River. Kelly's Bush is the largest area of near natural bush on the Hunter's Hill peninsula. It is linked directly to Weil Park to the north, Nelson Parade and residential areas to the west, the Parramatta River to the south and residential areas and Woolwich Marina to the east. Kelly's Bush lies on the southerly aspect of the major ridge line of the Hunter's Hill Peninsula, which runs in an east-west direction. There are five major vegetation communities found in Kelly's Bush: eucalyptus (dominant), heath/closed shrub, closed rainforest, banksia/low closed forest and closed scrub/weed areas. The moss Racopilum cuspidigerum is known to occur here.

=== Condition ===
As at 12 January 1999, the park was intact in its 1983 conserved form. The park is substantially intact as an area of remnant bushland.

=== Modifications and dates ===
The site has seen the following modifications:

- 1892: established Smelting Company on two acres, with adjoining seventeen acres of bush to the north designed as buffer to the residential areas and zoned "open space". The Company allowed public access to the foreshore for recreation, through all areas except the actual works area. The condition of the bush fluctuated, depending on the amount of timber being used to fire the smelters.
- 1956: Almost 7 acres of "open space" became known as Weil Park when purchased by Hunter's Hill Council and Cumberland County Council. Bush cleared and a grassed oval created for sporting activities.
- 1967: the Smelting Company works moved to Alexandria and sold to A.V.Jennings - series of DAs - didn't progress.
- SPA then arranged to buy from Jennings 5.6 acres of sloping waterfront bush and abandoned industrial reserve for a "foreshore reserve".
- 1971: Minister for Local Government rezoned the land from Reserved Open Space to Residential.
- 1977: Premier banned development on the site. The discovery of radioactive waste on the site raised serious doubts as to its suitability for residential development.
- 1983: Premier Wran announced that site to be set aside for full public access on a permanent basis.
- 1983–1999: Some improvements have been made, including a carpark, paths, foreshore park, and a viewing platform.

== Heritage listing ==
As at 26 March 1999, Kelly's Bush Park has high local significance as a remnant of natural bushland located on the foreshores of the Parramatta River in Hunters Hill. The site has State significance as the site of the first "green bans" of the 1970s when a group of local residents enlisted the assistance of unions to oppose development of the site.

Kellys Bush Park was listed on the New South Wales State Heritage Register on 2 April 1999.
