= Marika, Hunters Hill =

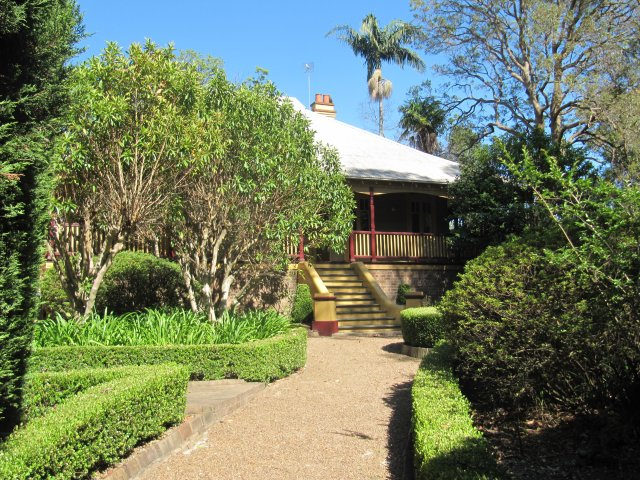

- Location within Sydney Location within Australia
- 33°49′38″S 151°08′15″E
- Location: 46 Ryde Road, Hunters Hill, Municipality of Hunter's Hill, New South Wales, Australia

History
- Built: 1904

Site notes
- Architectural style: Federation

New South Wales Heritage Register
- Official name: Marika; Rye
- Type: State heritage (built)
- Designated: 2 April 1999
- Reference no.: 300
- Type: House
- Category: Residential buildings (private)

Marika is a heritage-listed residence located at 46 Ryde Road, Hunters Hill in the Municipality of Hunter's Hill local government area of New South Wales, Australia. It was built during 1904. It is also known as Rye. It was added to the New South Wales State Heritage Register on 2 April 1999.

== History ==
=== Colonial history of Hunters Hill ===
In 1855 a speculative housing venture of erecting four prefabricated Swiss Cottages at Hunters Hill was underway. In this period Hunters Hill was an established French enclave, with the residence of the French consul located there at "Passy", and much of its early development was constructed by men of French descent. The prefabricated houses were advertised as "four splendid family residences, standing in their own grounds, of about zero point four zero hectares (one acre) each", with "wood and water in abundance".

Beverley Sherry in her study of Hunter Hill notes that this was the first planned group of houses to be built in the municipality, marking the beginning of the garden suburb character of Australia's oldest Garden Suburb The subdivision and garden suburb development occurred in the mid to late nineteenth century, predating the formation of the Garden Suburb movement. The historic development at Hunters Hill was consistently speculative, although some of the subdivisions were undertaken to provide residences for family members.

=== Marika ===
The land on which Marika is built was part of a 30 acres grant made in 1835 to Frederick Augustus Hayne.

He sold to Dr. Leopold Augustus Carter, a dentist, in 1902. The house was listed as Ryde in the Sand's Directory in 1904.

In 1938 Dr. Carter sold to the Caveneagh family who sold it around 1981.

From 1981 to 1983 Marika was restored.

A Permanent Conservation Order was placed over Marika on 2 December 1983. It was transferred to the State Heritage Register on 2 April 1999.

== Description ==
=== Site and grounds ===
Marika is prominently located on a rise and bend corner site of Ryde Road and covers two large blocks of land with remnants of original formal garden pattern layout, including mature trees, flower beds and paths.

=== House ===
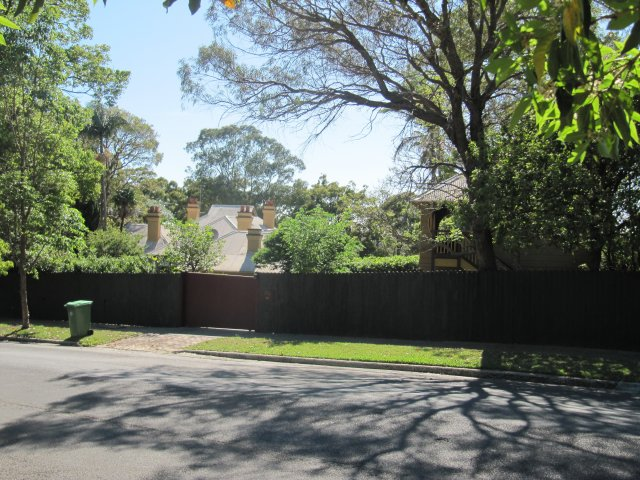
Numerous chimneys

The house is an intact example of the Federation style of architecture. Built of timber and galvanised iron roof. It displays fine quality timber craftsmanship, joinery and detail. Coloured glass panels to the windows and oddrs, timber detailing on the decorative gables, verandah window hoods at the sides and back of house and bay windows to the northern side. Chimney detailing.

=== Condition ===
As at 4 January 2013, its physical condition is excellent.

=== Modifications and dates ===
- 1981–1983: Restoration and renovation
- 1993: Tennis court and garage constructed

== Heritage listing ==
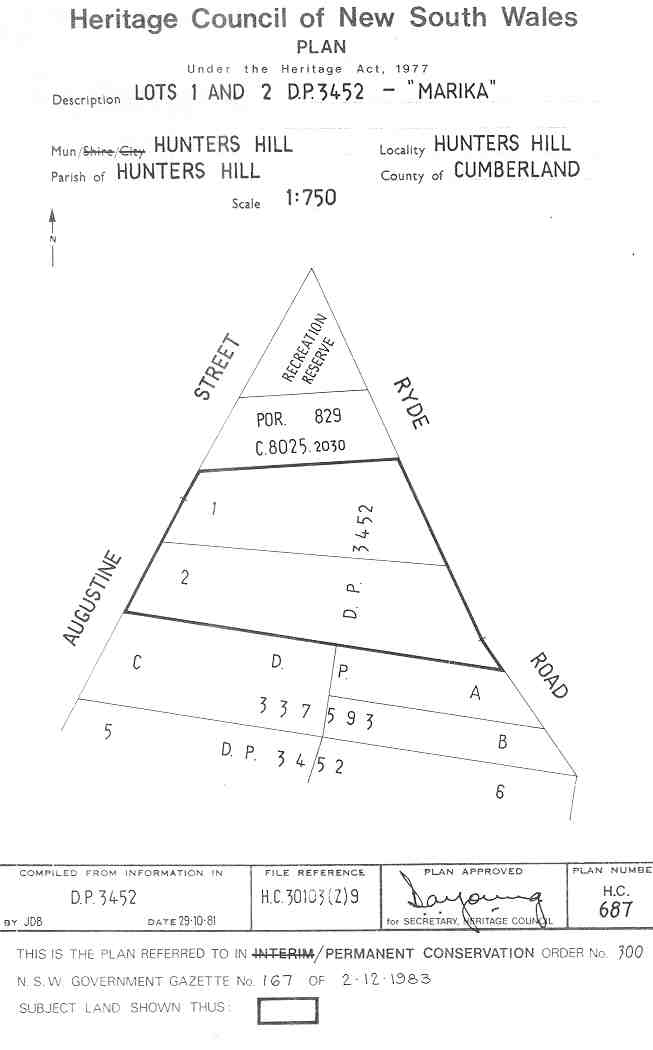
Heritage boundaries

Constructed in 1904, Marika is an outstanding example of the Federation style of architecture. As at 22 January 2013, it continues to display fine quality timber craftsmanship and joinery. Reputedly built by a tradesman joiner it exhibits quality construction and detail rarely equalled. It is prominently located on a rise and bend corner site of Ryde Road and covers two large blocks of land with remnants of original garden layout, including mature trees, flower beds and paths.

Marika was listed on the New South Wales State Heritage Register on 2 April 1999.

== See also ==
- Australian residential architectural styles
