= Municipality of Hunter's Hill =

- Local government area
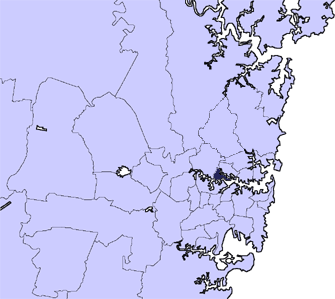
- Location in Metropolitan Sydney

- Interactive map of Municipality of Hunter's Hill
- Coordinates: 33°49′S 151°08′E
- Country: Australia
- State: New South Wales
- Region: Metropolitan Sydney
- Established: 12 March 1861
- Council seat: Town Hall, Hunters Hill

Government
  - Mayor: Zac Miles
  - State electorate: Lane Cove
  - Federal division: Bennelong

Area
  - Total: 5.7 km^{2} (2.2 sq mi)

Population
  - Totals: 13,559 (2021 census); 13,750 (2023 est.)
  - Density: 2,379/km^{2} (6,160/sq mi)
- Postcode: 2110
- County: Australia
- Website: Municipality of Hunter's Hill
LGAs around Municipality of Hunter's Hill
Ryde	Lane Cove	Lane Cove
Ryde	Municipality of Hunter's Hill	Lane Cove
Canada Bay	Canada Bay	Inner West

The Municipality of Hunter's Hill or Hunter's Hill Council is a local government area in Northern Sydney, in the state of New South Wales, Australia. The municipality was first proclaimed in 1861, which includes the suburbs of Hunters Hill, Woolwich, Huntleys Point, Tarban, Henley and part of Gladesville. As at the 2021 census, the Municipality had an estimated population of 13,559. At 5.7 square kilometres (2.2 sq mi), the Municipality is, by area, the smallest local government area in New South Wales and its boundaries remain mostly unaltered since its establishment in 1861. The mayor of Hunters Hill since 4 December 2021 is Zac Miles.

== Suburbs and localities in the local government area ==
Suburbs and localities in the Municipality of Hunters Hill are:

- Gladesville (parts are located within the City of Ryde)
- Henley
- Hunters Hill
- Huntleys Cove
- Huntleys Point
- Woolwich

== Council history ==
A 2015 review of local government boundaries by the NSW Government Independent Pricing and Regulatory Tribunal recommended that the Municipality of Hunter's Hill merge with adjoining councils. The government proposed a merger of the Hunter's Hill, Lane Cove and Ryde Councils to form a new council with an area of 57 square kilometres (22 sq mi) and support a population of approximately 164,000. In July 2017, the Berejiklian government decided to abandon the forced merger of the Hunter's Hill, Lane Cove and Ryde local government areas along with several other proposed forced mergers.

== Demographics ==
At the 2016 census there were 13,199 people resident in the Hunter's Hill local government area, of these 49.9 per cent were male and 50.1 per cent were female. Aboriginal and Torres Strait Islander people made up 0.6 per cent of the population; significantly below the NSW and Australian averages of 2.9 and 2.8 per cent respectively. The median age of people in the Municipality of Hunter's Hill was 43 years; significantly higher than the national median of 38 years. Children aged 0 – 14 years made up 19.0 per cent of the population and people aged 65 years and over made up 21.6 per cent of the population. Of people in the area aged 15 years and over, 52.7 per cent were married and 9.3 per cent were either divorced or separated.

Population growth in the Municipality of Hunter's Hill between the 2001 census and the 2006 census was 5.34 per cent and in the subsequent five years to the 2011 census, population decreased by 0.20 per cent. At the 2016 census, the population in the Municipality decreased by 0.12 per cent. When compared with total population growth of Australia for the same period, being 8.8 per cent, population growth in the Hunter's Hill local government area was significantly lower than the national average. The median weekly income for residents within the Municipality of Hunter's Hill was significantly higher than the national average.

Selected historical census data for Hunter's Hill local government area
Census year		2001	2006	2011	2016
Population	Estimated residents on census night	12,570	▲13,241	▼13,215	▼13,199
Population	LGA rank in terms of size within New South Wales		86th	▲82nd	▲79th
Population	% of New South Wales population			0.19%	▼0.18%
Population	% of Australian population	0.07%	0.07%	▼0.06%	0.06%
Population	Estimated ATSI population on census night	44	▲72	▼54	▲81
Population	% of ATSI population to residents	0.4%	▲0.5%	▼0.4%	▲0.6%
Cultural and language diversity					
Ancestry, top responses	English			23.8%	▼22.4%
Ancestry, top responses	Australian			22.8%	▼20.0%
Ancestry, top responses	Irish			10.8%	▲11.0%
Ancestry, top responses	Scottish			6.4%	▲6.6%
Ancestry, top responses	Chinese			n/c	▲6.1%
Language, top responses (other than English)	Mandarin	n/c	▲1.5%	▲2.0%	▲3.2%
Language, top responses (other than English)	Cantonese	2.2%	▼2.1%	▲2.5%	▼2.4%
Language, top responses (other than English)	Italian	2.8%	▼2.6%	▼2.5%	▼2.1%
Language, top responses (other than English)	Greek	2.3%	▼2.2%	▼2.1%	▼1.9%
Language, top responses (other than English)	Arabic	0.7%	▼ n/c	▲0.8%	0.8%
Religious affiliation					
Religious affiliation, top responses	Catholic	36.5%	▲36.6%	▲37.5%	▼35.5%
Religious affiliation, top responses	No religion, so described	12.8%	▲14.6%	▲18.3%	▲24.4%
Religious affiliation, top responses	Anglican	21.5%	▼19.8%	▼17.9%	▼14.1%
Religious affiliation, top responses	Not stated	n/c	n/c	n/c	▲8.1%
Religious affiliation, top responses	Eastern Orthodox	3.8%	▼3.7%	▲3.9%	3.9%
Median weekly incomes					
Personal income	Median weekly personal income		A$704	A$820	A$977
Personal income	% of Australian median income		151.1%	142.1%	147.6%
Family income	Median weekly family income		A$1,815	A$2,715	A$3,301
Family income	% of Australian median income		176.7%	183.3%	190.4%
Household income	Median weekly household income		A$2,506	A$2,178	A$2,467
Household income	% of Australian median income		214.0%	176.5%	171.6%

== Council ==
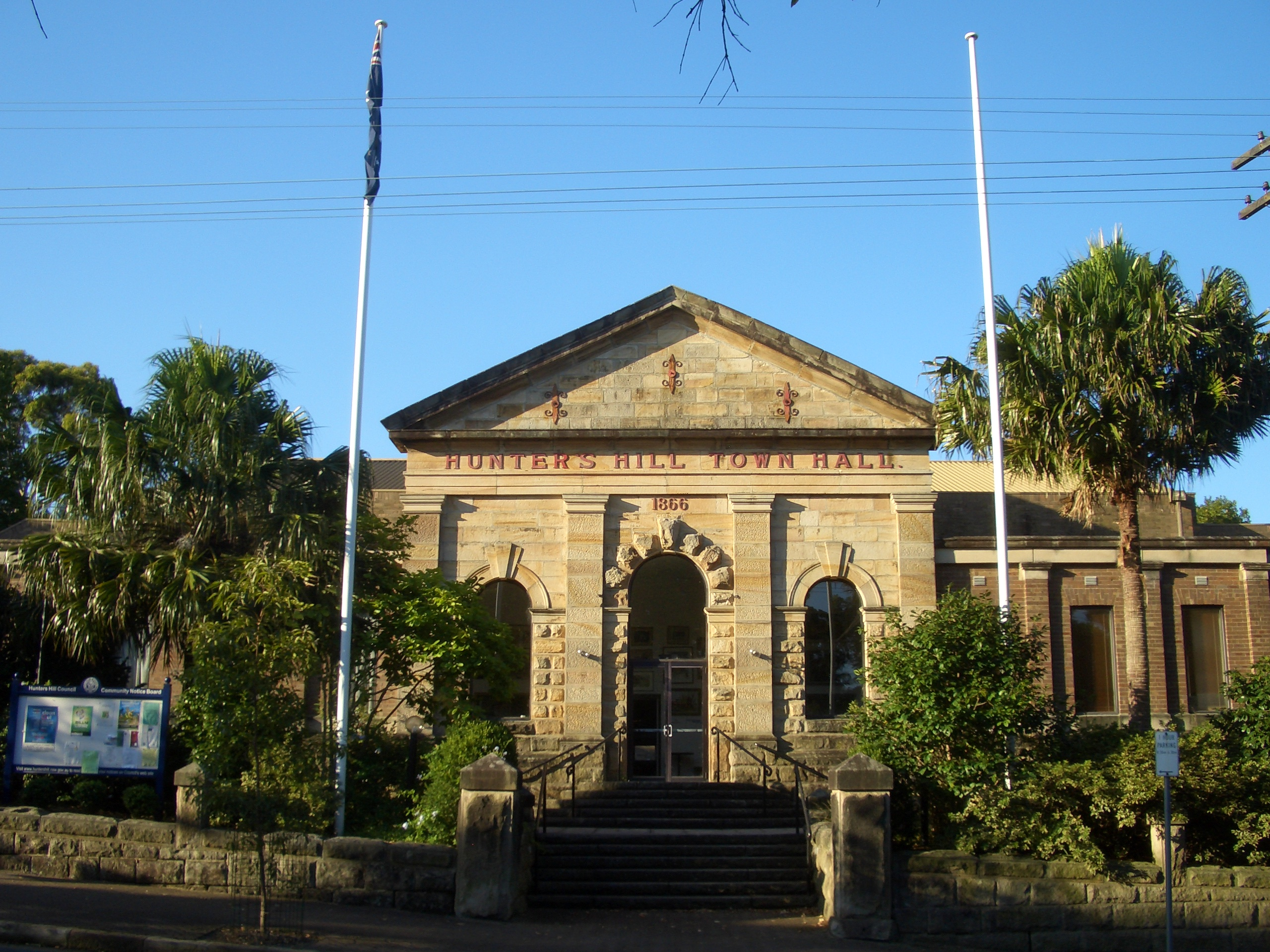
The Hunters Hill Town Hall, located at 22 Alexandra Street, has been the council seat since 1866.

=== Current composition and election method ===
A map of the two wards, showing party representation as of the 2021 local elections.

Hunters Hill Municipal Council is composed of seven councillors, including the mayor, for a fixed four-year term of office. The Mayor is directly elected while the six other Councillors are elected proportionally as two separate wards, each electing three Councillors. The most recent election was held on 4 December 2021, and the makeup of the Council is as follows:

Party	Councillors
Independents	4
Liberal Party of Australia	3
Total	7

The Council, elected in 2021, in order of election by ward, is:

Ward	Councillor	Party	Notes
Mayor	Zac Miles	Liberal	Mayor 2021–present; South Ward Councillor 2012–2021 (Unaligned until 2017).
North Ward	Ross Williams	Independent	Elected 1987–1999, 2017–present; Mayor 1989–1993, 2020–2021; Deputy Mayor 2017–2018.
North Ward	Julia Prieston	Liberal	
North Ward	Elizabeth Krassoi	Independent	Elected 2017; Deputy Mayor 2022–date.
South Ward	Tatyana Virgara	Liberal	
South Ward	Jim Sanderson	Independent	Elected 2017; Deputy Mayor 2019–2021.
South Ward	Richard Quinn	Independent	Mayor 2012–2017.

== Election results ==
=== 2024 ===
2024 New South Wales local elections: Hunter's Hill
Party	Votes	%	Swing	Seats	Change
Liberal	4,709	56.4%	+17.9%	4	▲1
Team Ross	2,056	24.6%	+9.3%	1	Steady
Hunter's Hill Independents	1,582	19.0%	+8.7%	1	(Note: Hunter's Hill Independents candidate Jim Sanderson was elected as an unaffiliated Independent in 2021, but lost his seat to party leader Marc Lane)
Formal votes	8,347	96.82%			
Informal votes	294	3.18%			
Total	8,621	100.00%		15	

=== 2021 ===
2021 New South Wales local elections: Hunter's Hill
Party	Votes	%	Swing	Seats	Change
Independent	3,372	41.0		3	
Liberal	3,171	38.5	+2.1	3	
Team Ross	1,260	15.3		1	
Greens	431	5.2	+5.2	0	Steady
Formal votes	8,234	96.33			
Informal votes	314	3.67			
Total	8,548	100.00			

== Heritage listings ==
The Municipality of Hunter's Hill has a number of heritage-listed sites, including:

- Gladesville, Manning Road: The Priory, Gladesville
- Hunters Hill, 38-40 Alexandra Street: Vienna, Hunters Hill
- Hunters Hill, 12 Crescent Street: Milthorpe, Hunters Hill
- Hunters Hill, 14 Crescent Street: Hestock
- Hunters Hill, Ferry Street: The Garibaldi
- Hunters Hill, Nelson Parade: Kellys Bush Park
- Hunters Hill, 46 Ryde Road: Marika, Hunters Hill
- Hunters Hill, 2 Yerton Avenue: The Chalet

== Coat of arms ==
Coat of arms of the Municipality of Hunter's Hill
Notes Designed by Town Clerk Bill Phipson and local artist Barrie Drake, the design of a coat of arms was investigated by the Council first in 1978, and then in 1985. In August 1985, the Council voted to spend $5,000 on its arms design and application to the College of Arms. The final design of grant was made by the Garter, Clarenceux, and Norroy & Ulster kings of arms. Adopted 1 December 1989 Crest Issuant from an Ancient Crown Or a stylised representation of a Fig Tree proper Helm A closed Helmet affronté, with a wreath Argent and Sable Escutcheon Azure three Bars wavy Argent on a Pile between two Oars pilewise Or blades in chief each per pale Gules and Azure a Bugle Horn mouth to the sinister Vert stringed and garnished Gules Supporters Two Ibis proper their breasts against the Shield Compartment Seven Blocks of Sandstone ranged in two tiers three and four also proper Motto Moocooboola Other elements Mantled Azure doubled Argent Badge Upon seven Blocks of Sandstone ranged in two tiers—three and four Or a Bugle Horn mouth to the sinister Vert stringed and garnished Gules Symbolism A Hunting-horn is taken from the family crest of Captain John Hunter, the second Governor of New South Wales who commanded the First Fleet ship HMS Sirius, and whose name was adopted by the area. The blue waves represent the Lane Cove and Parramatta rivers, and the two oars – in the colours of St Joseph’s College – connect to the rivers. The helm is topped with a wreath of black and white to represent local sporting colours, and a gold crown of Fleur-de-lis to commemorate the history of Hunter's Hill as "The French Village". From the crown grows the Port Jackson fig tree that is common in the Sydney Harbour basin and echoes the tree used in the badge of Hunters Hill High School. Two Australian white ibis, which are aquatic birds, represent the local native fauna. The compartment comprises blocks of Sydney sandstone, which forms the basis of the Hunter's Hill peninsula and was quarried for many of the heritage buildings in the area. The motto, "Moocooboola", is derived from a Wallumedegal Aboriginal word for the local area which is translated as "the meeting of the waters".

== See also ==
- List of local government areas in New South Wales
