= Mental Health Review Tribunal of New South Wales =

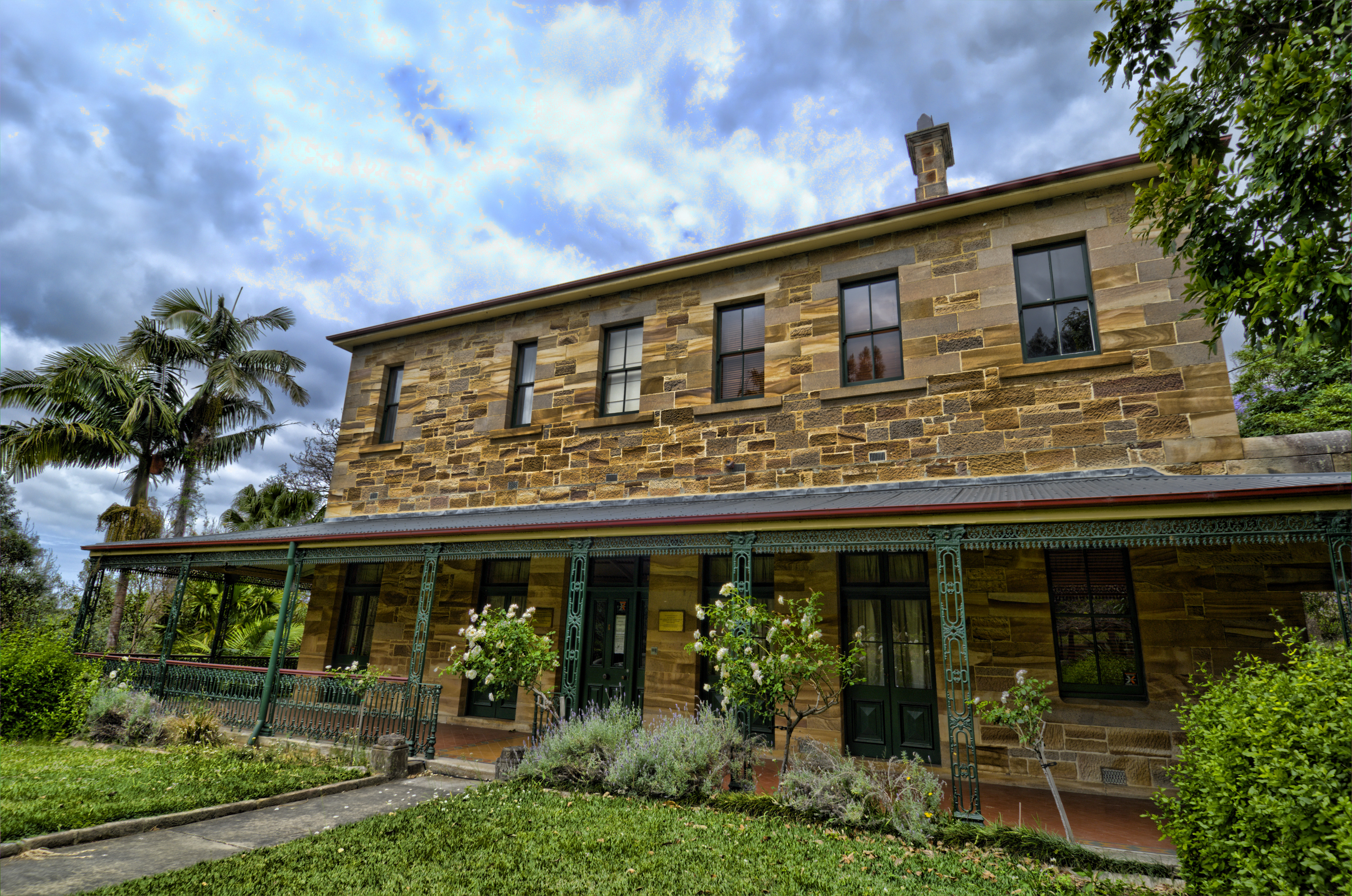
- Part of the Gladesville Hospital complex, now home to the Mental Health Review Tribunal
- Established: 3 September 1990
- Jurisdiction: New South Wales, Australia
- Location: Building 40 Digby Road, Gladesville Hospital, Gladesville, Sydney
- Authorised by: Parliament of New South Wales via the Mental Health Act 2007 (NSW) and the Mental Health (Forensic Provisions) Act 1990 (NSW)
- Appeals to: NSW Civil and Administrative Tribunal; Supreme Court of New South Wales
- Website: www.mhrt.nsw.gov.au

President
- Currently: His Honour Judge Paul Lakatos SC
- Since: 21 March 2019

The Mental Health Review Tribunal of New South Wales is a specialist tribunal dealing with mental health issues in New South Wales, a state of Australia. It has exclusive jurisdiction in terms of most mental health issues, although it may share jurisdiction on some issue with other courts, such as the Supreme Court of New South Wales. The tribunal came into existence on 3 September 1990.

== Constitution ==
The tribunal is established under the Mental Health Act 2007 (NSW) and the Mental Health (Forensic Provisions) Act 1990 (NSW). The acts give the tribunal a wide range of powers deal with the treatment and care of people with a mental illness.

The Governor of New South Wales may appoint a president of the tribunal. The president is a full-time position and the office-holder is expected to devote the whole of their time to the role. The current President, since June 2012, is Professor Daniel Howard. The governor may also appoint deputy presidents of the tribunal. These roles may be full-time or part-time. At present, there are two deputy presidents appointed. Presidents and deputy presidents must either be lawyers or former judicial officers.

The governor may also appoint members of the tribunal. These members can be either full-time or part-time members, although the tendency is to appoint part-time members. Members are usually appointed for a one-year term. Members are chosen because of their experience in mental health issues, and may be psychiatrists or persons with a suitable qualification or experience in the area. As at 31 December 2005 there were 103 part-time members, comprising 33 legal members, 31 psychiatrists and 39 other suitably qualified members.

== Jurisdiction ==
The tribunal determines cases under the Mental Health Act 2007 (NSW) and the Mental Health (Forensic Provisions) Act 1990 (NSW). It may also have jurisdiction to deal with cases under other laws. The tribunal has jurisdiction in respect of:

- the release or disposition of persons acquitted of crimes by reason of mental illness;
- whether a person is fit for further trial after a jury has found the person unfit for trial;
- reviewing the cases of detained patients (both civil and forensic) to determine whether they should continue to be detained;
- hearing appeals against a medical superintendent's refusal to discharge a patient;
- making, varying and revoking community treatment and community counselling orders;
- determining applications for treatments and surgery on detained patients; and
- making orders for financial management where people are unable to make competent decisions for

themselves because of psychiatric disability.

In certain circumstances, an appeal may be lodged against the decision of the tribunal in either the NSW Civil and Administrative Tribunal or the Supreme Court of New South Wales.

== Hearings ==
The Tribunal conducts hearings in hospitals and community health centres throughout the Sydney, Illawarra, and Hunter regions, and also in Goulburn and Orange. The Tribunal conducts hearings for people living outside these areas either by videoconference or by telephone.

A person may have a lawyer to represent him or her at a hearing. In some cases, non-lawyers can represent a person with the permission of the tribunal.

In 2005 the Tribunal conducted 9,389 hearings.

== See also ==
- List of New South Wales courts and tribunals
