= The Priory, Gladesville =

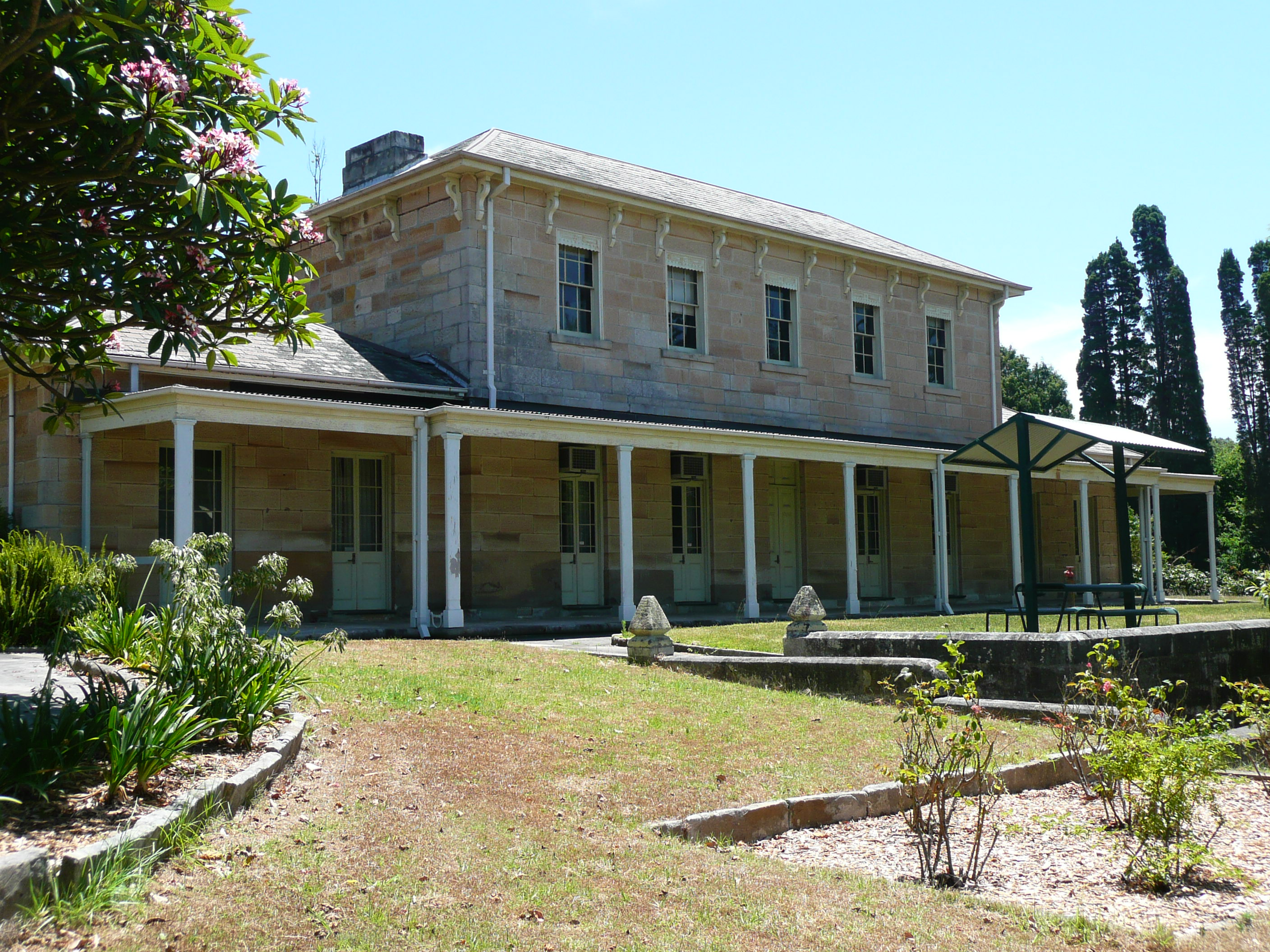
- The Priory, pictured in January 2009

- Location within Sydney Location within Australia
- 33°50′14″S 151°08′22″E
- Location: Manning Road, Gladesville, Municipality of Hunter's Hill, New South Wales, Australia

History
- Built: 1847–1874
- Built for: The Marist Fathers in Australia

Site notes
- Architects: Main part (1857): William Weaver; Henry Hardie Kemp
- Architectural style: Palladian or Old Colonial Regency

New South Wales Heritage Register
- Official name: The Priory; Gladesville Hospital; Gladesville Asylum; The Priory and curtilage
- Type: State heritage (landscape)
- Designated: 3 December 2004
- Reference no.: 1720
- Type: Historic Landscape
- Category: Landscape – Cultural
- Builders: Thomas Stubbs, the Marist Brothers and Thomas Salter

The Priory is a heritage-listed former farm, mental health facility, convent and homestead and now building, vacant building and proposed community arts uses at Manning Road, Gladesville in the Municipality of Hunter's Hill local government area of New South Wales, Australia. The main part of The Priory was designed by William Weaver and Henry Hardie Kemp, and built from 1847 to 1874 by Thomas Stubbs, The Marist Fathers in Australia, and Thomas Salter. It is also known as Gladesville Hospital, Gladesville Asylum and The Priory and curtilage. It was added to the New South Wales State Heritage Register on 3 December 2004.

== History ==
=== Indigenous history ===
At the time of European contact the Kelly's bush area was inhabited by the Wal Umedegal Clan who spoke the Guringai language. They lived primarily on fish and shellfish, supplementing their diet when necessary with vegetables, marsupials, birds and grubs. They were also frequently observed firing the scrub both to facilitate access to the foreshore and to flush out game. Very little is known of their social structure and religious beliefs.

=== Colonial history ===
Captain John Hunter (1737–1821) of the Sirius, charted Sydney Harbour in 1788. On 28 January 1788 he wrote in his journal: "A few days after my arrival with the transports in Port Jackson, I set off with a six-oared boat and a small boat, intending to make as good a survey of the harbour as circumstances would admit: I took to my assistance Mr Bradley, the first lieutenant, Mr Keltie, the master, and a young gentleman of the quarter-deck (midshipman Henry Waterhouse)." Hunter's meticulous chart shows 30 depth soundings around the peninsula bounded by the Parramatta and Lane Cove rivers. Hunter was Governor of the Colony from 1795–1800. He is commemorated in the name of Hunters Hill.

In 1855 a speculative housing venture of erecting four prefabricated Swiss Cottages at Hunters Hill was underway. In this period Hunters Hill was an established French enclave, with the residence of the French consul located there at "Passy", and much of its early development was constructed by men of French descent. The prefabricated houses were advertised as "four splendid family residences, standing in their own grounds, of about 1 acres each", with "wood and water in abundance".

Beverley Sherry in her study of Hunter Hill notes that this was the first planned group of houses to be built in the municipality, marking the beginning of the garden suburb character of Australia's oldest Garden Suburb. The subdivision and garden suburb development occurred in the mid to late nineteenth century, predating the formation of the Garden Suburb movement. The historic development at Hunters Hill was consistently speculative, although some of the subdivisions were undertaken to provide residences for family members.

=== Thomas Stubbs, 1835–1847 ===
Thomas Stubbs purchased two allotments of land at the head of Tarban Creek in 1835. This land adjoined the first land grants, part of the Eastern Farms, towards the western end of the present Municipality of Hunters Hill. Stubbs built a sandstone far, house, outbuildings and began farming his seven point three hectares (eighteen acres), now called 'the Stubbs Wing'.

=== Marist Fathers, 1847–1874 ===
The Marists had arrived in Australia in December 1837, after establishing mission stations on two South-west Pacific islands, Wallis and Futuna.

In 1847 Stubbs sold his two blocks to Fr. Jean-Louis Rocher of the Marist Fathers who were looking to establish a base for missionaries in the South Pacific. The Fathers built a new building on the site in 1857 which they called "Villa Maria", moving in immediately and this forming the base for the Marist Pacific Missions which incorporated part of and extended Stubbs original sandstone farmhouse. The new building was designed by architect-engineer, William Weaver in a Palladian or Old Colonial Regency style.

Weaver worked in New South Wales from 1851 to 1864. He served as Colonial Architect from 1855–56, then set up in private practice, aged 28, at 25 Pitt Street, Sydney. The colonial economy was prospering, the new Sydney Railway was running as far as Liverpool and suburban development encouraged speculative building. Villa Maria (now known as the Priory) is one surviving example of Weaver's first year in private practice. It was commenced in February 1857, completed that November at a cost of 1685 pounds and built by local stonemasons. The long eastern front with stone flagged verandah has a fine and unaltered Georgian symmetry favoured by Weaver for his residence designs. Another of his favourite features evident in Villa Maria is the extension of the sides to the back of the building creating a courtyard. The plan incorporated a pre-1847 cottage as a northern wing. Accounts signed by Weaver indicate a smooth and rapid progress of construction.

The renamed Villa Maria reorientated the original farmhouse towards the harbour, taking full advantage of the site and view. The Marist Fathers continued to farm the land and, amongst numerous other activities, extended Stubb's vineyards.

The property contained vast orchards, vineyards and gardens and provided rest and recuperation for the Marist Fathers' South Pacific missionaries. Goods and materials were bought and stored here to supply the Pacific Island mission stations. The house was also used for rest and recuperation for missionaries exhausted from their work on the island mission stations.

During its period as "Villa Maria", a wooden chapel on the site was the resting place of the body of St Peter Chanel, Proto-martyr of Oceania from 7 May 1849 till some time before February 1850 when it was taken to France. Fr Peter (Pierre) Chanel met his martyrdom on the island of Futuna, on 28 April 1841; he was canonised in 1954. It was also the residence of Blessed Giovanni Mazzucconi on his arrival in the region in 1852 and again immediately before his martyrdom, by New Guinea Islanders, in 1855. These associations make the Priory a place of exceptional importance both for Australian Catholics and for Australians of French or Italian background.

The establishment of the South Sea mission house by the Marist Fathers was the first presence of French settlers in the Municipality of Hunters Hill. From 1853, however, the Fathers began acquiring land on the other side of Tarban Creek.

The small size of available dwellings on the property, and large numbers of people sometimes accommodated there, made some kind of expansion essential. There was sandstone on the property, which could be quarried and one of the Marist Brothers, Gennade Rolland was an able stonemason and iron worker, which would make the work economical. An impressive two-storey stone structure was built in 1857, the architects being Weaver and Henry Hardie Kemp (1859–1946). This stands at right angles to the original dwelling.

It appears that the Marist fathers had moved to another newly constructed "Villa Maria" (in Hunters Hill) by 1864 and that site remains in their ownership to the present day.

In 1862 an attempt had been made to sell the original Villa Maria to the government for the (Gladesville) Mental Hospital, which failed. It was interesting as an attempt, because the property was eventually sold to the state for this purpose many years later, and not by the Marists. They retained the property for some years, using it as a convent. Finally they sold it to Thomas Salter in 1874, rather cheaply.

=== Thomas Salter, 1874–1888 ===
Although the Brothers were unable to immediately sell the old mission house upon their removal, by 1874 Thomas Salter had acquired the house and farmland for A£2,000. He renamed the house "The Priory" and added his own L-shaped, picturesque gothic extension, now called 'the Salter Wing', added c. 1875, behind Weaver's Palladian front on the north west. A map of 1885 shows the layout of Salter's land. It addition to the original kitchen, the Old Mission House and extensive stone terracing, the map shows the footprint of a shed, bush house, latrines, out house, tennis court, stables and coach houses. The position of the garden, poultry yard and cultivation paddock are clearly marked.

=== Gladesville Hospital, 1888 ===
When Thomas Salter moved from The Priory to Brynault in Mount Street in 1887 he sold the land to Gladesville Mental Hospital, the earliest psychiatric hospital on the Australian mainland.

The Priory became the first hospital building to be utilised on the Riverglade Campus, the area of the hospital on the northern side of Victoria Road. For more than 60 years the surrounding land was farmed by patients for the production of fruit and vegetables for hospital use. Land reclaimed along the Tarban Creek shoreline extended the arable area. A Metropolitan Sewerage & Drainage Board map of 1928 shows, in addition to the kitchen, shed, latrines, out house and Old Mission House identified on the map of 1885, a new large stables building to the west at the rear of the house and the cow bails building alongside the kitchen. The Priory is labelled the dairy on this map.

1887–1947: the surrounding land was farmed by patients for the production of fruit and vegetables for hospital use. Land reclaimed along Tarban Creek shoreline extended the arable area.

=== Twentieth Century changes ===
A 1928 map shows a large stables building to the south at the rear of the house and the cow bails building alongside the kitchen. The Priory is labelled "The Dairy" on this map. The western verandah form varies from that on the 1885 survey plan and it appears a single storey pavilion of the Weaver extension may have been extended to the west.

Little change occurred over the site in the early 20th century. Land below the Mission House was used as a golf course in the 1920s and 1930s, and the house istelsf used as the Ladies' Club House.

The main evidence of war-time occupancy of Gladesville Hospital – is the c. 1942 air raid shelter (near the vegetable gardens, later used as a garden storage shed) and an ablution block, built more recently and the only intrusive structure on site. The air raid shelter was for patients and staff at the hospital and was cut into the terrace alongside the Weaver wing's main front.

1950s changes included: alterations to The Priory building; demolition of the Mission House in 1952, conversion of the cow shed into a store and cleaning room, following fires in 1954 and 1958; and removal of Salter's stone garden store in 1955.

1967 NSW Public Works Department changes: 1966 and 1967 plans show modifications made during the 1967 NSW Public Works Department maintenance program. Toilets to the rear of the pavilion of the Weaver wing were removed to convert the space to a boiler room and a tank and stand erected to the south. These have since been removed. A brick extension, with a clip-lock roof, was added to the south of the boiler room to provide a new shower and toilet facilities. This necessitated excavation and building the retaining wall to the west.

Two of the windows in the rear wall of the Weaver pavilion were filled in and the third converted to a doorway to the new extension. Fire escape doors were inserted into window openings in the west wall of the Weaver wing and the south wall of the Salter wing, and metal stairs attached. These were later removed and the windows reconstructed.

A commercial kitchen was installed, c. 1967, at the western end of the Salter wing. This required removal of walls, fireplaces, floors and joinery. The fitout of the kitchen was removed in a later upgrade of the house, and the servery between kitchen and dining room filled in and the surface re-finished. A building maintenance program in 1967 saw a number of modifications made: various alterations to front and rear verandahs, removal or blocking (up) of chimneys and repair and replacement of joinery. Internal finishes such as wall and ceiling plaster were changed. A timber-framed tank stand was built on the southern elevation (later removed) and there were excavations and rebuilding of retaining walls. The grounds were also altered in this period: earlier, in 1889, mud flats at Tarban Creek were filled to provide more agricultural land. This area was cultivated continuously until the 1950s. In 1957, approximately 100 tons of soil from the vegetable garden was removed to build a sports oval on the southern side of Victoria Road. The citrus orchard, possibly remaining in the Marist Brothers period, was buried by fill in the mid-1970s and 1980s. These extensive episodes of filling have altered the landscape of The Priory and Tarban Creek.

More recently, The Priory had been a ward for patients who although rehabilitated, still required supervision. Nearby vegetable gardens still supplied the hospital and were tended by patients.

=== Riverglade Hospital, 1975–85 ===
In 1975 the Asylum area north of Victoria Road was renamed the Riverglade Hospital and given over to care for the developmentally-disabled. The Priory itself formally operated as patient accommodation until 1985, known as Ward 2. The last few patients moved out by the end of 1985. It was then occupied by NSW Government's Mental Health Review Tribunal offices and staff. Further repairs and alterations ahead of the new occupation included removal of ceilings and cornices to the Stubbs and Salter wings, removal of the whole roof slating to the Stubbs wing (in 1985), replacement of external doors with modern designs, replacement of door hardware and removal of original flagging to the northern (Stubbs wing) porch.

1981 drawings show planned changes to The Priory that don't appear to have been made. The west facade of the Weaver wing may have had additional openings previously. It is possible that NSW Department of Public Works had documentary evidence at this time relating to a former balcony and rear openings, which it planned to reinstate.

1994 Subdivision, rezoning and future adaptive reuse: The lot boundary of The Priory was reduced in 1994 when the property was subdivided by the State Government. The Priory on Lot 1 of DP823988 was retained in Government use and an area surrounding it to the north, east and south was sold into private ownership. The Priory continued use as offices until the Mental Health Review Tribunal vacated in 1/2003.

The State Government sold the land surrounding the Priory, including the subject site, to private developers in 1994. The subdivision of the larger number of sites containing the entire curtilage of the Priory was approved by the Crown Lands Office and Hunters Hill Council in the same year. The boundaries of the subject site were established in a subdivision approved by Hunters Hill Council in 1997. This boundary followed the boundary set by Council for "heritage conservation" in its Hunters Hill Local Environmental Plan 18 (LEP), gazetted in 1993. The LEP zones the area of the Priory as "heritage conservation" which permits any form of development on the land compatible with the heritage significance of the listed item 309 – the Priory and the Priory curtilage.

To ascertain what is compatible with the heritage significance of the site, the former owners, Keppel Land, sought heritage advice from consultants Godden Mackay Logan in 1999. This initial investigation into appropriate development options for the site recommended that residential use would be compatible in heritage terms with the heritage significance of the Priory, provided that its siting, form and scale does not detract from the significance and setting of the Priory.

In 2003 the Department of Health vacated the site and it was uninhabited for some time. A development application for an apartment building concentrated development into the south-west corner of the Priory's former site to minimise the adverse impacts on land within the SHR curtilage. The application included a detached house within an area enclosed by tall hedges. More than half of that site will be dedicated to the public as a reserve. The applicant consulted with the Heritage Office in selecting sites as part of the process of listing the Priory on the State Heritage Register in 2004. Following public concerns the apartment building was reduced by one storey (i.e. now of four stories) eliminating 2 units. All but two of the trees were kept and the detached house was reduced in height. In 2006 development approval was given for construction of town houses south-west of The Priory, on Lot 201 DP878383. Land immediately north and east of The Priory has been dedicated for use as public open space. The Health Department transferred their ownership of the site to the Department of Lands and on 1 November 2007 the then Minister Tony Kelly MLC, added The Priory and its surrounds to the Riverglade Reserve (R100263) Trust, administered by Hunters Hill Council.

=== Preservation and community use ===
On 1 November 2007 Kelly, as Minister for Lands, transferred the care, control and management of The Priory and its grounds to Hunters Hill Council to remain in public hands. On the same day the Mayor, Cr. Susan Hoopmann launched The Priory Preservation and Restoration Trust, which manages the property and operates a public fund for tax-deductible donations from the community towards its restoration, preservation and embellishment. Council intends that The Priory develop into a cultural and heritage hub for the wider community and the people of Hunters Hill. It is envisaged this will comprise art and museum space, meeting facilities, gardens for weddings and other events, in addition to a commercial facility providing coffee and other refreshments.

== Description ==
=== The Main building ===
The Priory's main building is built of locally quarried sandstone and has slate roofs and consists of three parts. The main part (fronting southeast) was designed as a marine villa by William Weaver. It is Palladian in form with a two-storey central block and single storey wings, the north-eastern wing being longer than the southern. The wing on the northeast incorporates the earlier stone cottage built by Thomas Stubbs and, at the northern end of this, Thomas Salter added an L-shaped picturesque Gothic structure.

=== Outbuildings and landscape ===
The main building is set on a sandstone terrace and flanked to the south and east and north by further sandstone and in places brick retaining wall terracing, some rectilinear, some curving.

The surrounding landscape includes a number of former outbuildings, structures and their remnants. The stone kitchen is located to the north, stone terraces define the former garden, a brick air raid shelter is located south of the main building. Also to the south is the footprint of a former building described as "latrine" on an early plan.

Archaeological remains include the cow bail site, the stables, the turning circle and road layout.

Evidence of original plantings exists in the significant clumps of trees to the east, north and west of the Priory building Main tree species include: camphor laurels (Cinnamomum camphora) form a street planting avenue west on Salter Street; a number of Lombardy poplars (Populus nigra "Italica") west and north-west of the main building lining old drives/approaches; also lining the main approach north of the main building are a number of Mediterranean cypresses (Cupressus sempervirens), two funeral cypress (C. funebris) at the base of a flight of steps off the terrace to the north (driveway); and some native cypress pines (Callitris rhomboidea/columellaris) – a line of this same tree is also uphill and south of the main building.

East and north-east of the main building and below a sandstone curved terrace are a number of pollarded jacarandas (J. mimosifolia); a red ash (Alphitonia excelsa); a Canary Island date palm (Phoenix canariensis), a number of sweet pittosporum (P. undulatum) and creeping fig on the sandstone wall.

Two silky oak trees (Grevillea robusta) are south and west of the main building. A moderate-sized Hill's fig (Ficus microcarpa 'Hillii') is on a grass terrace west of the main building. North of the main building and below the driveway are two "English" oaks (Quercus robur). The site has several Canary Island date palms (north, north-east and east of the main building).

A number of trees appear to be seedlings from bird-dropped seed, either growing in retaining walls or below them, or terraces. These include to the south and south-west of the main building two large Ficus rubiginosa (Port Jackson fig) growing adventitiously on sandstone retaining walls. A number of sweet pittosporum are around the main building and its lawn margins. Other seedling Port Jackson figs are growing up other trees as epiphytes, from bird-dropped seed.

A large brush box (Lophostemon confertus) is on a terrace south of the main building.

A steel pipe arbour and a circular flat lawn area are west of the main building. On the arbour is a yellow Mrs Banks' rose (Rosa banksiae 'Aurea'). Two small bottlebrush trees (Callistemon sp.) are on a lower grass terrace west of the main building. These appear to date from the 1970s or 1980s.

A screen of crepe myrtles (Lagerstroemia indica) are south of the main building, appearing to have been planted as screens. Hedges also form part of this southern and south-western part of the site, with Cape honeysuckle/tecoma (Tecomaria capensis) and Cape plumbago (P. capensis) being prominent on retaining walls and property boundaries here.

=== Condition ===
As at 17 June 2003, The Priory building was in good condition with its surrounding landscape having high archaeological potential. Archaeological remains include the cow bail site, the stables (excavated since 2008), the turning circle and road layout.

The nearby freshwater creek flowing into the harbour is likely to have been regularly visited by Aboriginal people in the past. Any proposal for services ducts across Tarban Creek would need to be considered in relation to impacts on potential maritime archaeology.

The immediate surrounding landscape of this site contains a number of former outbuildings, structures and remnants with the potential to yield further information about how the site was used by each of its past occupants. These structures include former kitchen, stone terraces that define the garden layout, air raid shelter and footings to the "latrine" or garden building. The immediate surrounding landscape contains a number of archaeological sites (including cow bail site, stables, turning circle and road layout) all able to yield further information about the use of site past occupants. Evidence of original plantings exists in significant clumps of trees to the east, north and west of the Priory. These provide important information about the evolution and layout of the formal garden and surrounding landscape over time. Former outbuildings, archaeological sites and original plantings have value in interpreting the use of the Priory and the potential to yield information of wider relevance to history of NSW.

The remains of a stable dating from the early twentieth century were found on the site of the proposed apartment building in 2001. These remains are wall footings consisting of plain dry-press bricks bonded with Portland type cement and possibly rendered with Portland cement. These stable remains belong to the Government Asylum phase and not to an earlier nineteenth-century period related to the construction and expansion of the Priory villa.

The Archaeological Assessment Report by Robert Varman 2001 found that the remains of the stables date from c. 1900 or later, and are not of sufficient significance to justify a requirement for in situ conservation. These remains date from the Government Asylum period after 1888, and are not "generally sympathetic to the form and style of the Priory up to that time." The materials recovered in the test trench were common building products of twentieth-century industrial processes. The quantity of remains has been found to be quite minimal in the test trenching. For these reasons, it would be acceptable to allow the excavation for the apartment block to remove the known archaeological remains according to Heritage Office procedures.

The site for the proposed new dwelling house on site 2 is less sensitive, being adjacent to the site of a later building, Ward 3. This asylum building was demolished and its site cleared of top soil prior to the investigations for the CMP. In 2011, the slate roof, guttering and downpipes needed repair.

As a fine example of the colonial regency style still remaining in a legible picturesque landscape, the Priory has an integrity that is unique. Its setting is highly vulnerable, as evidenced in the housing developments at (now named) Botanic Cove to the south.

=== Modifications and dates ===
The Priory has seen a number of modifications since its establishment:

- 1847: Stubbs built by 1847 the original stone farm cottage
- 1857: Marist Fathers commissioned William Weaver designed new adjoining Palladian style building fronting view to harbour. A courtyard and terracing were created to rehabilitate the stone quarry created to construct the Weaver addition.
- 1853-74 Marist Fathers acquired more (on the other side of Tarban Creek) land, relocating in 1864.
- 1862 First Villa Maria failed to sell to Government for mental hospital. Property retained for some years, and was used as a convent for some of this time. Marist Brothers continued farming the site.
- 1874+ Thomas Salter added picturesque Gothic L-shaped addition at western end of Northern (Stubbs) wing, comprising two rooms (and most likely the entrance porch), bringing the house's total to 14 rooms plus outhouses.
- 1885 plan shows: coach house at southern end, a well, small poultry yards the southern end, a tennis lawn, the Old Session House (which appears to have had additions to the north and south), an outhouse, latrines, the main house and verandahs on south, east and west, a bush house in the south-western corner of the courtyard, sheds, kitchen building, stables, a coach house, large poultry yard and cultivation paddock north of the house and a carriage way to Salter Street. Terracing of the site is also visible on this plan.
- 1887: The Priory became the first (Gladesville) Hospital building to be used on the Riverglade Cmapus, the area of the hospital on the northern side of Victoria Road. By 1890 there were 1020 patients in the asylum, 38 of whom were kept in The Priory.
- 1887-1947: the surrounding land was farmed by patients for the production of fruit and vegetables for hospital use. Land reclaimed along Tarban Creek shoreline extended the arable area.
- 1928 map shows a large stables building to the south at the rear of the houe and the cow bails building alongside the kitchen. The Priory is labelled "The Dairy" on this map. The western verandah form varies from that on the 1885 survey plan and it appears a single storey pavilion of the Weaver extension may have been extended to the west.

Little change occurred over the site in the early 20th century. Land below the Mission House was used as a golf course in the 1920s and 1930s, and the house istelsf used as the Ladies' Club House.

The main evidence of occupancy of Gladesville Hospital – is the c. 1942 air raid shelter (near the vegetable gardens, later used as a garden storage shed) and an ablution block, built more recently and the only intrusive structure on site. 1950s changes included alterations to The Priory building; demolition of the Mission House in 1952, conversion of the cow shed into a store and cleaning room, following fires in 1954 and 1958; and removal of Salter's stone garden store in 1955. Plans of 1966 and 1967 show modifications made during the 1967 NSW Public Works Department maintenance program. Toilets to the rear of the pavilion of the Weaver wing were removed to convert the space to a boiler room and a tank and stand erected to the south. These have since been removed. A brick extension, with a clip-lock roof, was added to the south of the boiler room to provide a new shower and toilet facilities. This necessitated excavation and building the retaining wall to the west. Two of the windows in the rear wall of the Weaver pavilion were filled in and the third converted to a doorway to the new extension. Fire escape doors were inserted into window openings in the west wall of the Weaver wing and the south wall of the Salter wing, and metal stairs attached. These were later removed and the windows reconstructed. A commercial kitchen was installed (c. 1967) at the western end of the Salter wing. This required removal of walls, fireplaces, floors and joinery. The fitout of the kitchen was removed in a later upgrade of the house, and the servery between kitchen and dining room filled in and the surface re-finished. A building maintenance program in 1967 saw a number of modifications made: various alterations to front and rear verandahs, removal or blocking (up) of chimneys and repair and replacement of joinery. Internal finishes such as wall and ceiling plaster were changed. A timber-framed tank stand was built on the southern elevation (later removed) and there were excavations and rebuilding of retaining walls. The grounds were also altered in this period: earlier, in 1889, mud flats at Tarban Creek were filled to provide more agricultural land. This area was cultivated continuously until the 1950s. In 1957, approximately 100 tons of soil from the vegetable garden was removed to build a sports oval on the southern side of Victoria Road. The citrus orchard, possibly remaining in the Marist Brothers period, was buried by fill in the mid-1970s and 1980s. These extensive episodes of filling have altered the landscape of The Priory and Tarban Creek.

More recently, The Priory had been a ward for patients who although rehabilitated, still required supervision. Nearby vegetable gardens still supplied the hospital and were tended by patients.

In 1975 the Asylum area north of Victoria Road was renamed the Riverglade Hospital and given over to care for the developmentally-disabled. The Priory itself formally operated as patient accommodation until 1985, known as Ward 2. The last few patients moved out by the end of 1985. It was then occupied by NSW Government's Mental Health Review Tribunal offices and staff. Further repairs and alterations ahead of the new occupation included removal of ceilings and cornices to the Stubbs and Salter wings, removal of the whole roof slating to the Stubbs wing (in 1985), replacement of external doors with modern designs, replacement of door hardware and removal of original flagging to the northern (Stubbs wing) porch.

1981 drawings show planned changes to The Priory that don't appear to have been made. The west facade of the Weaver wing may have had additional openings previously. It is possible that NSW Public Works had documentary evidence at this time relating to a former balcony and rear openings, which it planned to reinstate.

The lot boundary of The Priory was reduced in 1994 when subdivided by the State Government. The Priory on Lot 1 of DP823988 was retained in Government use and an area surrounding it to the north, east and south was sold into private ownership. The Priory continued use as offices until the Mental Health Review Tribunal vacated in 1/2003.

In 2006 development approval was given for construction of town houses south-west of The Priory, on Lot 201 DP878383. Land immediately north and east of The Priory has been dedicated for use as public open space. The Health Department transferred their ownership of the site to the Department of Lands and on 1 November 2007 the then Minister Tony Kelly MLC, added The Priory and its surrounds to the Riverglade Reserve (R100263) Trust, administered by Hunters Hill Council.

== Heritage listing ==
As at 11 March 2005, The Priory was a complex cultural landscape formed by the aesthetic and historic relationship of its harbourside location, the topography, natural and introduced vegetation, open space and a variety of buildings and structures. It has historic associations with early settlement, the advent of the Marist order in Australia and with mental health care for more than a century.

The main building and site was the first permanent home of the Marist Fathers in Australia, their base for the South Pacific, and their first, purpose-built Procure house. It is integral to the history of the original Gladesville Asylum (later renamed) for over 100 years, and hence the history of psychiatric care in NSW.

The main building (1847–1874, a Colonial Regency building) is a major landscape element, being a fine example of the colonial regency style of architecture, designed by William Weaver. In addition the site contains outbuildings, remnant structures and archaeological features that are heritage items in their own right, areas of natural vegetation and historic plantings, as well as evidence of the use of the building for farming purposes. The significance, meaning and interpretation of the building, outbuildings, archaeological sites and landscape are integral to one another.

The Priory was listed on the New South Wales State Heritage Register on 3 December 2004 having satisfied the following criteria.

The place is important in demonstrating the course, or pattern, of cultural or natural history in New South Wales.

The Priory and its curtilage were formerly part of two early land grants purchased by Thomas Stubbs from the Crown in the 1830s. It retains the major part of the original residence of Thomas Stubbs. The Priory was the first permanent home of the Marist Fathers in Australia, providing a base to their operations in the South Pacific and their first, purpose-built Procure house. The Marist Fathers have retained a nearby base in Hunters Hill to the present day. For well over 100 years the Priory has been integral to the history of the original Gladesville Asylum, later Gladesville Psychiatric Hospital – itself a significant site in the history and development of mental health care in New South Wales. The site provides rare evidence of its continued agricultural use, unusual in an area that is otherwise built up. The land was farmed first by Thomas Stubbs from the 1830s, and then by the Marist Order who extended vineyards and food production for their own consumption. For more than 60 years the area was farmed by patients for the production of fruit and vegetables for hospital use. The immediate grounds of the Priory contain an air raid shelter, a rare survivor of this underground facility from World War II.

The place has a strong or special association with a person, or group of persons, of importance of cultural or natural history of New South Wales's history.

The Priory has strong historical association with, and provides evidence of, the early settlement of Hunters Hill, reflected most directly in its location on one of the early land grants of the Municipality. The Priory has an association with the arrival of the Marist Fathers in Australia. During its period as "Villa Maria", a wooden chapel on the site was the original resting place of the body of St Peter Chanel, Proto-martyr of Oceania, following his martyrdom on the island of Futuna, in 1841. It was also the residence of Blessed Giovanni Mazzucconi on his arrival in the region in 1852 and again immediately before his martyrdom, by New Guinea Islanders, in 1855. These associations make the Priory a place of exceptional importance both for Australian Catholics and for Australians of Italian background. The Marist Fathers subsequently had an important influence on the development of Hunters Hill and religion in the colony and in the Pacific. The Priory has a strong association with the history of Gladesville Hospital and hence psychiatric care in New South Wales.

The place is important in demonstrating aesthetic characteristics and/or a high degree of creative or technical achievement in New South Wales.

The aesthetic attraction of the Priory and its surrounding landscape is the combined product of topography, architectural variety, natural and exotic vegetation, open space and intimacy of the nearby water space and surrounding ridges. Vistas from within the area provide satisfying views of diverse characteristics – including natural bushland, landmark buildings, nineteenth century plantings and the Tarban Creek estuary and bridge. Vistas to the Priory from Hunters Hill provide rare, picturesque views of the building and its surrounding landscape within a suburban context. The Priory is a fine example of the colonial regency architectural style built in locally quarried sandstone. The main Priory building is an early and relatively intact example of the work of the important early Victorian architect, William Weaver. In addition to its integrity and quality in the Palladian style, the Priory is notable as a hybrid structure, successfully incorporating both the early farm cottage of Thomas Stubbs and the later picturesque structure added by Thomas Salter.

The place has a strong or special association with a particular community or cultural group in New South Wales for social, cultural or spiritual reasons.

The Priory and its surrounding landscape provide physical evidence of the establishment of the Marist Order in Australia. It has strong association with that order, as it was the headquarters for their Australian and Pacific operations. The Priory and its surrounding landscape provide important evidence of its association with the Gladesville Hospital, in particular, and mental health care, in general. The cessation of farming the area by patients marks an important change in attitudes to psychiatric hospital care in NSW. The Priory has contemporary significance for the Gladesville/Hunters Hill communities, who rallied in opposition to an earlier development proposal.

The place has potential to yield information that will contribute to an understanding of the cultural or natural history of New South Wales.

The immediate surrounding landscape contains a number of former outbuildings, structures and remnants with the potential to yield further information about how the site was used by each of its past occupants. These structures include former kitchen, stone terraces that define the garden layout, air raid shelter and footings to the "latrine" or garden building. The immediate surrounding landscape contains a number of archaeological sites (including cow bail site, stables, turning circle and road layout) all able to yield further information about the use of site past occupants. Evidence of original plantings exist in significant clumps of trees to the east, north and west of the Priory. These provide important information about the evolution/ and layout of the formal garden and surrounding landscape over time. Former outbuildings, archaeological sites and original plantings have value in interpreting the use of the Priory and the potential to yield information of wider relevance to history of NSW.

The place possesses uncommon, rare or endangered aspects of the cultural or natural history of New South Wales.

As a site, building and landscape with so many layers of history still intact or able to be interpreted, the Priory is unique in its exemplification of the history of New South Wales and the settlement of Australia.

== See also ==
- Gladesville Mental Hospital
