= Frederick Manning =

Frederic(k) or Fred Manning may refer to:

- Frederic Manning (1882 - 1935), Australian poet and novelist
- Frederick Manning Needham, Master of the Worshipful Company of Brewers in 1872
- Frederick Norton Manning (1839 - 1903), Australian military surgeon and psychiatrist
- Frederick Edward Maning (1812 - 1883), New Zealand author [note the spelling of the surname with a single 'n']
- Fred M. Manning (d.1958), American developer
- Frederick Stewart Manning (1874 - 1960), American sheet music cover artist
- J. Fred Manning (1875 - 1955), Massachusetts politician
- Fred Manning (1915 - 1978), British WW2 Army Commando
- Fred Manning, founder of Great Eastern Corporation Ltd (Canadian Asset Management Company)
- Dr Frederick Johnson Manning (1894 - 1966), Yale history professor and husband of Helen Taft Manning (American historian and daughter of US President William Howard Taft)
- Air Commodore Frederick John Manning (1912 - 1988), Officer of the Royal Air Force and the last Air Officer i/c Administration at HQ Fighter Command
