= Gladesville Drill Hall =

Former drill hall in City of Ryde, New South Wales, Australia

- Location within Sydney Location within Australia
- 33°49′22″S 151°07′32″E
- Location: 144 Ryde Road, Gladesville New South Wales, Australia

History
- Built: 1900

Site notes
- Architect: NSW Government Architect's Office

New South Wales Heritage Register
- Official name: Gladesville Drill Hall; Drill Hall; Army Reserve Depot
- Type: State heritage (built)
- Designated: 2 April 1999
- Reference no.: 782
- Type: Drill Hall
- Category: Defence
- Builders: Mr Neely (Chatswood)

The Gladesville Drill Hall is a heritage-listed former drill hall and now residence located at 144 Ryde Road, Gladesville, Sydney, Australia. It was designed by NSW Government Architect's Office and built during 1900 by Mr Neely of Chatswood. It is also known as Drill Hall and Army Reserve Depot. The property is privately owned.

== History ==
=== Area history ===
The area which was later to become the Gladesville Drill Hall site and the adjacent Monash Park was, in the late 19th century, used for civil militia purposes. In the 1870s to 1890s the site was under tentage, with a parade ground and a small bore miniature rifle range adjacent.

=== Site history ===
The parcel of land on which this building was erected was originally part of the Field of Mars Reserve, but was withheld from sale when the Common began to be subdivided in August 1885.

Around this time the first militia was formed in the district and called the Hunters Hill Reserves. By 1900 the company had become K Company, 1st Infantry Regiment and they had a drill shed of some sort on or near the corner of Convent Road (now Monash Road) and Gladesville Road (now Victoria Road). The Sands' Sydney Directories lists the "Headquarters K Company 1st Regiment" at this address from 1896.

The Cumberland Argus & Fruit Growers Advocate reported on 24 March 1900 that" construction of the new drill hall for K Company 1st Regiment, has been commenced at the corner of the Quarry Reserve, off the Ryde-road, Gladesville". The hall was to be sixty feet by thirty feet, built of wood with an iron roof, on a concrete foundation. It was to contain three offices, each ten feet by ten feet. The contractor was "Mr Neely of Chatswood, son of Mr Neely, of Gladesville, and the contract price was a little over A£500. The work was to be completed in 10 weeks. On 5 May 1900 the Cumberland Argus & Fruit Growers Advocate reported the hall was due to be completed by mid-May and that it was "commodious, substantial and a well ventilated structure".

==== Official opening ====
The new Drill Hall was officially opened on 13 July 1900 with "a Grand Military Ball. The Cumberland Argus & Fruit Growers Advocate reported this event on 21 July 1900, declaring it be a function which "...far exceeded anything of the kind held in the district for many a long day". The Argus went on to say that "the fine commodious hall was packed with a gay and brilliant assemblage" and that refreshments were provided in a"commodious marquee just outside the hall".

The Drill Hall figured prominently in official ceremonies in Ryde on 23 February 1901. This was the day on which De Burgh's Bridge across the Lane Cove River at North Ryde was officially opened and the day on which the first sod of the Field of Mars Tramway was turned. It was, wrote the Cumberland Argus & Fruit Growers Advocate, "a red-letter day in the Ryde district". The Minister for Public Works, Mr E. W. O'Sullivan, first opened the bridge at North Ryde, then returned to Gladesville to turn the sod, after which the official party of between 120 and 130 people "sat down to a banquet in the Drill Hall, Gladesville" at which Alderman J. Redshaw, the Mayor of Ryde, presided. Ex-Alderman Robert Campbell Swan, whose residence in Eltham Street Gladesville adjoined the Drill Hall, "had a string of flags conspicuously displayed" in honour of the occasion.

The official party which gathered at Gladesville to turn the first sod of the tramway was, wrote The Argus, the "largest seen in Gladesville for many a long day" and included a guard of honour, consisting of 42 members of K Company in review order, under Captain Tilney. The centre of attention was "a little green spot at the intersection of Convent (now Monash) and Ryde Roads, almost opposite the main entrance to the Drill Hall". The proposed tramway was to proceed along Convent, Higginbotham, Pidding, Badajoz and Bridge Road to Marsfield and thence to Epping. It never eventuated.

==== Early Federation history ====
Ryde Council minutes of a meeting held on 13 July 1904 noted that a letter had been received from H. Hillier, Col. Sergt. F Company 1st Australian Infantry Regiment, asking Council to protest against the removal of the Headquarters of F Company from Gladesville. The Mayor moved a motion that the request be complied with, and that the Federal representative be asked to assist. The Cumberland Argus & Fruit Growers Advocate of 16 July 1904 reported that the same letter had been read to a meeting of the Gladesville Progress Association. The Argus reported that the letter claimed that the removal of the Headquarters of F Company from Gladesville to Sydney would be "detrimental to the interests of the district and would deprive the young men of it of necessary military training". The letter went on to explain that the company had been maintained by the district '10r upwards of 20 years; firstly as the Hunters Hill Reserves, and later as K Company, 1st Infantry Regiment, and since the reorganisation of the military forces £1903], as F Company, 1st Australian Regiment". The letter also explained that, at the present time, the membership of the company was not up to strength, being 14 short of the establishment of 60, but that recruiting had been suspended for some time. The letter declared that the removal of the company would "necessitate the demolition of the Drill Hall which was erected in 1901, at a cost of between £600 and £700" and the closing of the rifle range, "which offered facilities to civilians as well as the militia".

The minutes for 30 September 1904 recorded Council's receipt of a letter from Dugald Thomson MP re the removal of the Headquarters of the F Company 1st Australian Regiment stating that it was not the intention of the Defence Department to remove the Headquarters.

Although the Australian Government took over construction of Drill Halls following Federation in 1901 the Halls in NSW continued to be designed by the NSW Government Architect's Branch. An article in The Sydney Morning Herald of 30 August 1904 described the erection of a large drill hall at Victoria Barracks, Paddington, and the proposed erection of a new Volunteer Drill Hall at Leichhardt: '... The Commonwealth Government is erecting a drillhall at Victoria Barracks for the use of the purely volunteer regiments ... There has been no lavish expenditure incurred in connection with the building. It is plainly finished in every detail, yet the authorities will have the largest drill hall in the State, a building in which ample accommodation combined with strength are the leading features... '

In 1904, the volunteers had been reformed as F Company 1st Australian Regiment, and become co-located with the school cadets of St Joseph's College at the Drill Hall. An extract from the SJC Magazine of 1911 describes the arrangements for the college's cadet corps: '... As all know, the corps now belongs to the Commonwealth Military Forces. It forms part of the 19th Battalion, 5th North Sydney Brigade. The Training Area is 19A Hunter's Fill; Headquarters, the Drill Hall, Gladesville. Our cadets form the "A" Company of the Battalion... The formation of the corps took place soon after the re-opening in January of this year. A company of 120 strong was formed of boys between 14 and 17 years, the training age for Senior Cadets. An over-age section was also formed, but through lack of encouragement it soon disbanded. At the beginning of the year the boys were submitted to a strict medical examination by Dr Lloyd, assisted by three of the military authorities.'

==== History during World War I ====
In 1911, a second report in the SJC Magazine reported less optimistically on the corps's fortunes: '... Early in the year we were in hopes of obtaining a fresh supply of equipment, but our hopes were groundless, for after June there were extremely few who possessed a full uniform. However, it doesn't need a khaki uniform to remind a true Cadet that he is on parade... Owing to the scarcity of officers, the shortage of equipment, and the necessity for calling in all rifles, the Government has decided to suspend all drill for the present, but we may hear of its revival in the near future. Nevertheless, the training the Cadets have received will stand them in good stead.'

By 1914, the company had been reformed as the 18th Battalion [18BTN] including a machine gun company. The Battalion was still co-located with the St Joseph's College Cadet Corps.

At or about the end of World War I, the Hall became the headquarters for the 19th Battalion [19BTN] who remained there until 1941, at which time the Hall and site was occupied by the 35th Battalion [35BTN] including a machine gun company.

==== History during and after World War II ====
The 35th Battalion remained for ten years to be replaced in 1951 by the 2nd Field Engineers Regiment. This regiment stayed for nineteen years and was replaced in 1970 by the 2nd Division Provost Company. Seven years later they were replaced by the 4th Engineers Regiment, who remained there until the unit was relocated to the Dundas Depot in 1995.

By the late 1980s, it had become clearly apparent to the Army, and the new Army Headquarters 2nd Military District [including Gladesville], that many of their Army Reserve Depots, established in the early years of this century [and late in the last century], were inadequate to meet modem standards and in a number of cases were inappropriately located within the current demographic structure for metropolitan Sydney and Newcastle. Furthermore, the operational requirements of the modern day Army had changed leaving an under-utilisation of these valuable assets.

In August 1995 the Reserve Depot was vacated and the 4th Field Engineers Regiment was relocated to Dundas.

== Description ==
The Gladesville Army Reserve Drill Hall is a sophisticated timber building with quality detailing that supports the overall design of the building. The building is rectangular is plan with a corrugated iron sheet gable roof and a skillion extension to the west. The details in this timber building are of a fine quality with timber double hung, multi-paned sash windows and highlights and finely moulded and detailed architraves to the windows and main entrance door. The exterior is lined with beaded boarding and the base of the main building is filled in with a masonry wall. The gable ends of the main hall have highlist windows with louvres above to the apex. The interior of the hall was originally a double storey open space. The interior structure is based on a braced post and beam wall structure which carries a classic timber post truss. There are five internal king post trusses. The floors are generally 100 by 25 mm tongue and groove hardwood boards.

=== Condition ===
As at 24 October 2008, the physical condition was good. Archaeological potential is high.

== Heritage listing ==
As at 26 June 2007, the former Drill Hall is significant because it is one of the few (if any) pre-Federation, i.e. Colonial, drill hall establishments remnant in Sydney. The Drill Hall (and its site) are representative of the continuous evolution of Citizen's Militia from Colonial Volunteer and Militia Orderly Rooms to early 20th century drill halls, to late 20th century Army Reserve training depots, and latterly to multi-user depots. The Drill Hall site has historical associations with the former Eltham Estate and the creation of the adjacent Monash Park. The site and this area of Gladesville have clear association with the famous WW1 soldiers, Sir John Monash and Brigadier Sydney Herring. The former drill hall building is representative of the work of NSW Government Architects Branch at the turn of the (20th) century, and is a richly detailed and architecturally satisfying example of that Branch's architectural style. The former drill hall is one of only three such buildings with remain extant. The Drill Hackle and Army Reserve Training Depot has had considerable social connection with the Ryde/Gladesville/Hunters Hill communities, and thus has "social value" to those communities. The former Drill Hall, as a relatively rare example of a pre WW1 civilian training hall thus, providing an understanding of an aspect of the evolution of the Civil Militia movement in New South Wales.

Gladesville Drill Hall was listed on the New South Wales State Heritage Register on 2 April 1999 having satisfied the following criteria.

The place possesses uncommon, rare or endangered aspects of the cultural or natural history of New South Wales.

Gladesville Drill Hall is one of only three surviving examples in New South Wales of the drill halls built by the colonial government prior to Federation and the only example in Sydney.

== See also ==
- List of former military installations in New South Wales
