= Frederick Norton Manning =

Australian surgeon

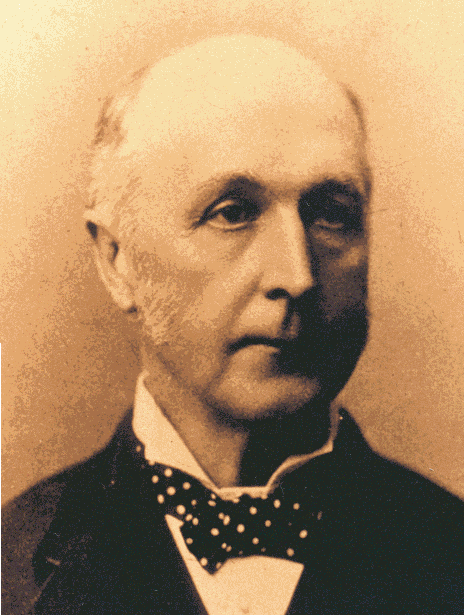
- Born: 25 February 1839; Rothersthorpe, Northamptonshire, England
- Died: 18 June 1903 (aged 64); Sydney
- Education: St George's Hospital, London (M.R.C.S., L.S.A., 1860), University of St Andrews (M.D., 1862)
- Years active: c. 1865 – 1898
- Known for: Inspector-General of the Insane, Colony of New South Wales
- Medical career
- Profession: Doctor
- Institutions: Tarban Creek Asylum (later Gladesville Mental Hospital), Callan Park Asylum, Royal Prince Alfred Hospital
- Sub-specialties: Military Surgeon, Psychiatrist
- Research: Psychiatry

Frederick Norton Manning (25 February 1839 – 18 June 1903), was a medical practitioner, military surgeon, Inspector General of the Insane for the Colony of New South Wales, and was an Australian Lunatic Asylum Superintendent. He was a leading figure in the establishment of a number of lunatic asylums in the colonies of New South Wales and Victoria, and participated in inquests and reviews of asylums throughout the colonies.

== Early career ==
Manning studied at St George's Hospital, South London (M.R.C.S., L.S.A., 1860) and the University of St Andrews (M.D., 1862). After joining the navy as a surgeon he saw active service in New Zealand on board HMS Esk. The ship took part in the New Zealand Wars in New Zealand and Manning was present at the savage fighting at Gate Pa, where most of the officers in the naval brigade were either killed or wounded.

== Tarban Creek ==
On a visit to Sydney in 1867 Manning was invited by Henry Parkes to become medical superintendent of the Tarban Creek Lunatic Asylum. Before accepting, Manning went overseas and studied methods of patient care and administration of asylums; on his return to Sydney he submitted a notable report. He was appointed to Tarban Creek on 15 October 1868 and immediately reported on the isolation of patients from their relations in accommodation best described as 'prison-like and gloomy', the inadequate facilities for their gainful employment and recreation and the monotonous diets deficient in both quantity and quality. In January 1869 the asylum's name was changed to the Hospital for the Insane, Gladesville, wherein patients were to receive treatment rather than be confined in a 'cemetery for diseased intellects'. By 1879 radical changes in patient care and accommodation had been made. Gladesville was extended and modernised and an asylum for imbeciles set up in Newcastle and a temporary asylum at Cooma. Manning minimised the use of restraint and provided for patient activities. Manning also established a vineyard at Tarban Creek in 1870.

== Inspector General ==
On 1 July 1876 Manning was appointed Inspector General of the Insane with responsibility for all mental institutions except the Parramatta asylum for criminals. After much agitation by Manning, new hospitals were opened at Callan Park and Goulburn, and additions made to the Darlinghurst reception house. Manning believed that staff should be competent and encouraged in-service training for nurses and attendants. He often criticised the accommodation and low wages. He supported the creation of the Australasian Trained Nurses' Association and in 1899–1902 was its first president.

== Other duties ==
Manning had become a trustee of Royal Prince Alfred Hospital in 1873 and was a member of the New South Wales branch of the British Medical Association. In 1876, he was elected to the Royal Society of New South Wales and in 1883–84 was chairman of its medical section. In 1883–96 he was an examiner and in 1886–88 the first lecturer in psychological medicine at the University of Sydney. In 1882 he had been appointed to the Board of Health and in 1889–92 was medical advisor to the government, president of the Board of Health and health and emigration officer for Port Jackson. He was prominent in the proceedings of the second (1889) and third (1892) sessions of the Intercolonial Medical Congress of Australasia. Manning had served on an inquiry into the Hospital for the Insane at New Norfolk, Tasmania, in 1884 and on another at the Bay View Lunatic Asylum in 1894. In 1895 he served on the Royal Commission on the notorious poisoner, George Dean. He agreed with Dr P. S. Jones that the evidence was compatible with attempted suicide and secured Dean's release.

== Final years ==
On 12 February 1898, ill health forced Manning to retire as Inspector General. In February 1899, he was appointed to the Royal Commission on public charities. In 1901 he became a trustee of the National Art Gallery of New South Wales. Unmarried, he died from a stomach ulcer on 18 June 1903 at his rooms in Phillip Street, and at his request was buried in the cemetery at Gladesville Mental Hospital. His grave can still be seen in a grove adjacent to Victoria Road. Some of his papers are in the National Library of Australia.

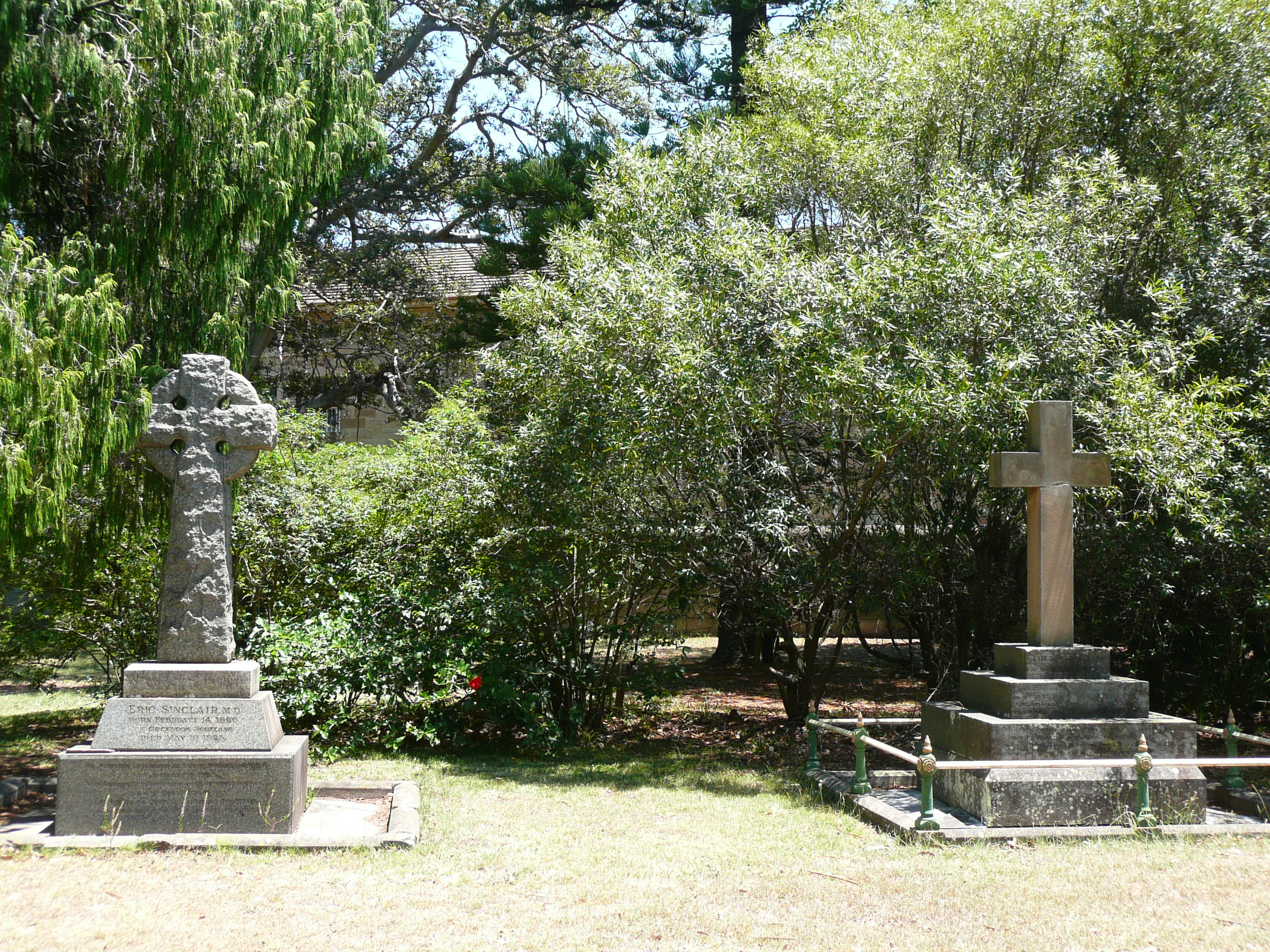
Graves of Manning, right, and Dr Eric Sinclair, left, at Gladesville Hospital

== In Memoriam ==
The two main roads of the Macquarie Hospital, North Ryde, (formerly the North Ryde Psychiatric Centre and Gladesville Macquarie Hospital) are Norton Road and Manning Road, are named after Frederick Norton Manning.
