= Gladesville Mental Hospital =

Former psychiatric hospital in Sydney, New South Wales, Australia

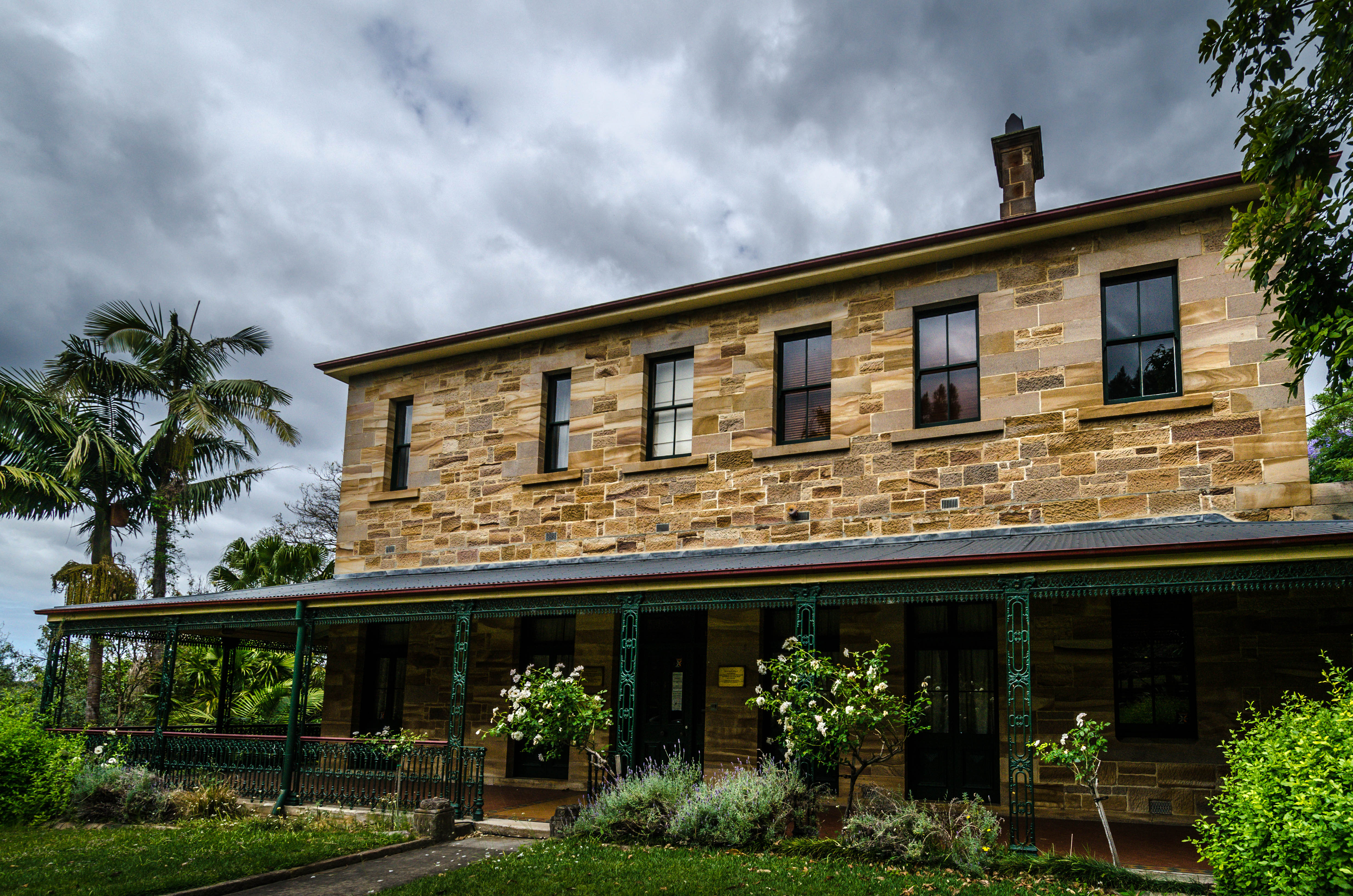
- The Medical Superintendent's Residence of the former hospital

Geography
- Location: Gladesville, New South Wales, Australia

Organisation
- Type: Disused mental hospital

Links
- Lists: Hospitals in Australia
Gladesville Mental Hospital
- Interactive map of the Gladesville Mental Hospital area
- Alternative names: Tarban Creek Lunatic Asylum
General information
- Coordinates: 33°50′16″S 151°07′51″E
- Construction started: 1836
- Completed: 1838
- Opened: 19 November 1838
- Closed: 29 January 1993
- Owner: Government of New South Wales via NSW Ministry of Health
Technical details
- Material: Sandstone
- Size: 25.4 Hectares
Design and construction
- Architects: Mortimer Lewis; James Barnet
- Architecture firm: Colonial Architect of New South Wales
- Other designers: Joseph Thomas Digby; Frederick Norton Manning (hospital design)

New South Wales Heritage Register
- Official name: Gladesville Hospital Precinct
- Criteria: a., c., d., e.
- Designated: 1 December 1995
- Reference no.: s.170 NSW State agency heritage register

The Gladesville Mental Hospital, formerly known as the Tarban Creek Lunatic Asylum, was a psychiatric hospital established in 1838 in the Sydney suburb of Gladesville. The hospital officially closed in 1993, with the last inpatient services ceasing in 1997.

== Description and history ==
Before 1838, people with mental or emotional problems in the Sydney area were housed in a "lunatic asylum" in Gladesville, a suburb located on the Parramatta River's Northern banks between Sydney and Parramatta, or in the Female Factory at Parramatta, twenty-four kilometres west of Sydney. In the 1830s, construction of a purpose-built asylum began on the banks of the Parramatta River, in the area now known as Gladesville. The original sandstone complex, known initially as Tarban Creek Lunatic Asylum, was designed by the Colonial Architect, Mortimer Lewis, between 1836 and 1838. Patients were then transferred from Liverpool and the Female Factory. James Barnet designed additional buildings in the hospital grounds precinct.

On 29 January 1993, Gladesville Hospital, together with Macquarie Hospital, was revoked as a hospital, and was amalgamated to form the Gladesville Macquarie Hospital. The last inpatient services were closed in 1997.

The first supervisor was John Thomas Digby, who sought to improve the treatment of the mentally ill, as did his successor, Frederick Norton Manning. On a visit to Sydney in 1867, Manning was invited by Henry Parkes to become medical superintendent of the Tarban Creek Lunatic Asylum. Before accepting, Manning went overseas and studied methods of patient care and administration of asylums; on his return to Sydney, he submitted a notable report. He was appointed to Tarban Creek on 15 October 1868 and immediately reported on the isolation of patients from their relations in accommodation best described as 'prison-like and gloomy', the inadequate facilities for their gainful employment and recreation and the monotonous diets deficient in both quantity and quality. In January 1869, the asylum's name was changed to the Hospital for the Insane, Gladesville, wherein patients were to receive treatment rather than be confined in a 'cemetery for diseased intellects'. By 1879 radical changes in patient care and accommodation had been made. Gladesville was extended and modernized, and an asylum for imbeciles set up in Newcastle and a temporary asylum at Cooma. Manning minimized the use of restraint and provided for patient activities

The hospital continued to grow, sometimes through acquiring nearby properties. One notable acquisition was the heritage-listed The Priory, a two-storey sandstone house in Salter Street, Gladesville. The house was built in the late 1840s, possibly by a family named Stubbs. In the 1850s, it was sold to the Marist Fathers, who influenced the early development of Hunters Hill. The hospital acquired it in 1888. It was listed on the (now defunct) Register of the National Estate in 1978.

In 1915, the designation was changed again when the complex became known as the Gladesville Mental Hospital. In 1993, the Gladesville hospital was amalgamated with the Macquarie Hospital at North Ryde to create Gladesville Macquarie Hospital. In 1997, all inpatient services were consolidated at the Macquarie, North Ryde site.

== Heritage listings ==
The following buildings and structures have various heritage listings on the New South Wales State Heritage Register, the local government register of the New South Wales Heritage Database, and/or the (now defunct) Register of the National Estate.

- Cypress Grove, Victoria Road
- Doctor's Residences, south side of Punt Road gates and around Crown Close commonly called The Circle
- Escarpment Terraces
- Former Medical Superintendent's Residence, designed by Barnet
- Gardener's Store
- Gatekeeper's Cottage, near Punt Road gates
- Gatekeeper's Lodge, Victoria Road
- Medical Records Department, Victoria Road
- Original Quadrangle Complex of 1838
- Pottery Building
- Provision Store
- Punt Road gates
- Sandstone and stone walling within the hospital grounds
- Service Buildings group, between 1838 buildings and Punt Road gates
- The Priory, Salter Street
- Wards 17 and 18, designed by Barnet
- Workshop (former Male Ward 9)

== Gallery ==
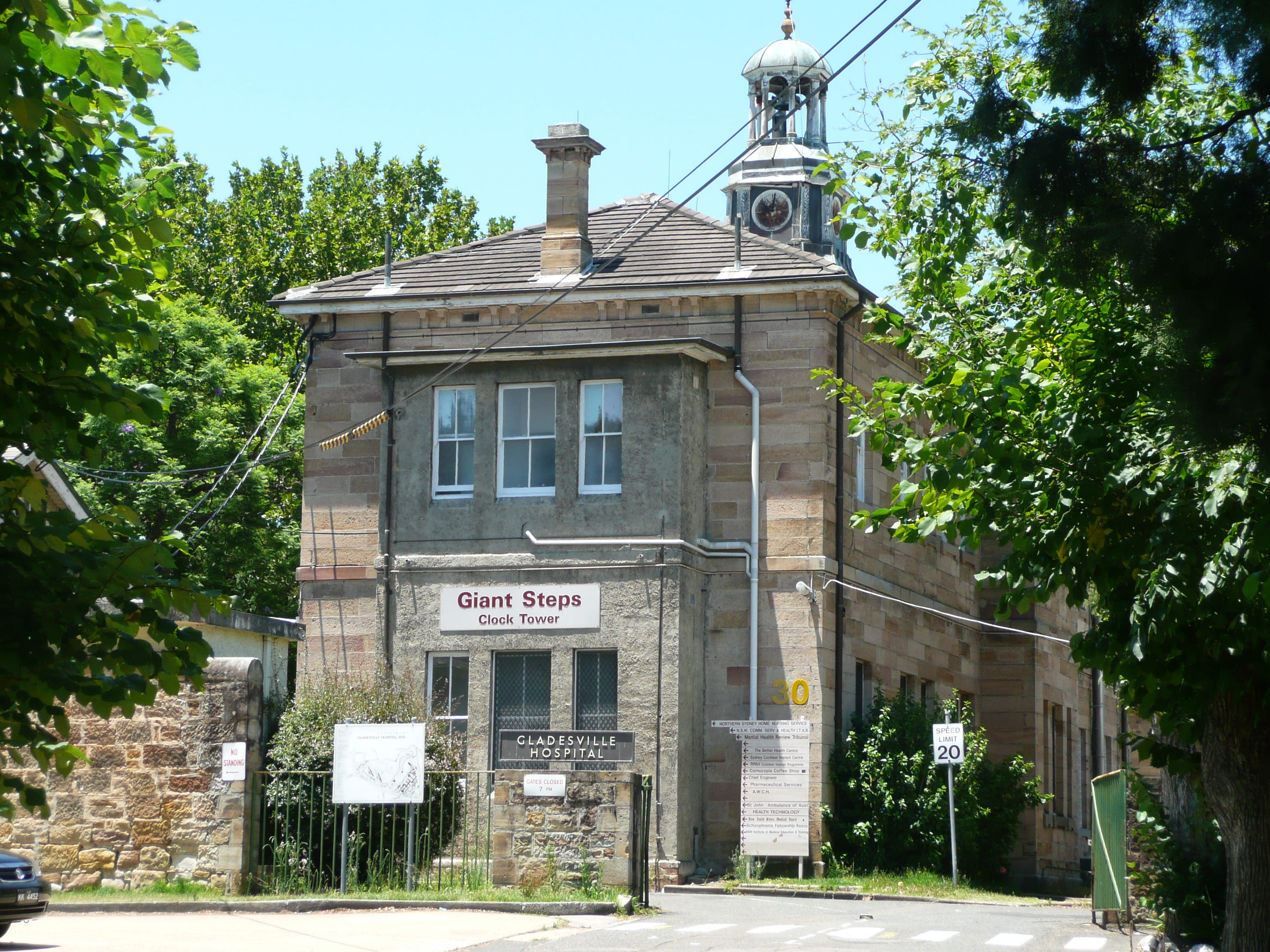
Building 30

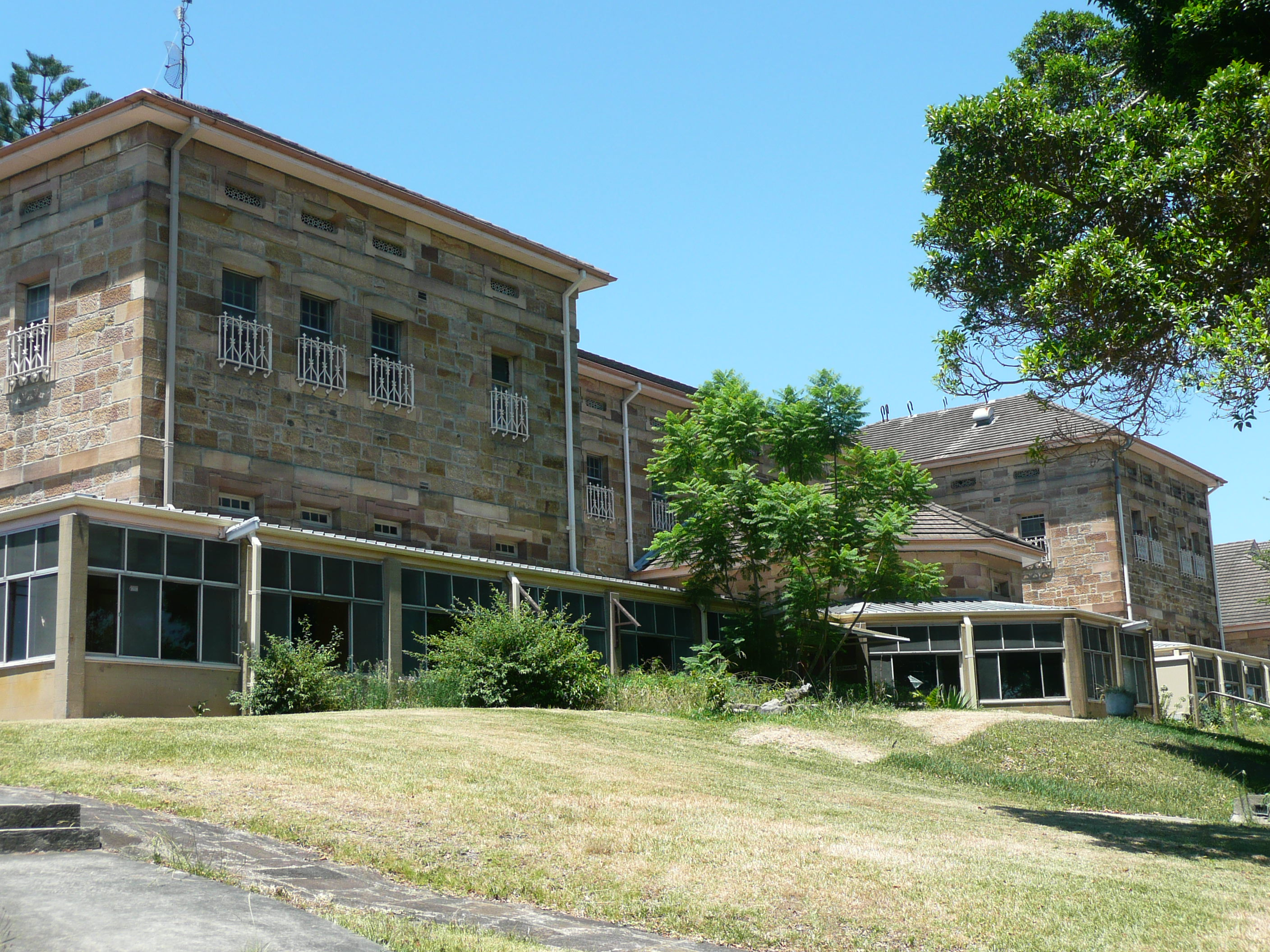
Wards 17 and 18

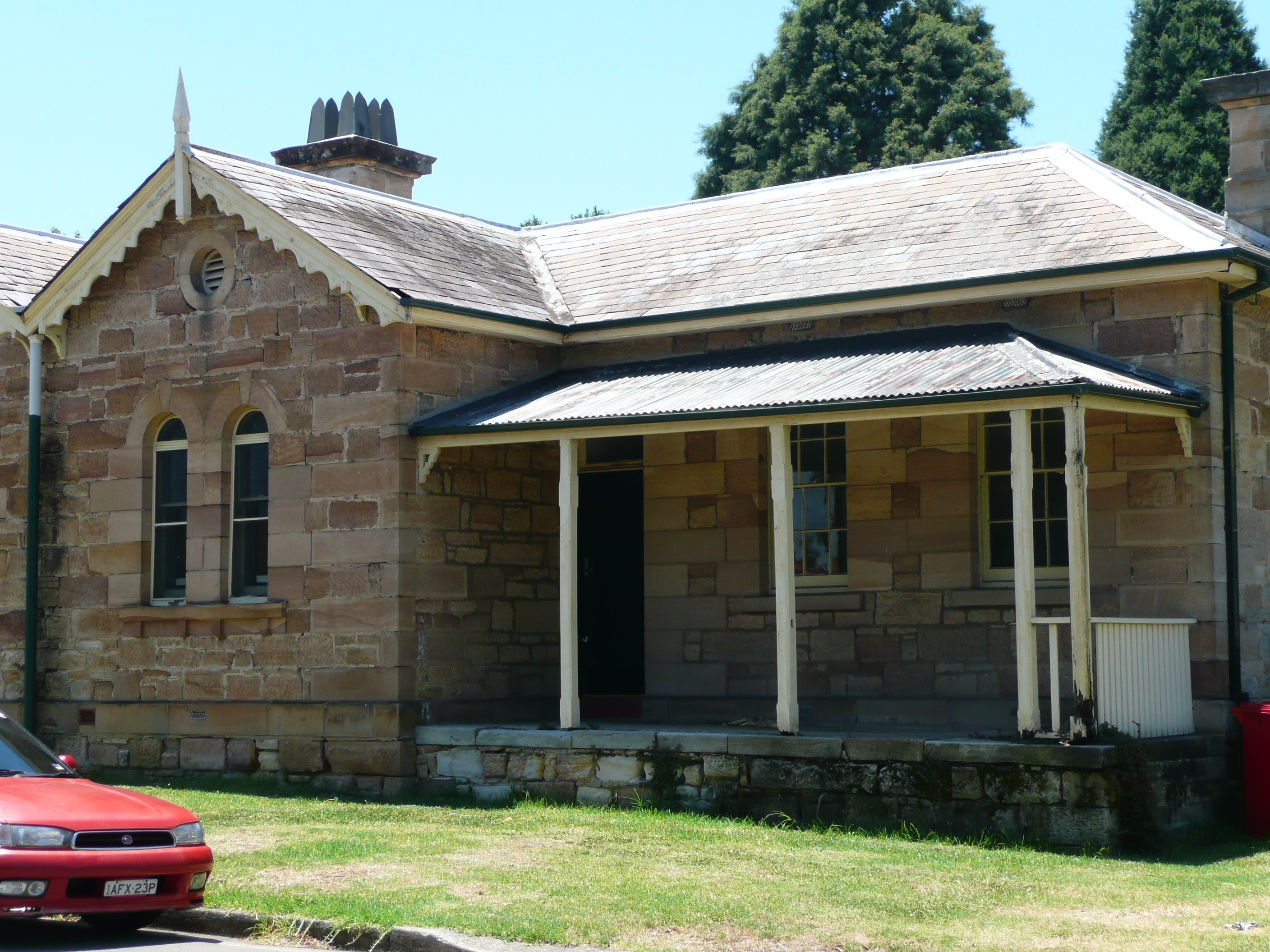
Gate cottage, Punt Road

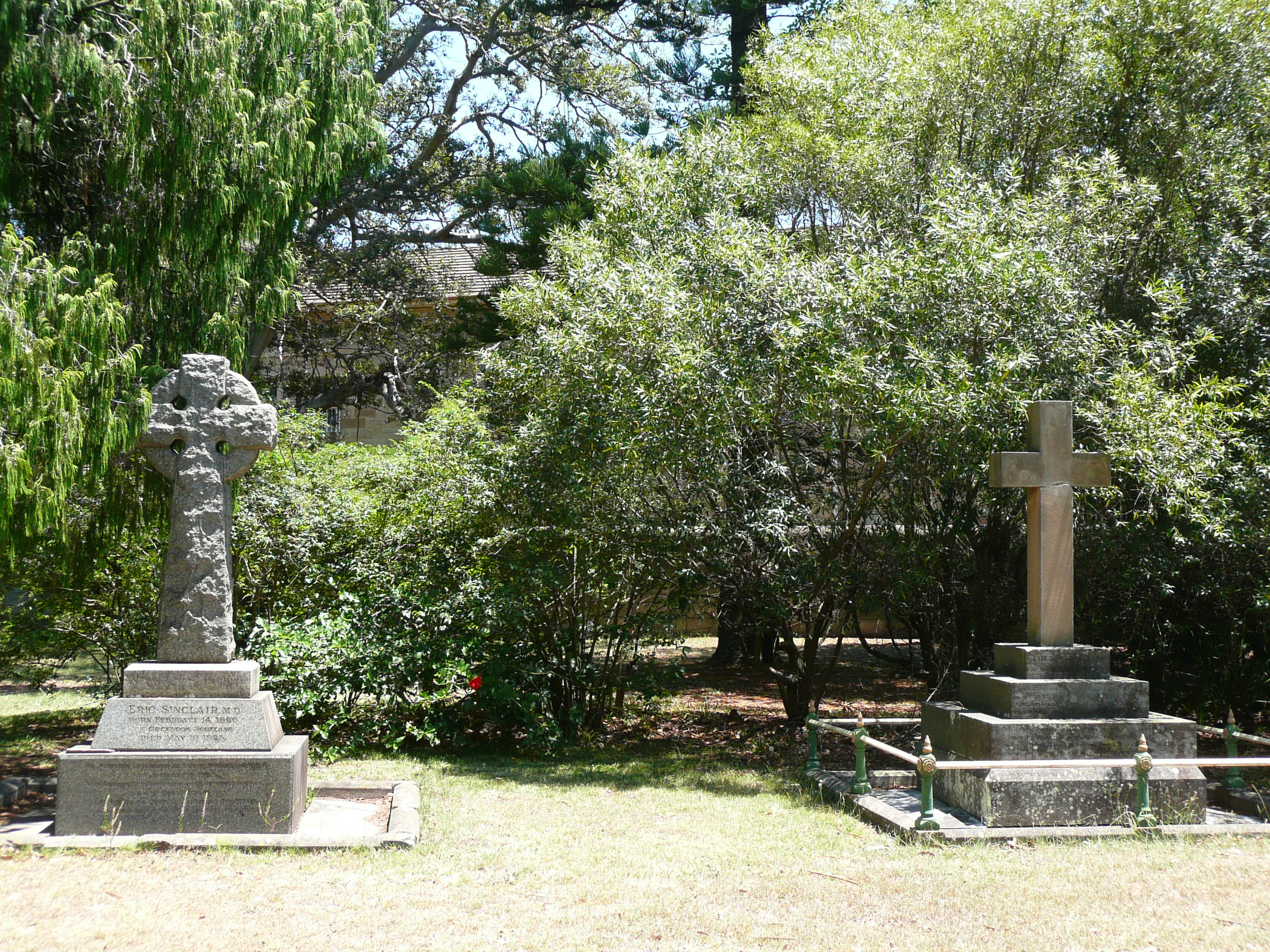
Graves of Eric Sinclair, left, and Frederick Norton Manning, Victoria Road

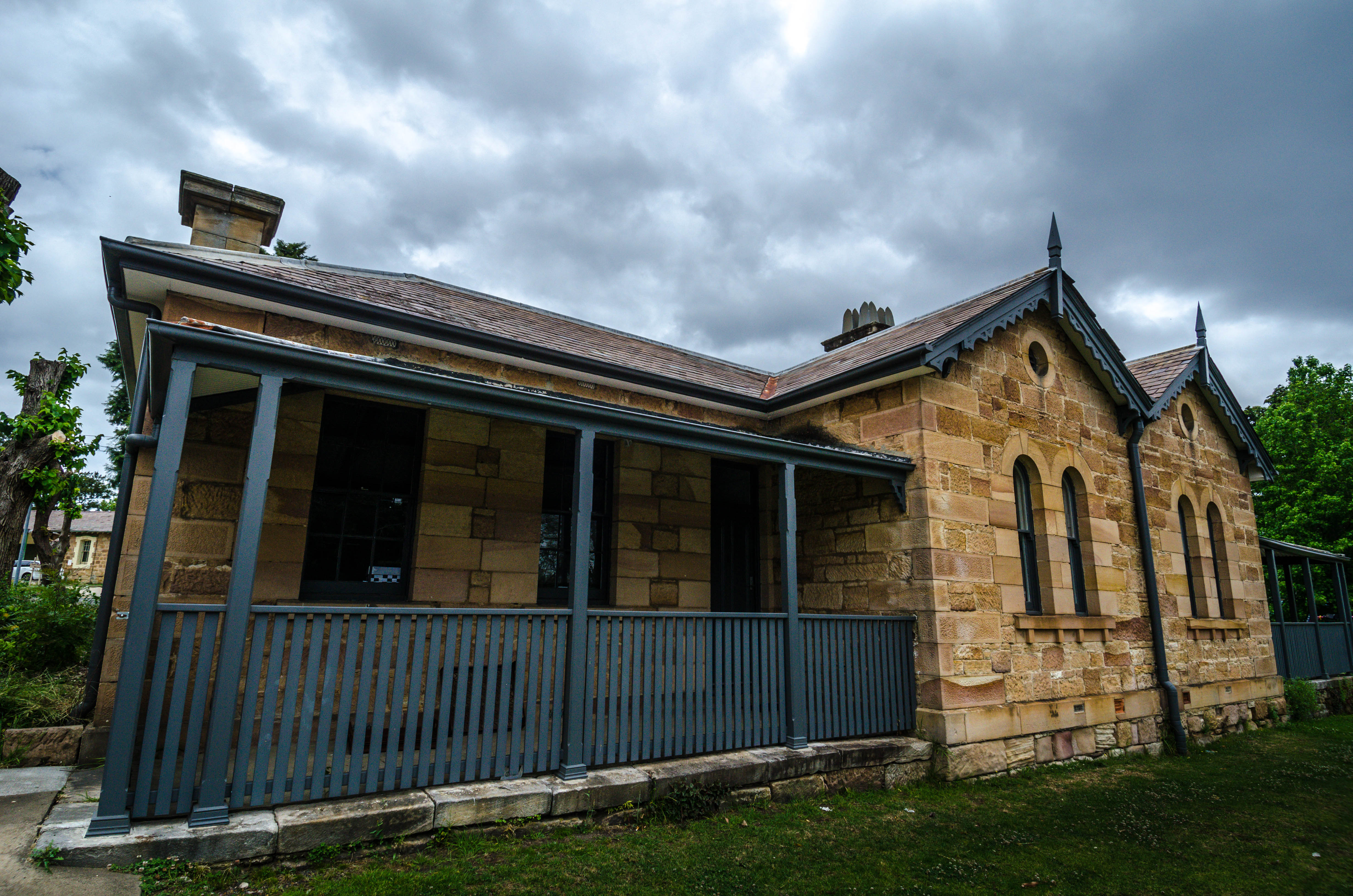
Gate cottage, Victoria Road

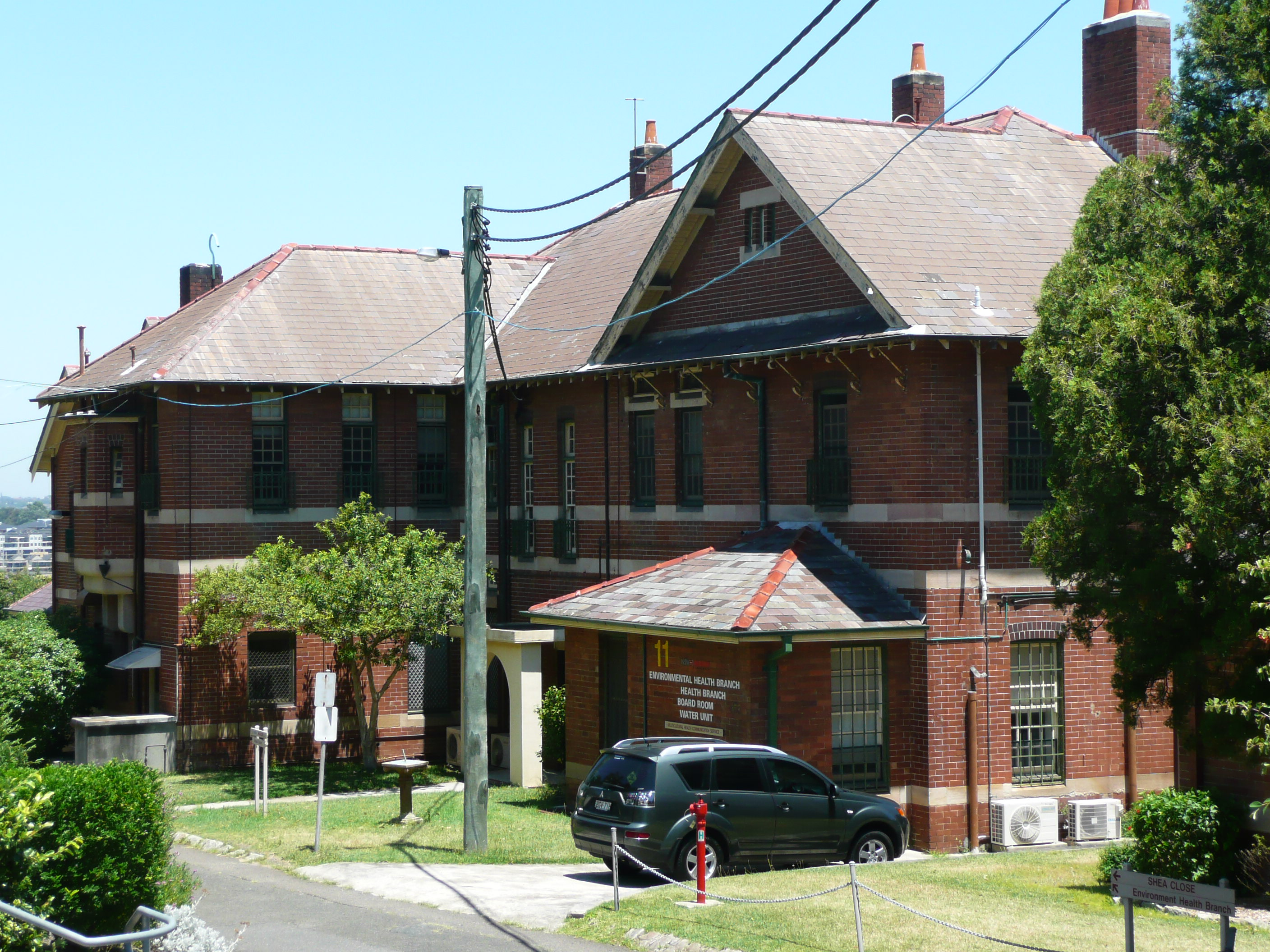
Building 11

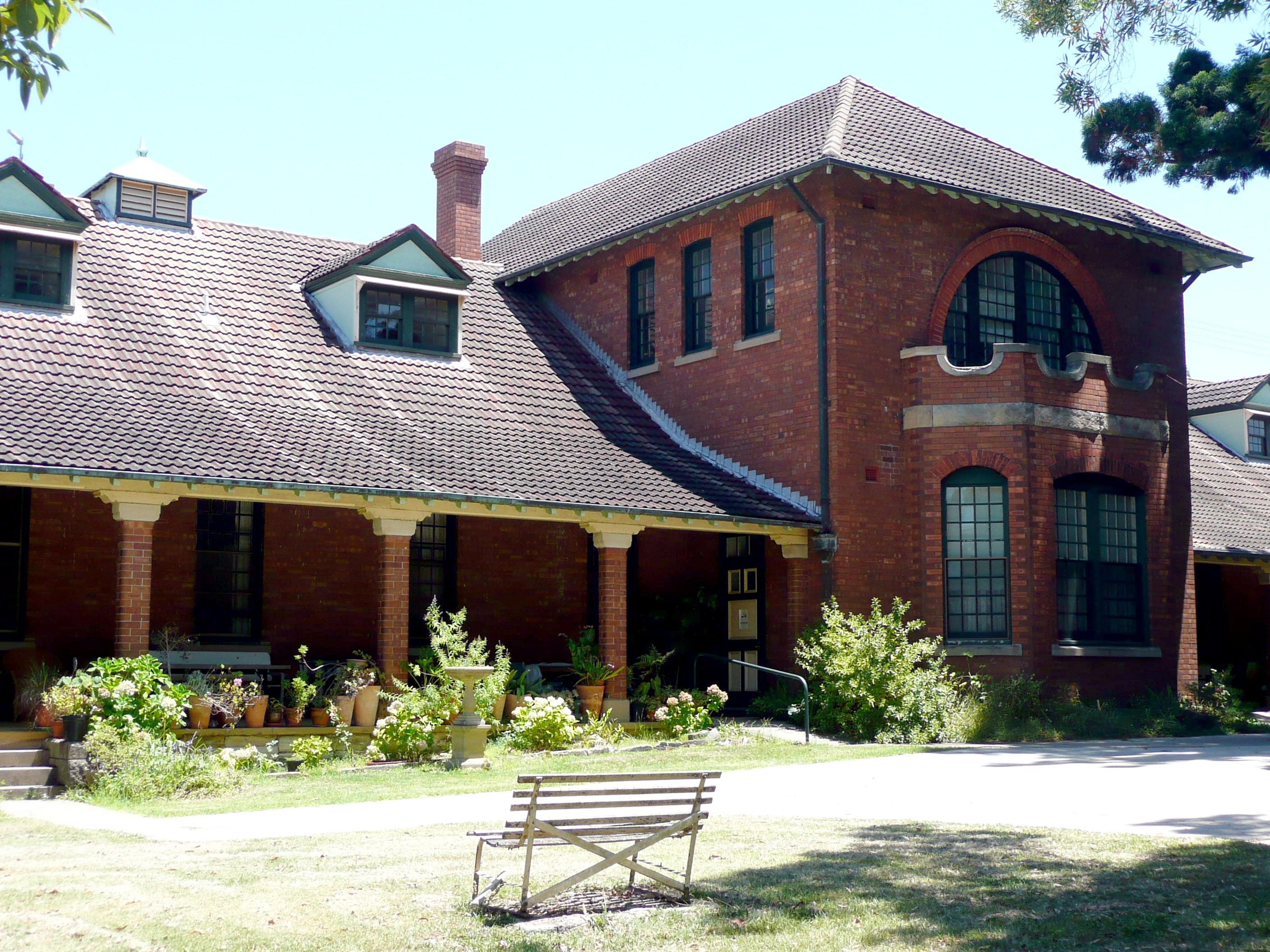
Digby House, named after John Thomas Digby

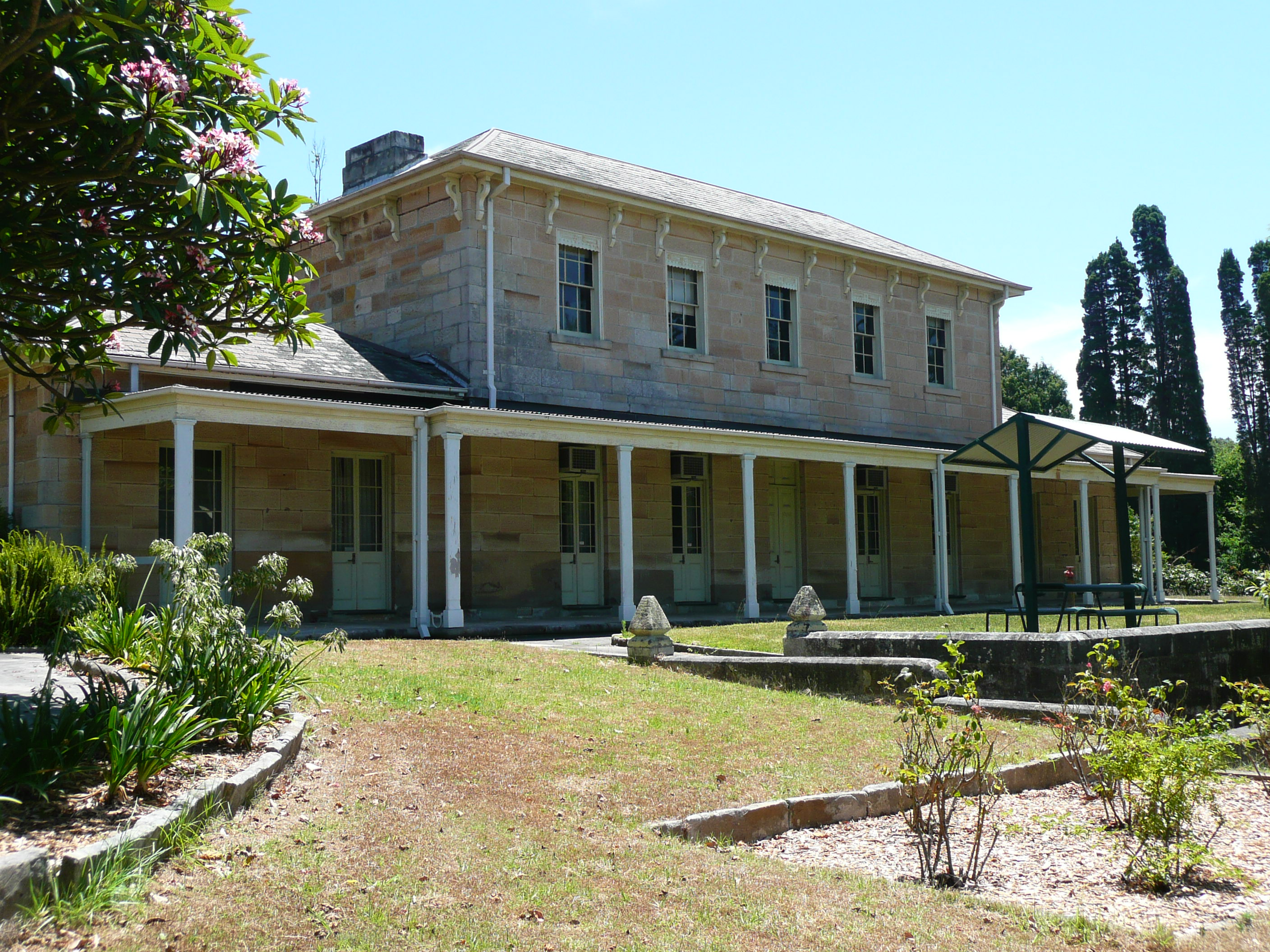
The Priory, Salter Street

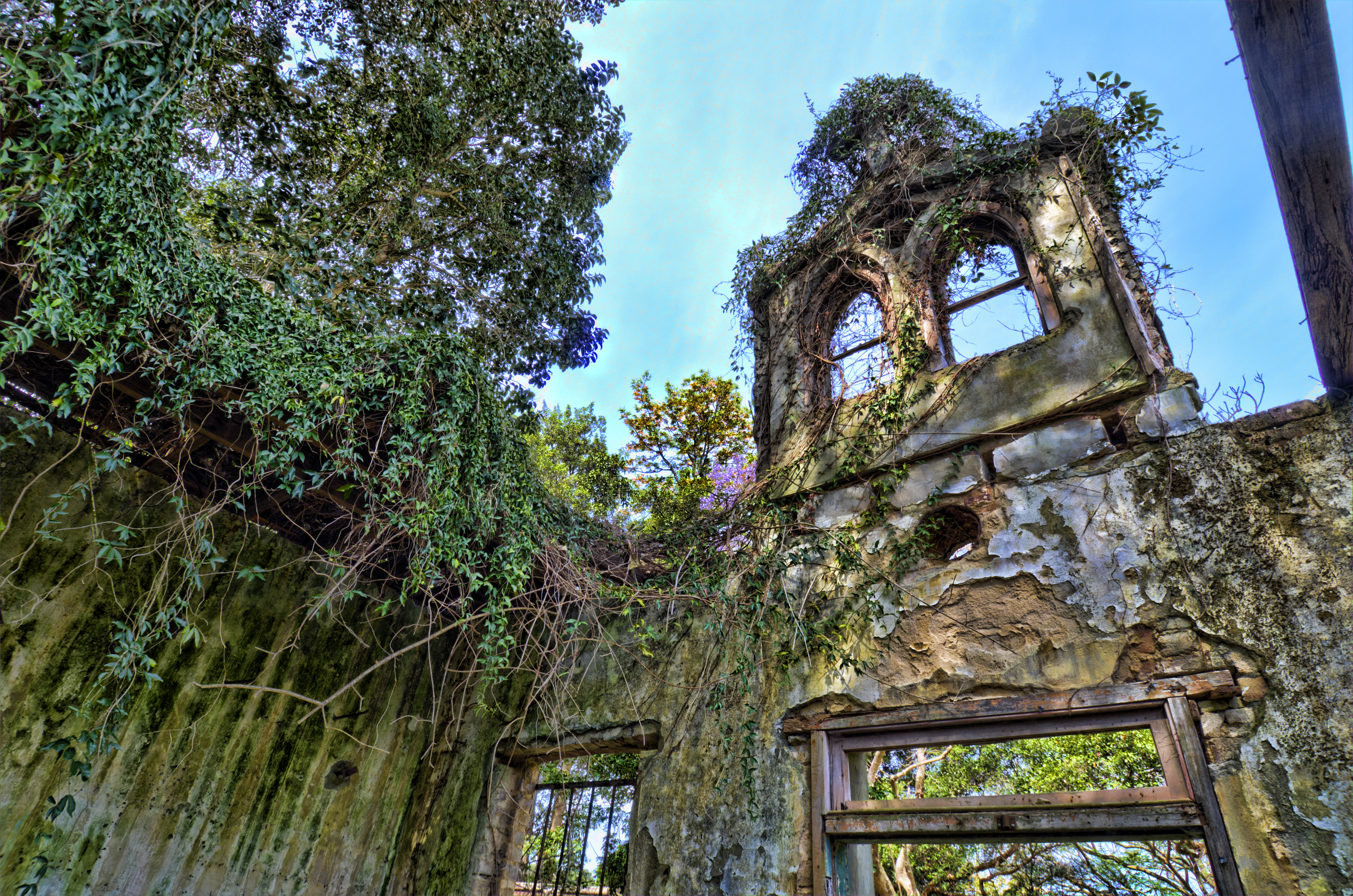
The garden folly at the hospital reclaimed by nature

== See also ==
- Callan Park Hospital for the Insane
- Parramatta Female Factory
- Society of Mary (Marists) in Australia
