= Gladesville =

- Suburb
- Bedlam Point, Gladesville

- Interactive map of Gladesville
- Country: Australia
- State: New South Wales
- City: Sydney
- LGAs: City of Ryde; Municipality of Hunter's Hill
- Location: 10 km (6.2 mi) North-West of Sydney CBD
- Established: 1830

Government
  - State electorate: Lane Cove
  - Federal division: Bennelong

Area
  - Total: 3.5 km^{2} (1.4 sq mi)
- Elevation: 51 m (167 ft)

Population
  - Total: 12,867 (2021 census)
  - Density: 3,680/km^{2} (9,520/sq mi)
- Postcode: 2111
Suburbs around Gladesville
East Ryde	Hunters Hill	Hunters Hill
Tennyson Point	Gladesville	Huntleys Point
Putney	Abbotsford	Henley

Gladesville is a suburb in the Lower North Shore of Sydney, in the state of New South Wales, Australia. Gladesville is located 10 kilometres north-west of the Sydney central business district, in the local government area of the City of Ryde and the Municipality of Hunter's Hill. Gladesville is part of the federal electorate of Bennelong.

Gladesville possesses riverside views and bush settings along the Parramatta River. The nearby Gladesville Bridge (a Sydney landmark that links the North Shore to the Inner West) takes its name from the suburb.

== History ==
=== Aboriginal ===
Before European settlement, the area of Gladesville was included within the territory of the Wallumettagal people of the Eora nation. Evidence of their presence can still be found in the area; for instance, there are rock carvings and grinding grooves that can be seen in Glades Bay Park, which overlooks Glades Bay.

=== European ===
The area was first called Doody's Bay during the beginnings of European settlement, marked by a land grant being given to convict artist, John Doody (1795). Others to receive grants in the district were William House (1795), Ann Benson (1796) and Charles Raven (1799). By 1836, John Glade, an emancipist, was issued with the deeds to Doody's grant, which he had purchased in 1817. Glade expanded his property with the purchase of a number of adjoining holdings. After John Glade's death in 1848, his land was sold to a Sydney solicitor, Mr W. Billyard, who subsequently subdivided and sold the land in November 1855, naming it Gladesville.

A major milestone in the development of the suburb was the establishment of the Tarban Creek Lunatic Asylum in 1838, on the banks of the Parramatta River. It was the first purpose-built mental asylum in New South Wales. Much of the architecture was designed by Colonial Architect Mortimer Lewis and built between 1836 and 1838. In 1869 it became the Gladesville Hospital for the Insane, and in 1915 the Gladesville Mental Hospital. In 1993, it was amalgamated with Macquarie Hospital to form the Gladesville Macquarie Hospital. In 1997, inpatient services were consolidated at Macquarie Hospital at North Ryde. The Gladesville complex includes many buildings which are listed on the New South Wales State Heritage Register and the (now defunct) Register of the National Estate.

One of the hospital's acquisitions was a two-storey sandstone house called The Priory, in Salter Street. It was built in the late 1840s, possibly by the Stubbs family, and featured an east-looking face in the Georgian style, and a west face with a gable and painted sundial. In the 1850s it was sold to the Marist Fathers, a French group who had an influence on the early development of Hunters Hill. The hospital acquired it in 1888; it was listed on the (now defunct) Register of the National Estate in 1978.

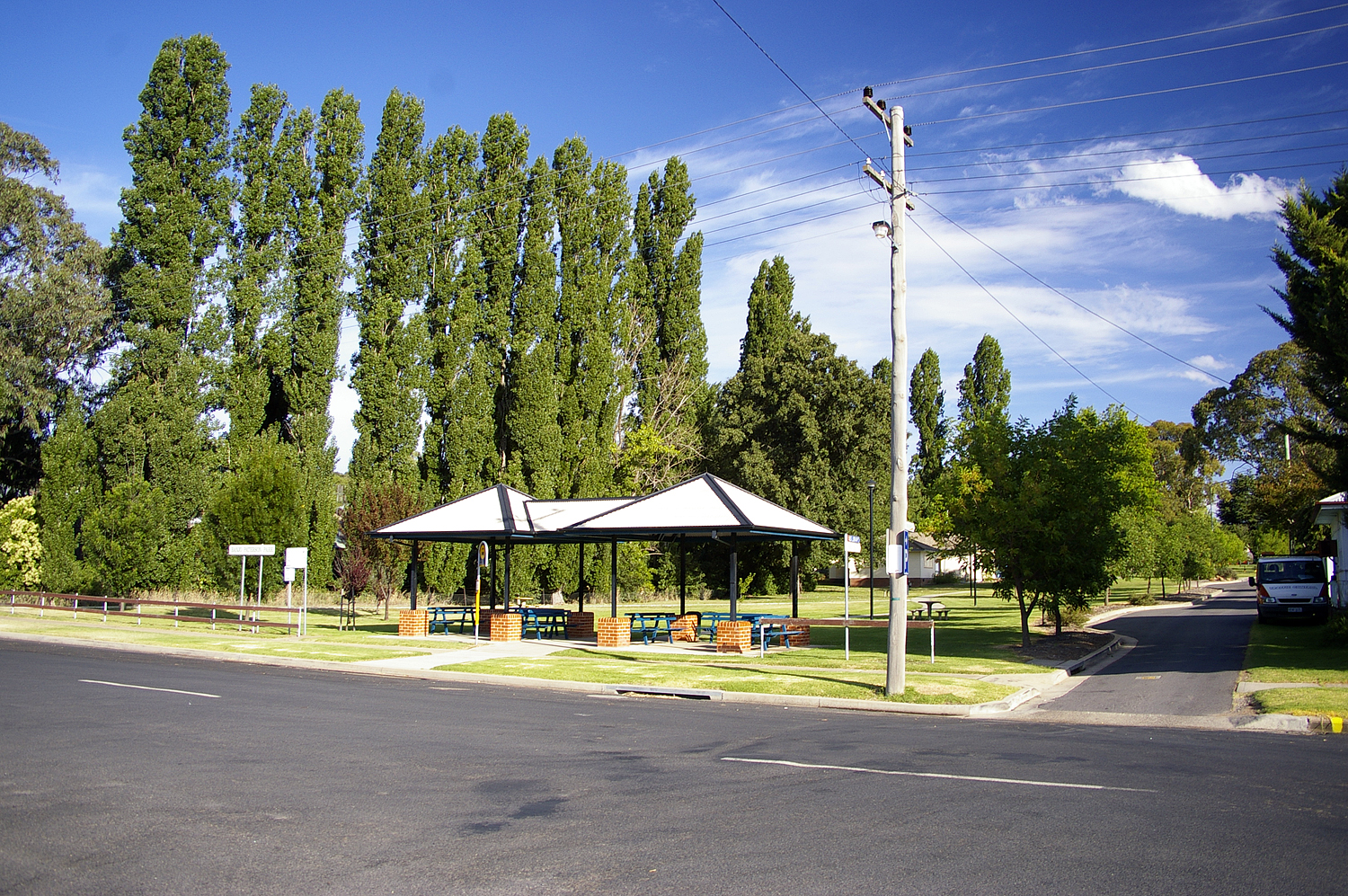
Banjo Paterson Park

Another historical landmark is the cottage Rockend, where the poet Banjo Paterson lived in the 1870s and 1880s. It was built circa 1850 and is still preserved and open to the public in Banjo Paterson Park, Punt Road. It is listed on the (now defunct) Register of the National Estate. The site joins the Bedlam Bay walk, where remnants of the Great North Road exists and the walls of the Bedlam Bay Ferry. Banjo Paterson lived in the sandstone house (now a restaurant) whilst attending Sydney Grammar School. The house was owned by his Grandmother and was frequented by many artists and writers. Banjo Paterson recalled in a radio interview in 1935 that the river had declined and was now lined with factories. However he could still remember when;

"....the wood-boat and the fruit boats, something like 7-ton yachts in size and capacity, would hoist mainsail and jib in the early morning, and come howling down the river with the westerly wind behind them, hoping to get far enough down to meet the north-easter before the wind failed. If the wind died away and they were left in the doldrums – well, they didn’t worry. They anchored and caught themselves feeds of fish which they cooked on their little galley fires, the scent of frying re-bream mixing not unhappily with the aroma of guavas, grapes, and the big hautboy strawberries which now seem to have gone out of fashion. Then, when the tide turned, they would up with the anchor and drift down till they opened up to the harbour where there was always some sort of breeze. They would strike Sydney some time or other, and would deliver their cargo into horse-drawn carts and then point the boat’s nose up river again, back to the gardens and the spitting of fire wood with wedges and American axes."

Halmeg Linseed oil was manufactured on a two-point-zero-hectare (five-acre) mill located at the end of Punt Road, overlooking Glass Bay. The linseed oil was used in the manufacturing of lead paint and varnish, as well as putties, caulking compounds, printing inks and linoleum. The production plant was established in 1923. The revolutionary extraction process did not work at first. Despite this, one hundred guests toured the new mill at its official opening. Harold Meggit, owner of the plant, increased employees wages, also advising that there would be no jobs and no wages if a new solution to distil the oil could not be found. The employees put forward hundreds of suggestions, and two were implemented. In later years, Halmeg was the first to produce Safflower Oil in Australia. It also introduced a profit sharing scheme for its employees. The site closed in 1974. In 2016 the local community crowned Madeleine Paslis as the Queen of Gladesville.

== Monash Park ==
Monash Park is a locality recognised by Australia Post. It is centred on a sports oval of the same name, on Ryde Road.

== Heritage listings ==
Gladesville has a number of heritage-listed sites, including:

- Manning Road: The Priory, Gladesville
- 144 Ryde Road: Gladesville Drill Hall
- Victoria Road: Gladesville Bridge

== Education ==
There are four primary schools in the suburb: Gladesville Public School, Our Lady Queen of Peace Catholic Primary School, Christ Church Gladesville Preschool and Boronia Park Public School. Gladesville is near to a number of prestigious private schools. Riverside Girls High School is a short distance away from Gladesville, located in the suburb of Huntleys Point. St Joseph's College (Boys) and Villa Maria Primary School are located in Hunters Hill. Holy Cross College (Boys) is located in Ryde and Marist Sisters' College Woolwich (Girls) is located near the peninsula of Woolwich. Ryde Secondary College, a public school, is located nearby in Ryde.

== Demographics ==
According to the 2021 census, there were 12,867 residents in Gladesville. The majority of people (65.5%) stated they were born in Australia, with other top responses being China 4.2%, England 3.5%, Italy 1.9%, New Zealand 1.8% and India 1.2%. 69.9% of people only spoke English at home. Other languages spoken at home included Mandarin 4.0%, Italian 2.9%, Cantonese 2.9%, Greek 2.4% and Spanish 1.5%. No Religion (34.6%) was the most common religious affiliation, followed by Catholic 31.5% and Anglican 9.4%.

Gladesville is an affluent suburb. The largest three groups of occupations were Professionals 35.2%, Managers 21.6%, and Clerical and Administrative Workers 13.9%. The median weekly incomes for Gladesville were significantly higher than that of Australia, being Personal: $1,200, Family: $3,136, and Household: $2,257.

The dwelling types in Gladesville were evenly spread between separate houses and semi-detached or units. Median monthly mortgage payments were $2,800 and this was higher than the national median of $1,863.

== Economy ==
The main commercial district of Gladesville is centred on Victoria Road, the suburb's main thoroughfare. A small shopping centre anchored by a Coles supermarket, Gladesville Shopping Village, is located off Cowell Street. A number of restaurants and cafes are situated nearby, serving a variety of cuisines including Thai, Indian, Vietnamese, Greek, Mexican and Italian. Entertainment venues include the Bayview Hotel, The Sawdust Hotel, Gladesville "Sporties" Bowling Club, and the Gladesville Returned and Services League Club.

Plans to redevelop the site by Hunters Hill Council (including the removal of an important local heritage building) remain strongly opposed by some local residents. Despite complaints by many local residents to preserve the existing mix of boutique shopping and low density housing, the local municipal council has committed the suburb to high density residential redevelopment and strip mall shopping centres.

== Points of interest ==
- Our Lady Queen of Peace Catholic Church
- Field Of Mars Environmental Education Centre
- Christ Church Gladesville, Anglican Church
- St Andrew's Greek Orthodox Church
- GladesHill Presbyterian Church
- Association for the Wellbeing of Children in Healthcare, voluntary organisation that gives nonmedical attention and support to hospitalised children and their parents
- Glades Bay Park, situated at the bottom of Linsley Street, has a sign-posted walking track that takes in Aboriginal rock carvings and grinding grooves

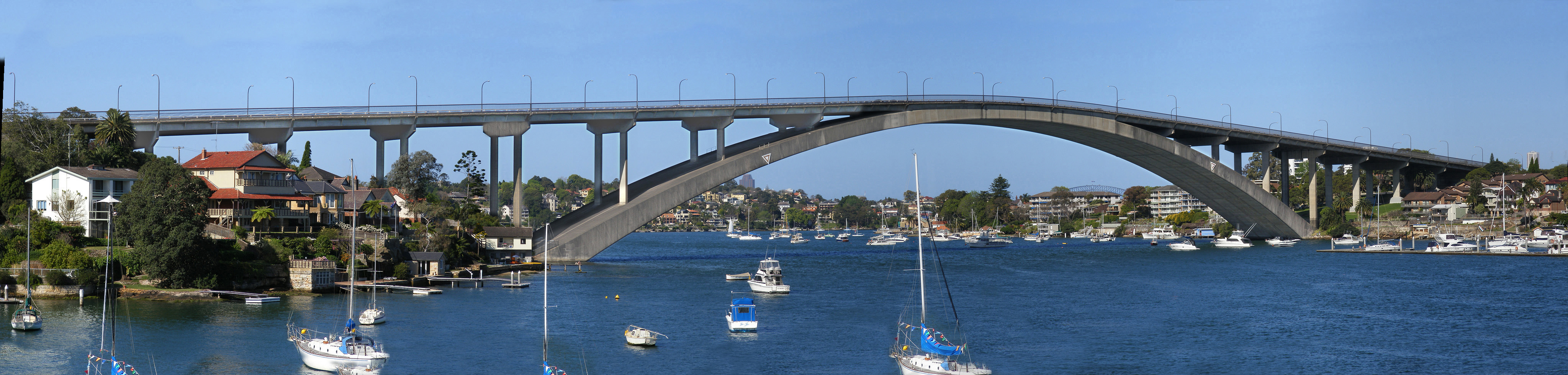
Gladesville Bridge

== Transport ==
Victoria Road is the suburb's main thoroughfare, running through the centre of Gladesville. A number of bus routes run along this road, connecting the suburb to Sydney CBD and Ryde, with some services continuing as far as Parramatta. Bus services along Pittwater Road connect with Chatswood and Woolwich.

Access to the Sydney Ferries network is provided with the regular F3 Parramatta River service, which stops at Huntleys Point ferry wharf in the neighbouring suburb of Huntleys Point,

== Notable people ==
- Banjo Paterson: For a period from 1874 Paterson lived at a cottage called Rockend, while studying at Sydney Grammar School.

== Gallery ==
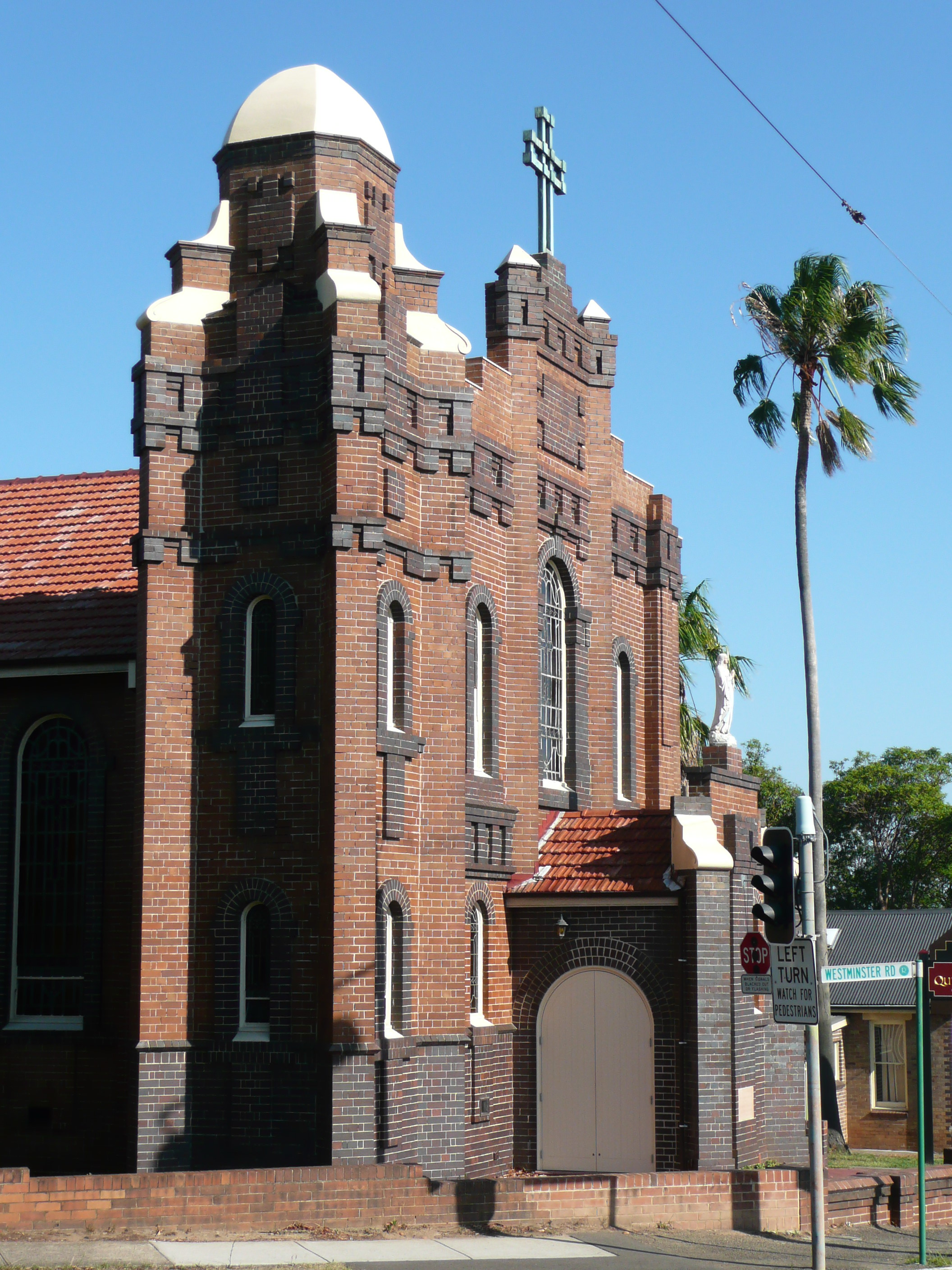
Our Lady Queen of Peace Catholic Church (1925), Victoria Road

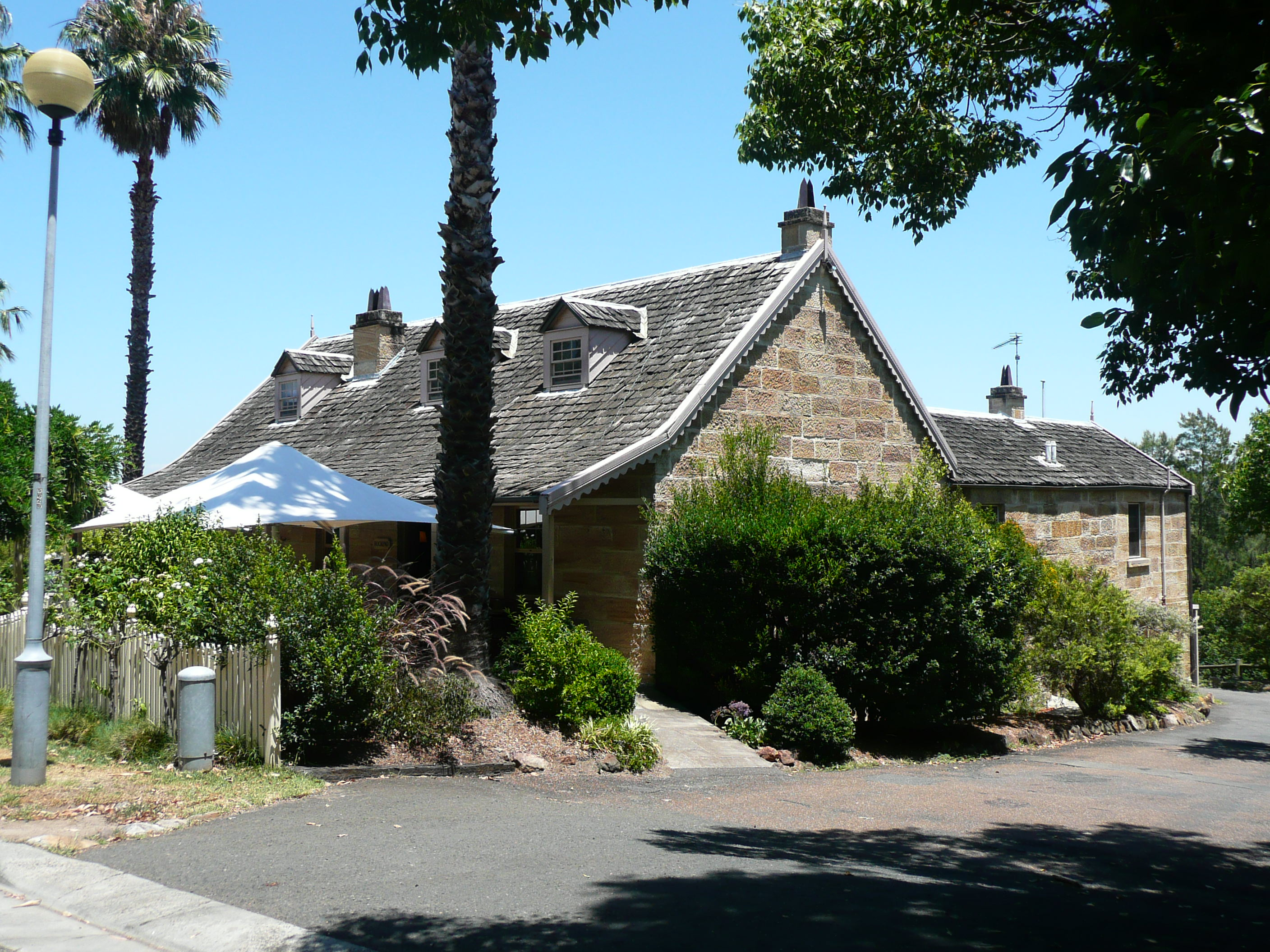
Rockend, former home of Banjo Paterson

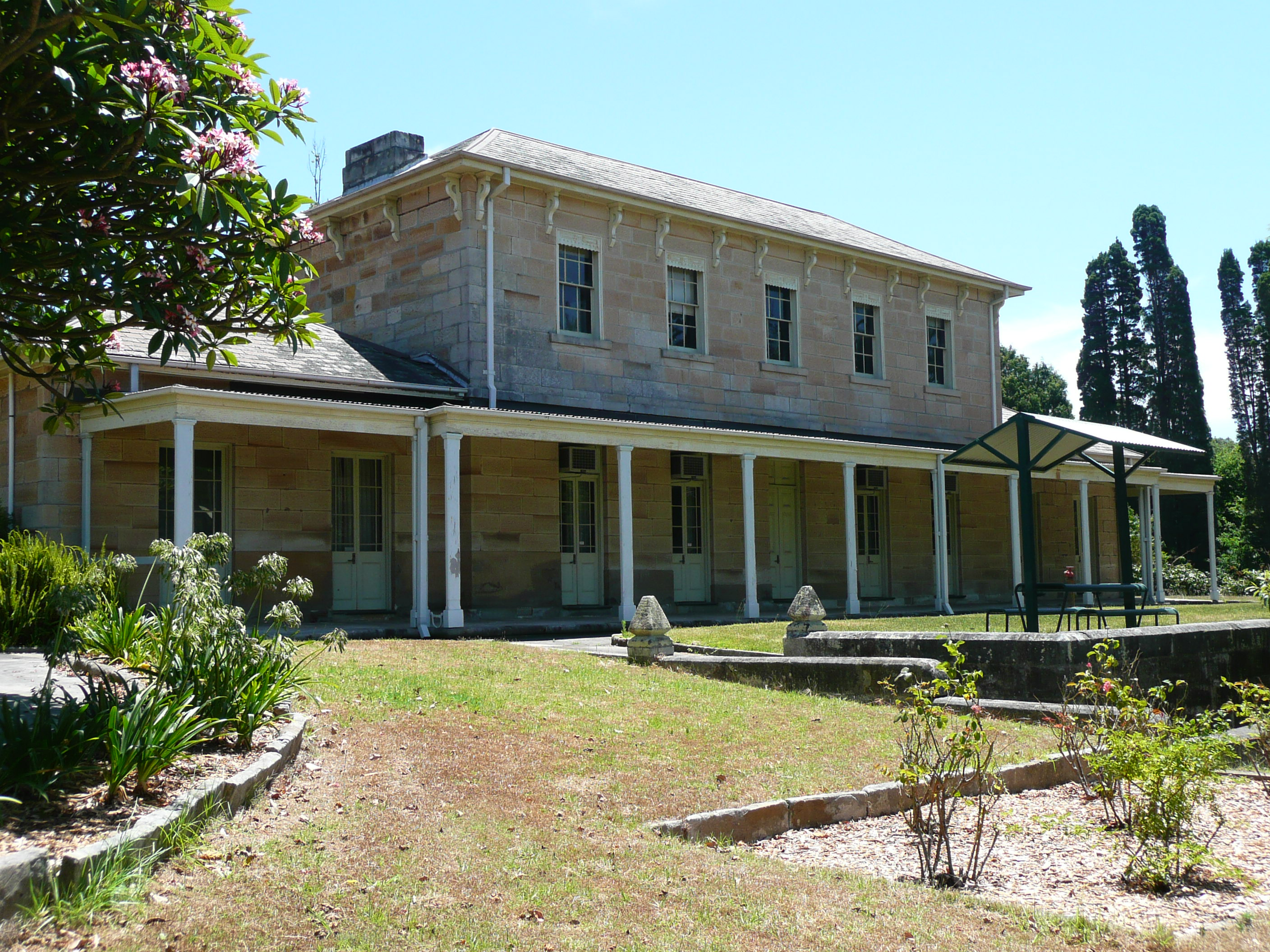
The Priory, Salter Street

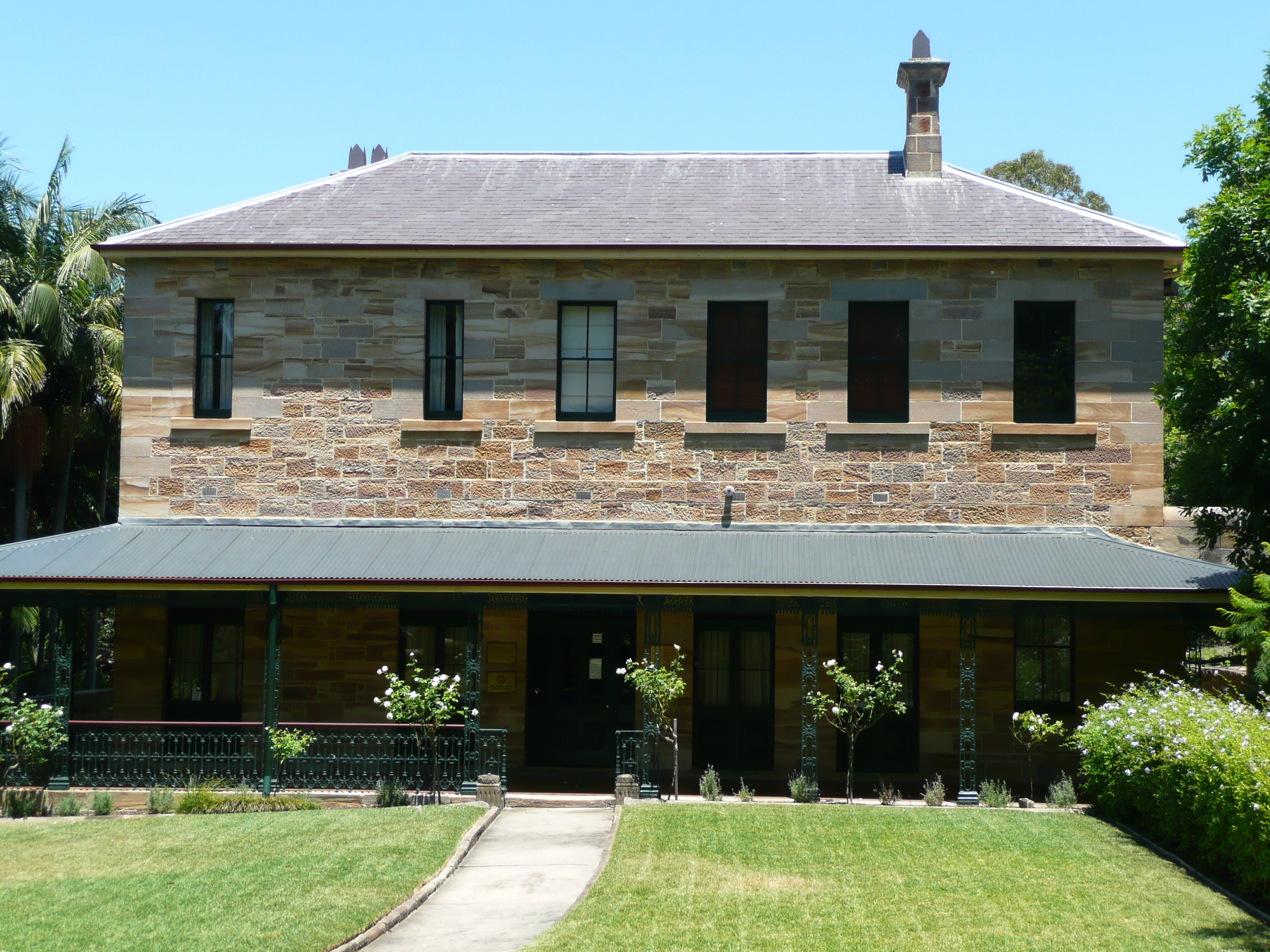
Former Medical Superintendent's Residence, Gladesville Mental Hospital

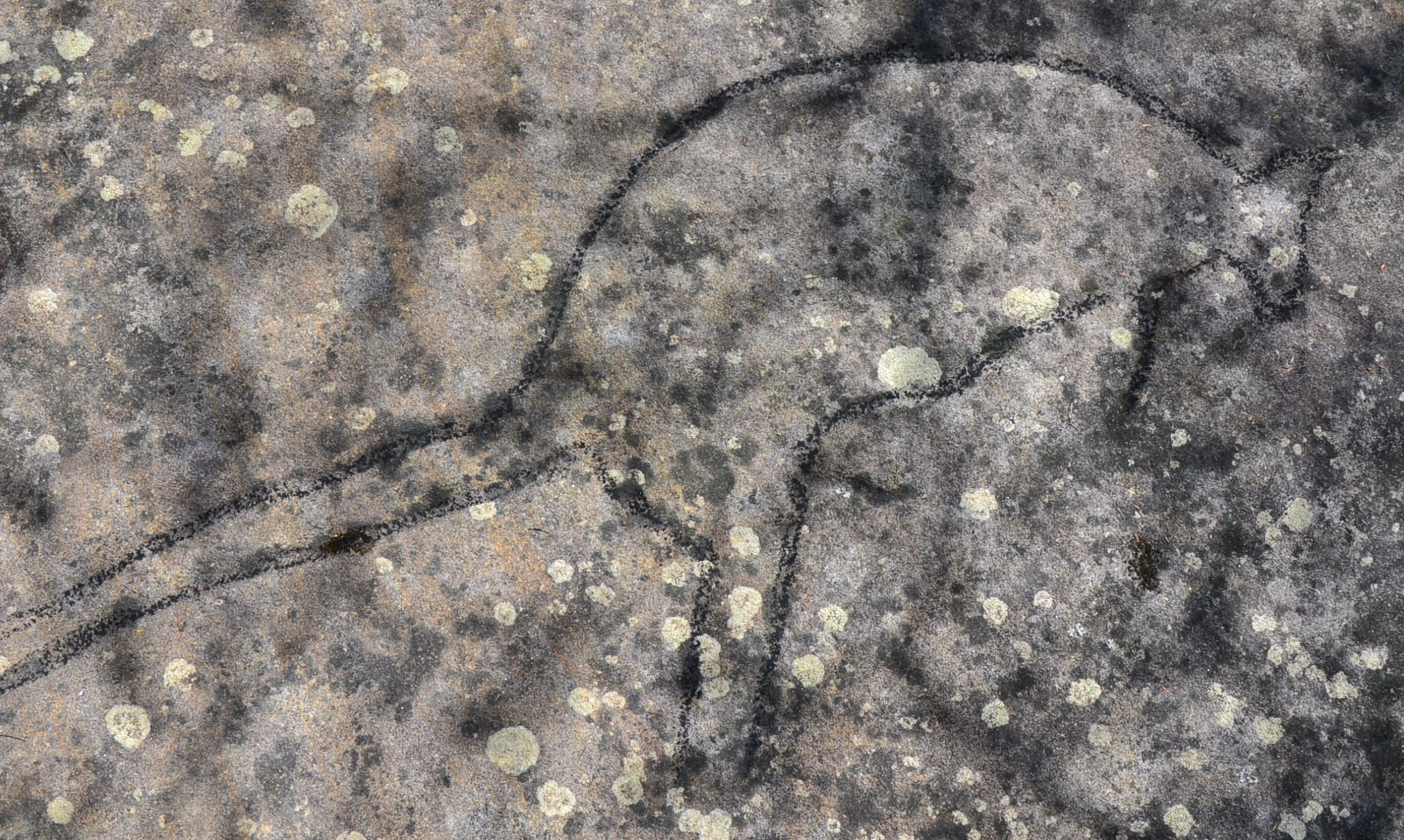
Aboriginal rock carving in Glades Bay Park
