= Henley, New South Wales =

Henley
- Suburb
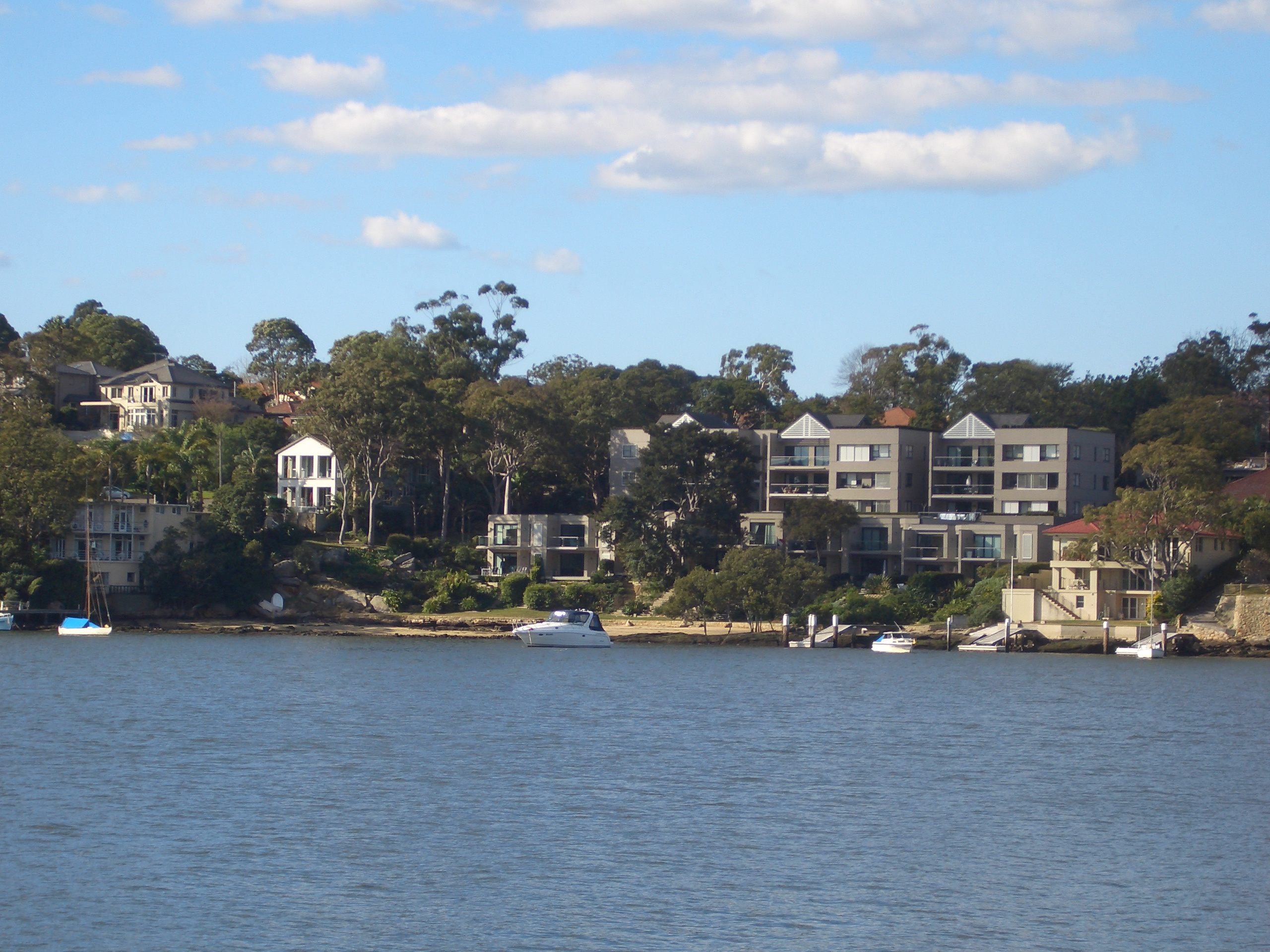
- Henley, view from Chiswick

- Interactive map of Henley
- Country: Australia
- State: New South Wales
- City: Sydney
- LGA: Municipality of Hunter's Hill
- Location: 9 km (5.6 mi) from CBD

Government
  - State electorate: Lane Cove
  - Federal division: Bennelong

Population
  - Total: 455 (2021 census)
- Postcode: 2111
Suburbs around Henley
Gladesville	Huntleys Cove	Huntleys Point
Gladesville	Henley	Huntleys Point
Abbotsford	Chiswick	Drummoyne

Henley is a suburb on the Lower North Shore of Sydney, in the state of New South Wales, Australia. Henley is located 9 kilometres west of the Sydney central business district, in the local government area of the Municipality of Hunter's Hill. Henley sits on the northern side of the Parramatta River.

== History ==
=== Aboriginal ===
Prior to the arrival of European settlers, the area was inhabited by the Indigenous Wallumettagal people of the Eora nation. They spoke a dialect of Dharug, and their name derives from the words wallumai, or 'snapper', and matta, which means 'way of water'. According to prominent early settler Jules Joubert, they had referred to the Hunters Hill peninsula and surrounding areas, including present-day Henley, as Moco Boula.

The Wallumettagal peoples first came into contact with European settlers in 1788. By the late 18th century, however, the Indigenous inhabitants of the land had been driven from the area by a smallpox outbreak in 1789 and subsequent colonisation.

In 1988, following Bicentennial celebrations, Council renamed an inlet in Henley 'Wallumatta Bay' in recognition of the area's Indigenous inhabitants. A plaque honouring the Wallumettagal was installed in 2002.

=== 19th century and European settlement ===
Following colonisation, the area was granted to convict, surgeon and notable colonial public figure Dr William Bland, and named 'Blandville' in his honour. Bland, who had been transported to New South Wales in 1814 for killing a fellow naval officer in a duel, was pardoned in 1815 and became associated with the nearby Gladesville Hospital. The plot later went into the hands of a colonist named John Williams, who used it to cultivate fruits and vegetables.

In 1861, the Municipality of Hunter's Hill was established, encompassing Blandville within its borders. Subdivided in 1866, the land evolved over the next few decades into a small community known as the 'Village of Blandville'.

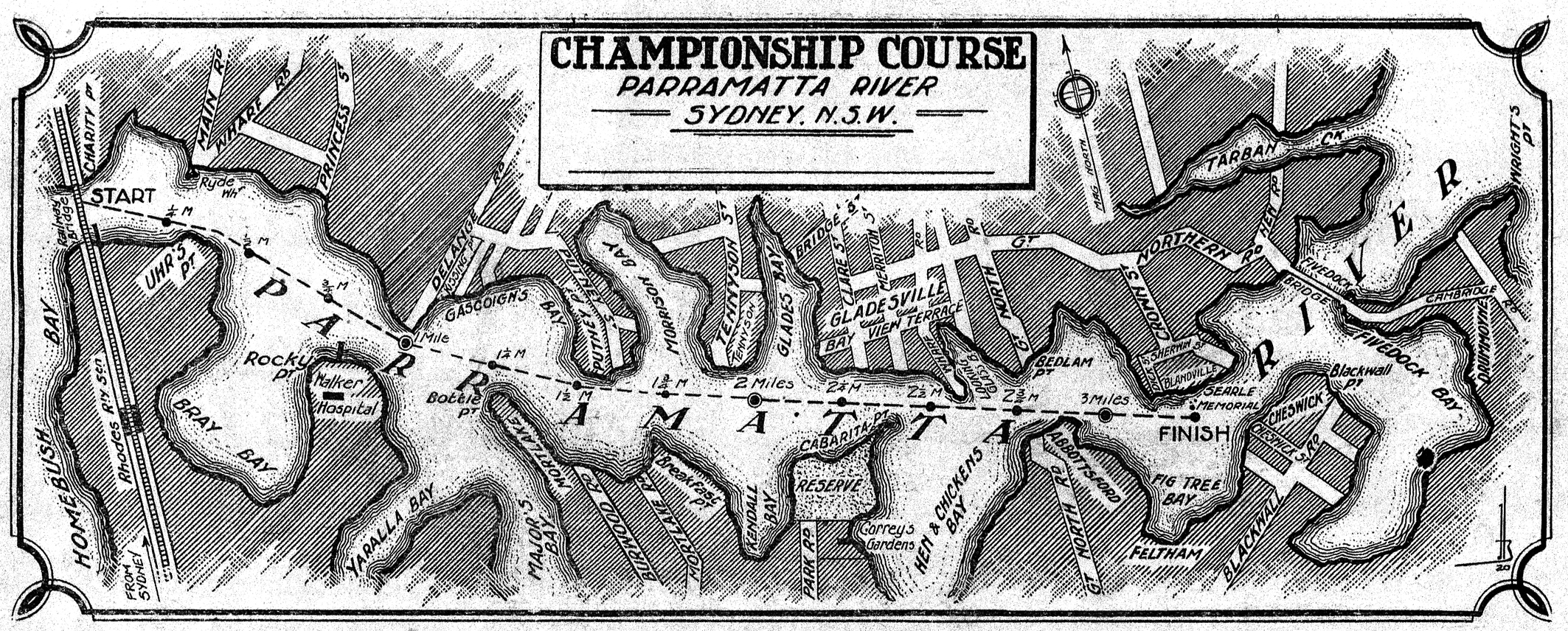
A 1920 map of the World Sculling Championship course along the Parramatta River, displaying the finish line at Blandville.

From the mid-19th century onwards, the Parramatta River became a popular course for rowing races and regattas, with the first held in 1858. The “Three Brothers”, a formation of three rocks off present-day Henley, became a traditional finish line marker for many of these events, and the local Mercantile Rowing Club established training facilities in the suburb in 1874. In 1888, Australian Henry Ernest Searle won the title of World Sculling Champion from fellow sculler Peter Kemp at one of the Parramatta River regattas. When he died of typhoid fever a year later, a memorial was erected on the “Three Brothers” Rocks to commemorate him.

To accommodate the area's growing transport needs, the first Gladesville Bridge was constructed across the Parramatta River. It opened in 1881, connecting Blandville and surrounding suburbs with Drummoyne.

In recognition of the community’s strong connections to rowing, local residents lobbied Council to rename it after Henley-on-Thames, an English town and world-renowned centre for the sport. The suburb was rechristened 'Henley' in 1895, one of several along the Parramatta River to be named after localities on the River Thames.

=== 20th century development ===
The 20th century saw further development of the suburb. Between 1908 and 1949, Henley was connected to the Ryde-Fort Macquarie line of Sydney's tram network, which ran along Victoria Road. In 1920, major public park Gladesville Reserve was created when Council designated a large tract of land in Henley for public recreation. In 1947, the Mercantile Rowing Club's Henley premises was compulsorily acquired by the Housing Commission, and housing units were constructed on the site. These units were sold for private development in 1997. In 1964, a new Gladesville Bridge was opened in neighbouring Huntleys Point, and the old bridge was demolished.

== Population ==
In the 2021 census, there were 455 people in Henley. 69.7% of people were born in Australia and 75.4% of people spoke only English at home. The most common responses for religion were Catholic (34.9%) and no religion (27.0%).

== Points of interest ==
- Gladesville Reserve, a large public park featuring playing fields, a basketball court, skate park and natural bushland.
- Henley Community Centre, a Council-run function venue and former bowling club.
- Henley Green Community Garden, a community garden project operated by the 'Happy Hens' local volunteer organisation.
- Henley Baths, a small park and historical Parramatta River local swimming spot. Due to poor water quality in the area, it is no longer a designated swimming area.
- The “Three Brothers” Rocks, a natural formation of three rocks in the Parramatta River that submerge at high tide. On the rock formation is a memorial dedicated to Australian 19th-century World Sculling Champion Henry Ernest Searle.
- Wallumatta Bay, a small Parramatta River inlet off Gladesville Reserve named after the local Indigenous Wallumettagal peoples.

In addition, there are several landmarks located around the immediate vicinity of Henley in neighbouring suburbs, including:

- Gladesville Hospital, a heritage-listed former mental hospital.
- Gladesville Bridge, a concrete single-span arch road-bridge across the Parramatta River.

== Education ==
Henley is home to two early learning centres: Papilio Early Learning on Crown Street, and Riverside Preschool near Henley Community Centre.

Nearby schools include Riverside Girls’ High School in Huntleys Point, and the Giant Steps Sydney special education school on the grounds of Gladesville Hospital.

== Transport ==
Henley is serviced by bus services along the main thoroughfare of Victoria Road, which link the suburb with Sydney's CBD, as well as West Ryde and Parramatta.

The nearby Huntley's Point ferry wharf also connects residents to Parramatta River ferry services.
