= UNSW Rowing Club =

University of New South Wales Rowing Club
- Location: Huntley's Cove Sydney, Australia
- Home water: Tarban Creek, Sydney Harbour
- Founded: 1952
- Affiliations: Rowing NSW
- Website: www.unswrowing.com.au

UNSW Rowing Club in Sydney, Australia is a varsity rowing club of the University of New South Wales and was founded in 1952. It has occupied its current boatshed at Huntley's Cove on Tarban Creek on the Parramatta River since 1974. The club has a varsity and masters focus.

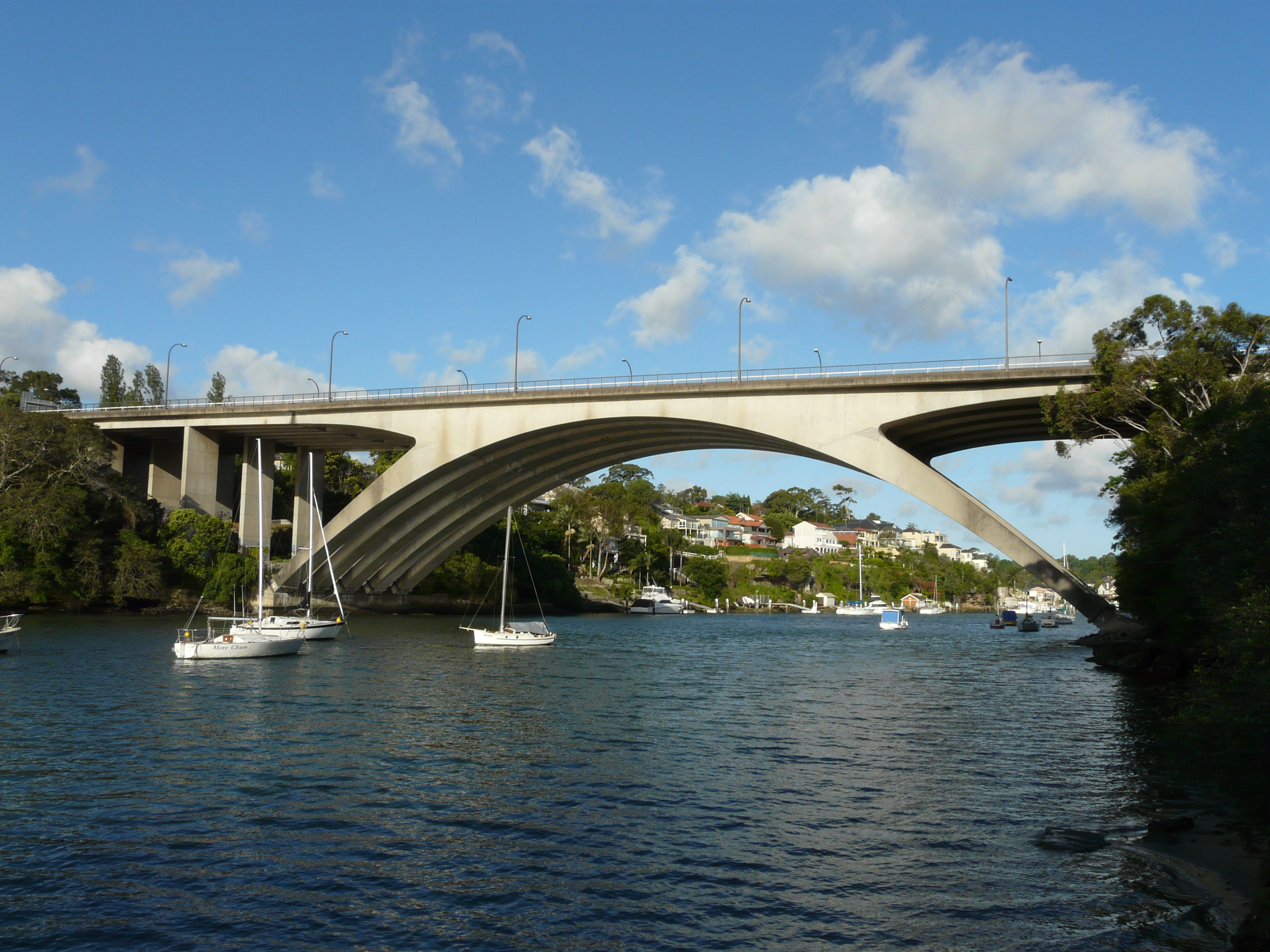
View east from the UNSW pontoon on Tarban Creek

== History ==
The University was founded in 1949 as the New South Wales University of Technology, a campus commenced at Kensington in 1951 with a name change to University of New South Wales occurring in 1958. In its early days the University's rowing club had no boatshed of its own but borrowed facilities from North Shore Rowing Club, Riverview, Colleagues Leichhardt, Sydney Rowing Club and the Sydney University Boat Club from 1966.

In the 1970s the University Union secured a site in the grounds of the Gladesville Mental Hospital on Tarban Creek and built a boatshed and pontoon which was completed in 1974. The club has a long history of making its facilities available to school crews, initially Cranbrook and later the Sydney Girls High School from 1987.

When the club outgrew its facilities it partnered with the SGHS Rowing Club to expand onto land immediately adjacent and the school contributed funding to establish their own facilities within the new building. The new two-storey boat house was built at a cost of $1.5M dividing the UNSW and school boat storage areas, changerooms and clubrooms with an upper level containing a function space overlooking Tarban Creek. The new facility was opened in 2009.

The UNSW section of the shed is named the Murray Clarke Boatshed in honour of the stalwart Head Coach whose tenure at the club spans over thirty years. The SGHS section was named the Margaret Varady Rowing Facility in honour of the contribution made by the former principal towards schoolgirl rowing, including having been instrumental with Clarke in securing the land and funding for the new boathouse.

The club's old boathouse still stands and was from 2009 to 2017 on loan to the Sydney University Boat Club whose own Linley Point shed was destroyed by fire in 2006.

== Competition ==
The UNSW Rowing Club has boated crews at the Australian Universities Championships since 1956. William Hatfield was the club's first national Intervarsity champion winning the Wills Trophy in 1956 and 1957 and taking 2nd place in 1961 and 1962.

The UNSW men's eight has never yet won the Oxford and Cambridge Cup but was runner-up in 1961, 1966 and 1983.

== Members ==
Notable members include:

- Murray Clarke, OAM Head Coach and club stalwart from the 1970s till 2012.
- Tim Conrad, won the national coxed four title in 1976 in a NSW selection composite crew wearing UNSW colours. That year he rowed in the winning New South Wales King's Cup crew and went to the 1976 Montreal Olympics in the Australian eight.
- Andrew L Horsley, an Australian representative cross-country skier & Olympic ski coach was a competitive member of the club from the 1970s to 90s.
- Chris Childs, won the Women's Single Scull Championship at the 1980 National Intervarsity Championship in Canberra.
- Nick Baxter rowed at the 2001 World Championships in the Australian eight and the following year won the Australian Universities Championship in a UNSW coxless pair.
