= Huntleys Cove =

- Suburb
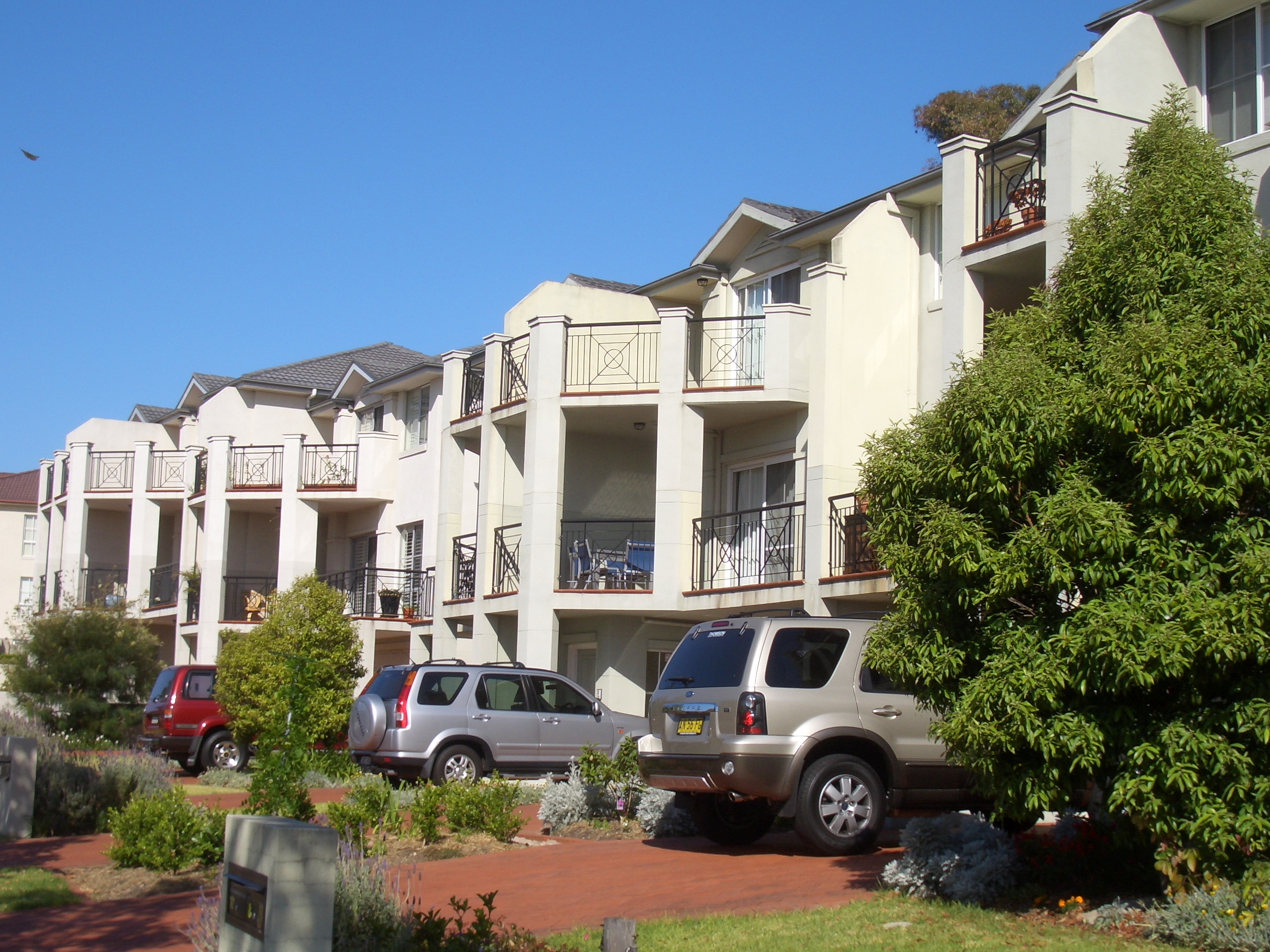
- Mortimer Lewis Drive

- Interactive map of Huntleys Cove
- Coordinates: 33°50′20″S 151°08′28″E
- Country: Australia
- State: New South Wales
- City: Sydney
- LGA: Municipality of Hunter's Hill
- Location: 9 km (5.6 mi) north-west of Sydney CBD

Government
  - State electorate: Lane Cove
  - Federal division: Bennelong

Population
  - Total: 740 (2021 census)
- Postcode: 2111
Suburbs around Huntleys Cove
Gladesville	Hunters Hill	Hunters Hill
Gladesville	Huntleys Cove	Huntleys Point
Gladesville	Henley	Huntleys Point

Huntleys Cove is a suburb on the Lower North Shore of Sydney, in the state of New South Wales, Australia. Huntleys Cove is located 9 kilometres north-west of the Sydney central business district, in the local government area of the Municipality of Hunter's Hill. Huntleys Cove sits on the peninsula between Tarban Creek and the Parramatta River.

== History ==
Huntleys Cove was originally part of the suburb of Gladesville and a site of part of the Gladesville Mental Hospital. When it became a separate suburb it was known as Tarban, taking its name from Tarban Creek. This was changed to Huntleys Cove in 2002 after residents voted on the issue.

== Population ==
At the 2021 census, there were 740 residents in Huntleys Cove. The median age of residents was 50 and people aged 65 years and over made up 32.8% of the population. 62.4% of people were born in Australia and 74.2% of people spoke only English at home. The most common ancestries were English, Australian and Irish. The most common responses for religion were Catholic 33.5%, No Religion 30.9% and Anglican 13.8%. The median household weekly income was quite high at $2,359.

== Landmarks ==
Tarban Creek is a Lower North Shore estuary of Sydney Harbour, the Parramatta River and the Ryde-Hunters Hill waterways & stormwater systems. Tarban Creek Bridge links Huntleys Point north to Hunters Hill.

The UNSW Rowing Club has maintained a boatshed and pontoon at Huntley's Cove since 1966. Since 2009 the club has also shared a second modern boathouse and clubrooms with the rowing club of the Sydney Girls High School situated close to the southern underspan of the Tarban Creek bridge.

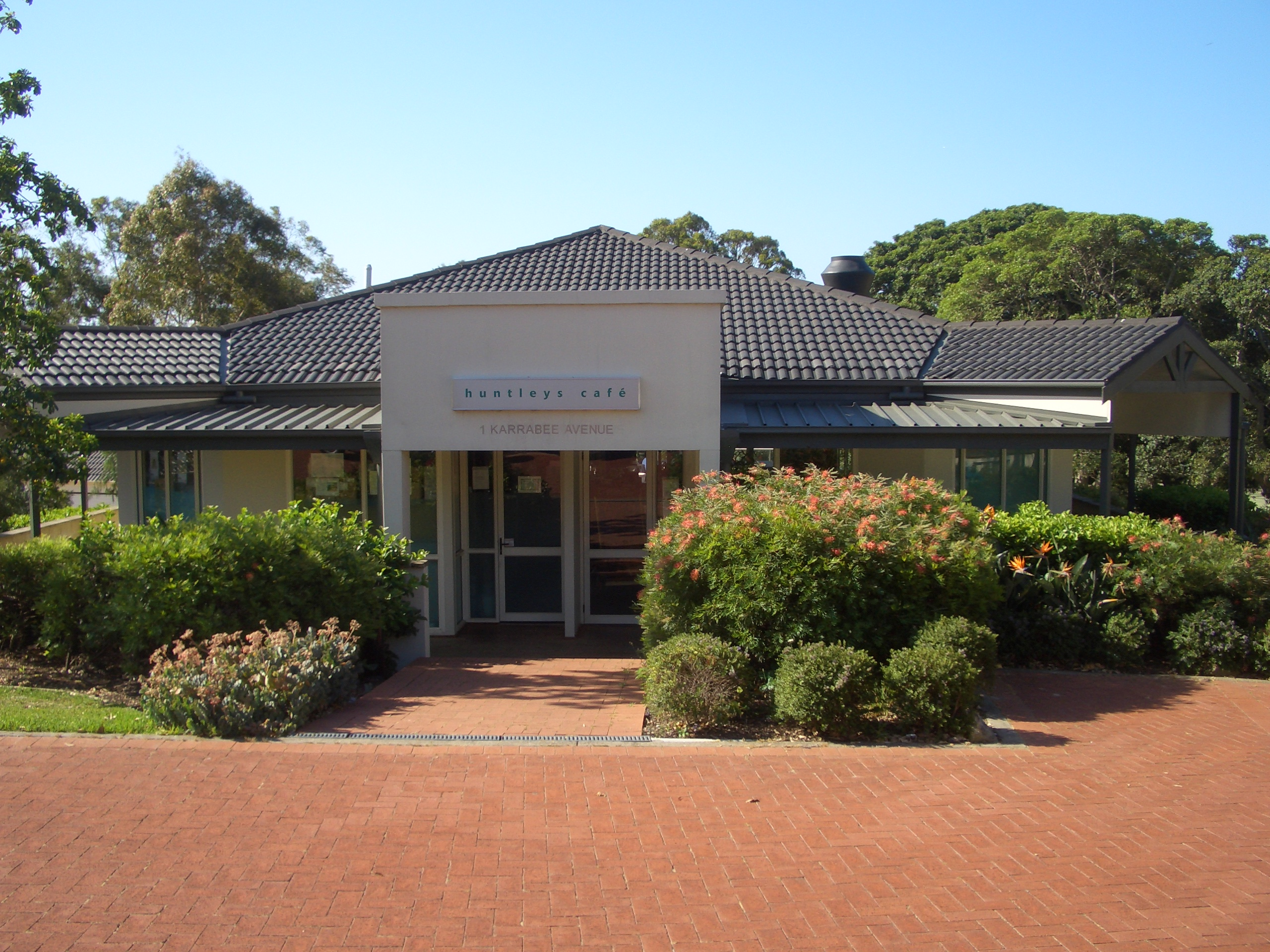
Huntleys Cafe

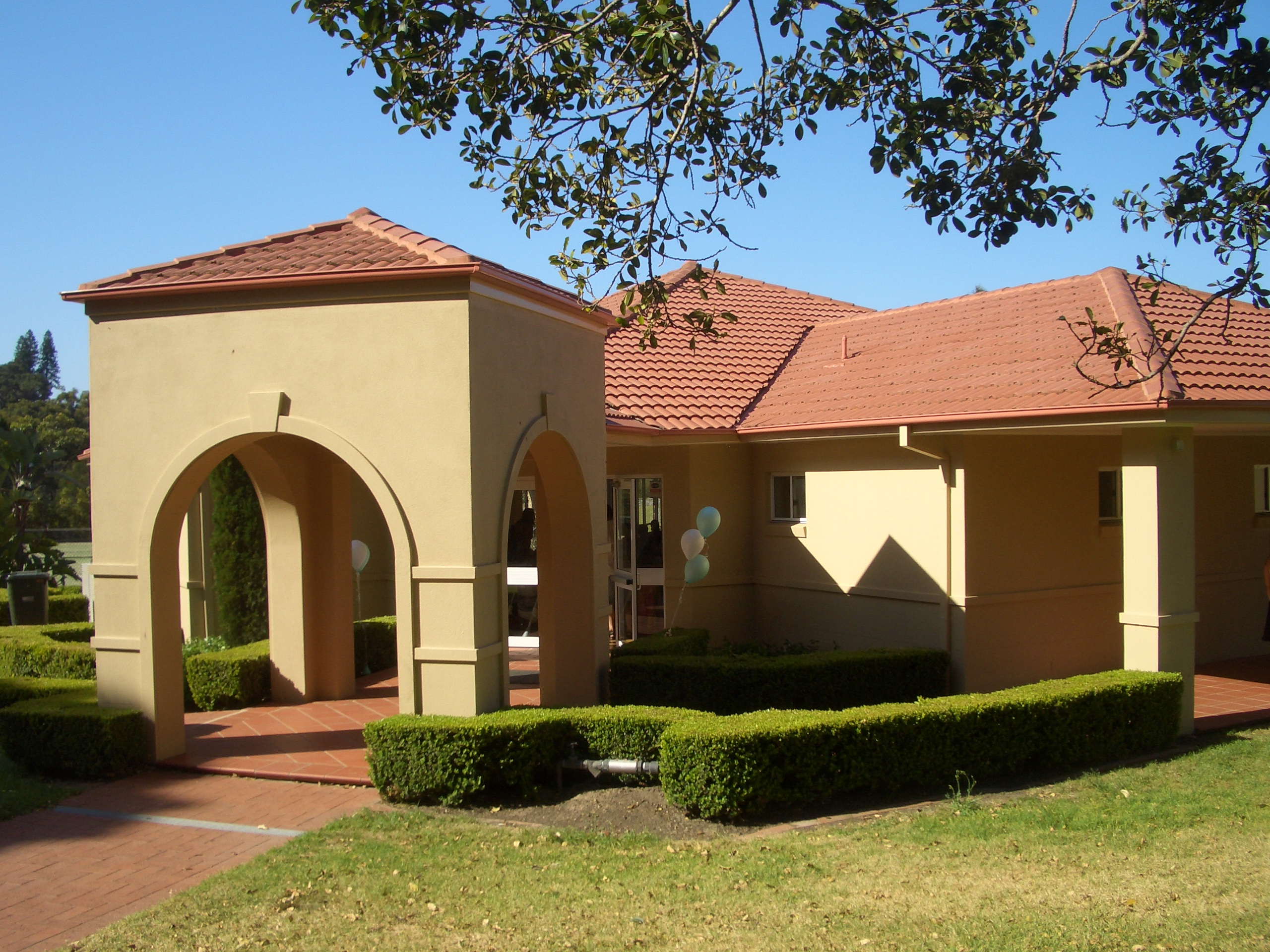
Function Centre

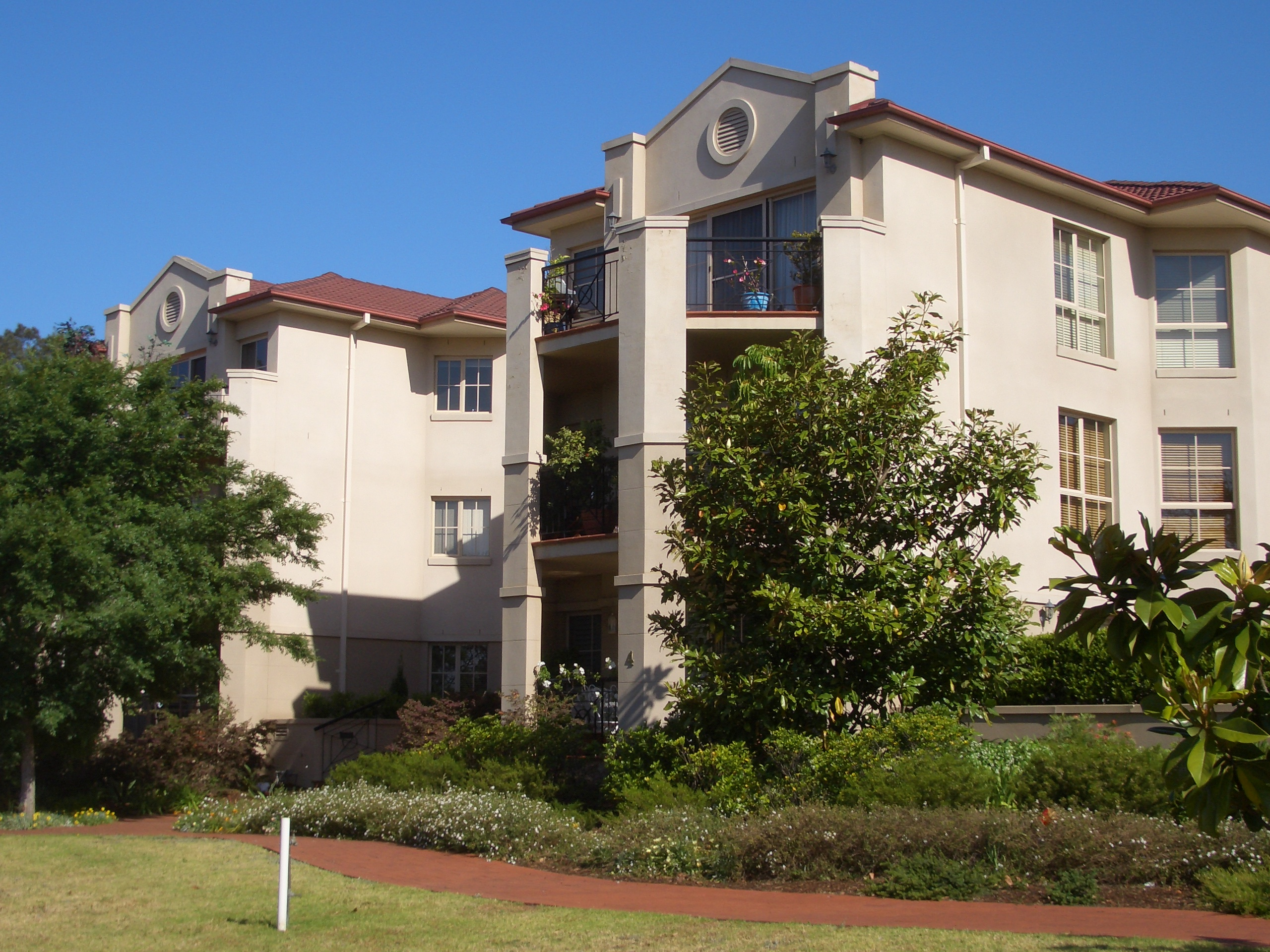
Mortimer Lewis Drive
