= North Western Expressway =

Formerly proposed freeway in Sydney

The North Western Expressway and the Lane Cove Valley Expressway was a planned but later cancelled freeway route in Sydney, New South Wales, Australia, intended to link the Sydney central business district to its north-western suburbs, and ultimately the Sydney–Newcastle Freeway to Newcastle. The entirety of the Sydney to Newcastle route was to be known as the F3 Freeway, a name that remains as a common name of the Sydney–Newcastle Freeway.

The North Western Expressway refers to the section between the Western Distributor and Victoria Road at Huntleys Point, while the Lane Cove Valley Expressway refers to the section between Huntleys Point and Wahroonga, passing through Lane Cove Valley.

== History ==
The route was planned as early as 1962 (even providing a proposed freeway "dotted line" in the UBD street directories of the 1970s). The original route was to start at the Western Distributor, connecting to Gladesville Bridge via a new elevated freeway. The route would continue approximately to the intersection of Delhi Road and Epping Road.

As of 1963, the section of the North Western Expressway "including Gladesville Bridge, Huntleys Point interchange, Tarban Creek Bridge, Hunters Hill interchange and Fig Tree Bridge" was "in progress".

The section from Fig Tree Bridge at Hunters Hill to Gladesville Bridge and the Western Distributor were the only completed sections, with the former section completed in 1965 with the opening of Tarban Creek Bridge. Work on stage one, from Ultimo to Pyrmont Bridge Road, began in 1974. Twelve people were arrested during protests in Ultimo against the expressway, a green ban was imposed by the Builders Labourers Federation, and the Whitlam government threatened to cut off $42 billion in road funding if the NSW government continued with construction. As a result, construction was suspended.

The Wran government cancelled the project in 1977, as a part of a change in government policy regarding freeways.

=== Subsequent proposals ===
After cancellation, the section between Fig Tree Bridge and Lane Cove Road became part of the proposed Castlereagh Freeway. The section between Delhi Road and Epping Road was shown on a 1984 Department of Main Roads map, but was removed by 1988 when that map was reprinted. The Castlereagh Freeway evolved to become the North West Transport Link, now the M2 Hills Motorway, which was completed in 1997 and follows the originally planned route from Epping Road to Seven Hills. The section between Fig Tree Bridge and Epping Road was abandoned.

The corridor of land to link the F3 and the M2 via the Lane Cove Valley was reserved for road use since 1988. It was abandoned by the state government in 1996, but was retained as open space. An alternative F3 to M2 link has been built as the NorthConnex and opened in 2020, under a different alignment.
