= Muriel Porter =

Australian journalist (born 1948)

Muriel Porter OAM
- Born: Muriel Lylie Carter; 5 May 1948 (age 78); Sydney, New South Wales
- Education: University of New England; Australian National University; Australian Catholic University; University of Melbourne
- Occupations: Journalist, author
- Known for: Critique of the Anglican Church of Australia

Muriel Lylie Porter OAM (née Carter, born 15 May 1948) is an Australian journalist based in Melbourne, Victoria. She is a frequent contributor to The Age newspaper and The Melbourne Anglican diocesan newspaper, for which she mostly writes about issues concerning the Anglican Church of Australia in which she is a prominent layperson. Porter is a representative of the Anglican Diocese of Melbourne on the General Synod of the Anglican Church of Australia.

She is critical of megachurches and is an advocate of the ordination of women, homosexual unions and allowing non-celibate homosexual people to become clergy. She was involved in the formation of an Anglican submission recommending abortion be legalised in Victoria. She is also the author of several books, including The New Puritans: the rise of fundamentalism in the Anglican Church, a book which is a critique of evangelicals in the Anglican Church.

== Background and career ==
Muriel Porter was born in Sydney, New South Wales, to Richard John Carter and Thelma Edith Richards. She was educated at Riverside Girls High School in Gladesville, the University of New England, the Australian National University, the Australian Catholic University and the University of Melbourne. Her PhD thesis was titled The defence of the marriage of priests in the English Reformation (1998).

Porter began a career in journalism as a cadet at the Sydney Morning Herald and then worked for a number of different newspapers including the Cambridge Evening News.

Porter was a member of staff at RMIT University in the journalism program and holds an honorary position at the University of Melbourne, lecturing on historical and philosophical studies.

In 2002, Porter was awarded the Medal of the Order of Australia for service to the community as an advocate for women's and social justice issues, and to the Anglican Church of Australia. She was inducted onto the Victorian Honour Roll of Women in 2009.

== Theological views ==
Porter's theological view points are liberal. Liturgically she is in the Anglo-Catholic tradition. She has been very active in campaigning for women's ordination in the Diocese of Melbourne and in the Anglican Church in Australia where she serves on the church's general synod.

== Published works ==
- Beyond the twelve: women disciples in the Gospels (1989)
- Women in the church: the great ordination debate in Australia (1989)
- Land of the spirit?: the Australian religious experience (1990)
- Sex, marriage and the church : patterns of change (1996)
- Sex, power & the clergy (2003)
- The new puritans: the rise of fundamentalism in the Anglican Church (2006)
- Women in purple : women bishops in Australia (2008)
- Sydney Anglicans and the Threat to World Anglicanism: The Sydney Experiment (2011)
- New exile? The future of Anglicanism (2015)
- A man called Johnny Mac: Selected writings of Bishop John McIntyre (2015)

== See also ==
- Liberal Anglo-Catholicism
- Ordination of women in the Anglican Communion
