= Tarban Creek =

Tarban
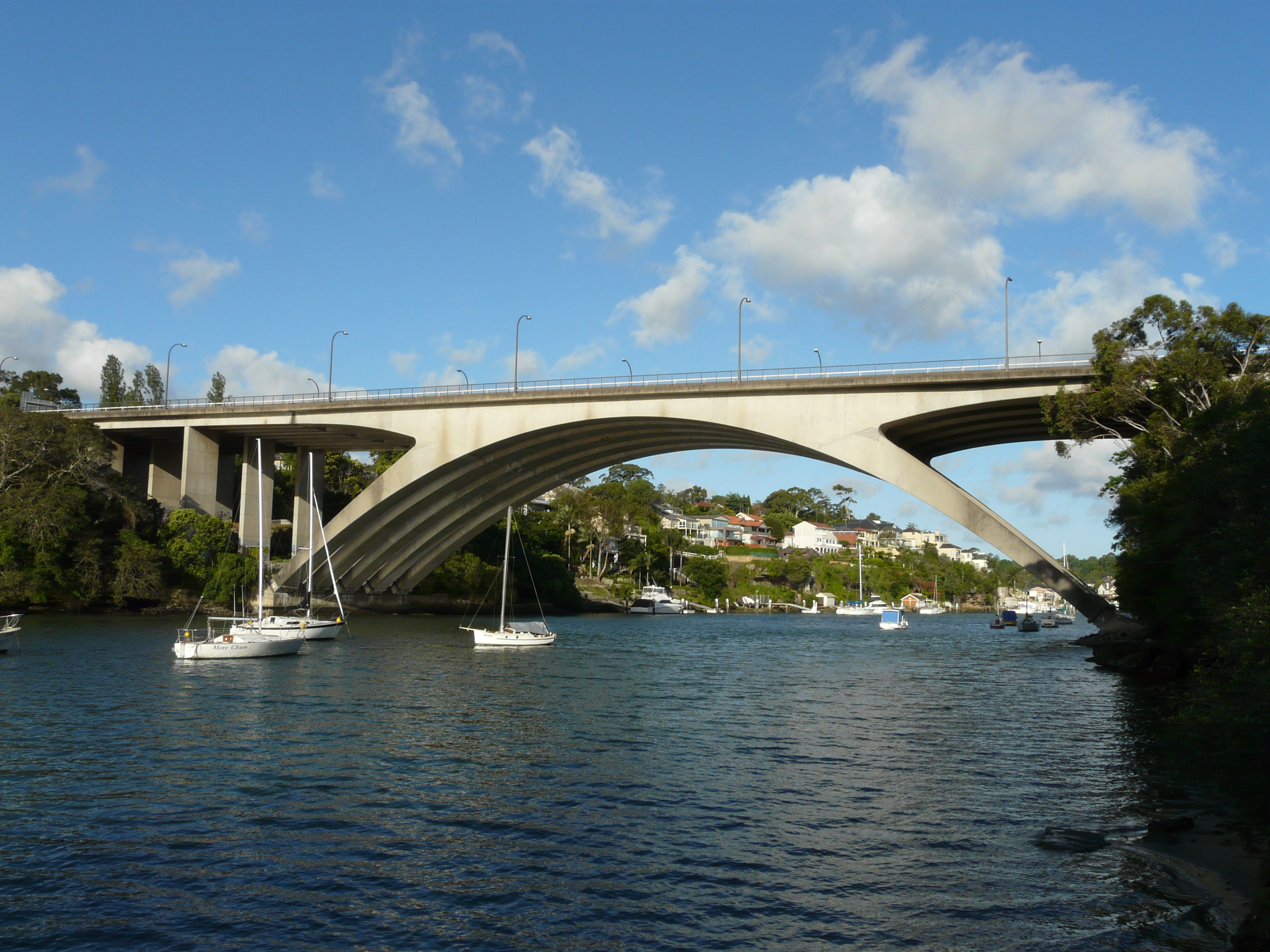
- Tarban Creek at Huntleys Cove, looking east towards Tarban Creek Bridge

Location
- Country: Australia
- State: New South Wales
- Municipality: Sydney

Physical characteristics
- Source
  - location: Gladesville
- Mouth: Parramatta River
  - location: Huntleys Point
  - coordinates: 33°50′19″S 151°8′59″E

Basin features
- River system: Parramatta River

Tarban Creek, a northern tributary of the Parramatta River, is a creek west of Sydney Harbour, in Sydney, New South Wales, Australia.

== Ecology ==
Tarban Creek starts near Earnshaw street in Gladesville and runs along a concrete base through Tarban Creek Reserve. The creek becomes substantially wider as it runs past Riverglade Reserve and a residential estate at Huntleys Cove. It then runs under the Tarban Creek Bridge and flows on to the Parramatta River at Huntleys Point.

A small footbridge also spans the creek, linking Riverglade Reserve to Joly Parade in Hunters Hill.

== History ==
A well-known Gladesville identity of the 1920s was simply known as Black Lucy. She was Lucy Willerri, an Aboriginal woman, originally from Alligator River in Queensland, and she was aged somewhere between 70 and 100. Along with her dogs, she made her home in a humpy of scrap iron and wood in the lantana and blackberry bushes on the banks of Tarban Creek. When her hut burnt down in 1923, the citizens of Gladesville were so concerned they organised and built a new cottage for her in Auburn Street. More than 200 people attended the ceremonial handing over of keys by the Mayor of Hunters Hill. When Lucy died in 1928, she was buried in the Presbyterian section of Field of Mars Cemetery, and the costs were met by the residents of Gladesville.

== See also ==
- Tarban Creek Bridge
- Parramatta River
