= Fig Tree Bridge =

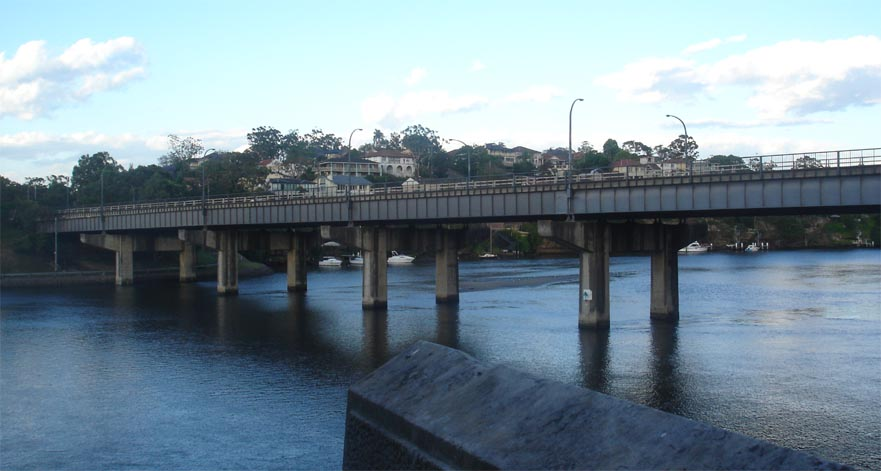
- South-west view from the southern abutment of the old bridge in Hunters Hill in 2006
- Coordinates: 33°49′47″S 151°08′46″E
- Carries: Burns Bay Road
- Crosses: Lane Cove River
- Locale: Hunters Hill, New South Wales, Australia
- Owner: Transport for NSW
- Preceded by: Epping Road / M2 Hills Motorway bridge

Characteristics
- Design: Girder bridge
- Material: Concrete
- Total length: 229 metres
- No. of spans: 7
- Clearance above: 9.1 metres (30 ft) at mean high water

History
- Opened: 28 September 1963
- Replaces: Fig Tree Bridge (Iron truss swing bridge (1885–1963))

Statistics
- Daily traffic: 19,000 (2012)

Location
- Interactive map of Fig Tree Bridge

The Fig Tree Bridge is a road bridge which carries Burns Bay Road across the Lane Cove River, and connects the suburbs of Hunters Hill in the south and Linley Point in the north, located approximately seven kilometres (four miles) northwest of the Sydney central business district in New South Wales, Australia. The concrete girder bridge carries motor vehicles, and a grade-separated footpath and cycleway.

== History ==
The bridge replaced the original Fig Tree Bridge, an iron truss swing bridge the site of which is located directly adjacent to the current bridge. The original bridge was opened in 1885, and formed part of the first project to provide a fixed crossing of Sydney Harbour. The project also included the first Gladesville Bridge (1881) and Iron Cove Bridge (1882). The earlier Fig Tree Bridge was located about 50 metres (160 ft) to the west of the new bridge. Its southern abutment, which still exists, has a viewing platform accessible from the end of Joubert Street, Hunters Hill. The wheel that once operated the opening span stands in memorial.

The bridge took an hour to open its iron structure. Four workers were required to get the gearwheel opening system going.

== Description ==
The current Fig Tree Bridge, which opened on 28 September 1963, was built in conjunction with the Tarban Creek and Gladesville bridges as part of the planned North Western Expressway linking the city with the future Sydney-Newcastle Freeway. The expressway was cancelled but the freeway grade road from the eastern end of the Gladesville Bridge, over Tarban Creek and ending at the northern end of Fig Tree Bridge has been maintained. The piers and deck were designed to allow an additional two lanes to be provided, and this can be seen in the eccentric camber of the deck, with the apex of the camber off-centre to the centreline of the deck.

Although the North Western Expressway has not eventuated, along with the Tarban Creek and Gladesville Bridges, Fig Tree Bridge serves a vital role as part of the next crossing upriver from the Sydney Harbour Bridge of Sydney Harbour, and is therefore an alternative route northwest between the central business district and the lower north shore via Burns Bay Road.

The Fig Tree Bridge is part of the Seven Bridges Walk, a fundraising event run by the Cancer Council of NSW. The event consists of a walking circuit that crossed seven of Sydney's bridges, including the Sydney Harbour, Pyrmont, Anzac, Iron Cove, Gladesville, and Tarban Creek bridges.

== Gallery ==
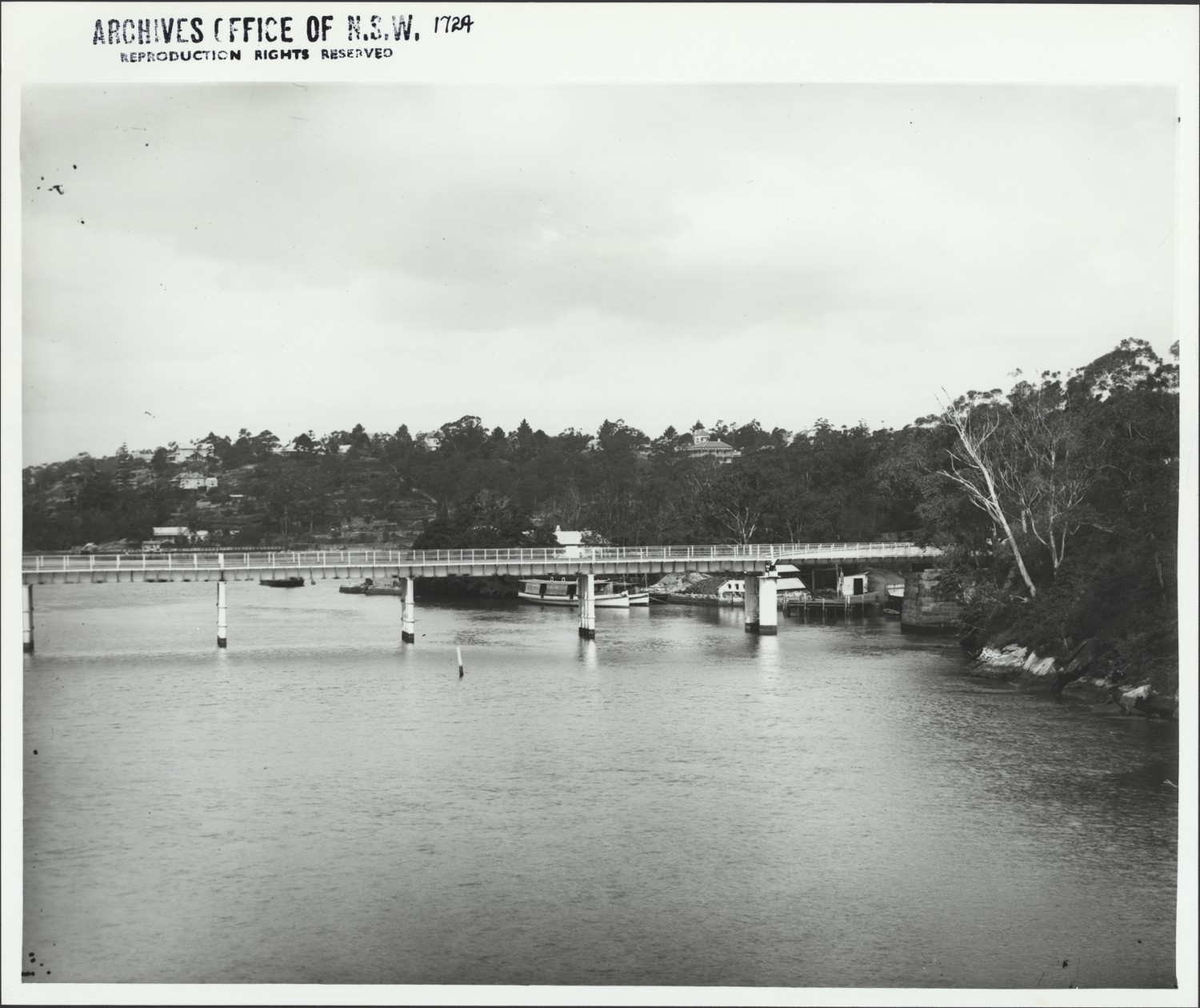
The first Fig Tree Bridge

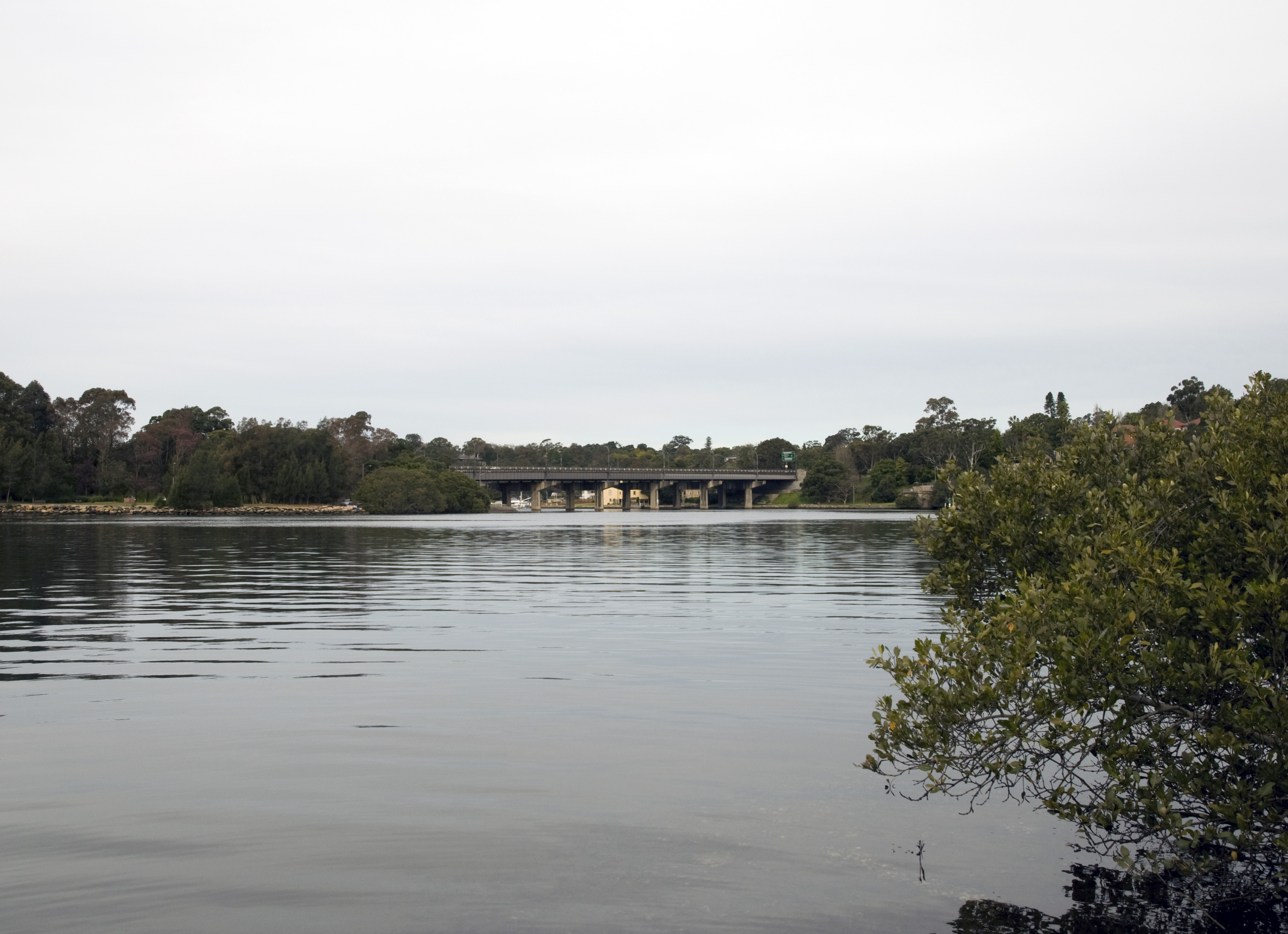
The bridge viewed from Boronia Park
