= Riverside Girls High School =

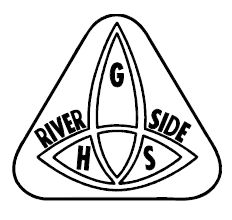

Location
- Huntleys Point Road; Huntleys Point, New South Wales; Australia
- Coordinates: 33°50′24″S 151°8′29″E

Information
- Type: Public, secondary, single-sex, day school
- Motto: Latin: Facta Non Verba (Deeds Not Words)
- Established: 1934
- Educational authority: New South Wales Education Standards Authority
- Oversight: New South Wales Department of Education
- Principal: Louise McNeil
- Staff: 59
- Years: 7–12
- Enrolment: 650 (2023)
- Campus: Suburban
- Colours: Navy blue, pale blue & white
- Website: riversideg-h.schools.nsw.gov.au

Riverside Girls High School is a secondary, public, day school for girls, located in Huntleys Point, New South Wales, a suburb of Sydney, Australia. It was founded in 1934, celebrating its 80th anniversary in 2014.

Riverside is divided into two groupings. The Junior section consists of the 7th to the 10th grades. The Senior section consists of 11th and 12th grade classes. The school's motto is "Facta Non Verba" meaning 'Deeds Not Words'.

== Extra-curricular activities ==
Other extracurricular activities include:

- Students Representative Council
- Drama Soiree
- Sports
- Concert Band – the concert band is entered into competitions every year, such as Macdonalds festival
- Stage (jazz) Band
- Choir
- Peer Mediation dispute settlement Program, and the NSW Law Society Peer Mediation SCRAM Competition
- Peer Support Program with Year 7 and 10
- Mock Trial
- Amnesty International group
- Public Speaking Club
- Dance Company and Ensemble
- Lite (Religious meet)
- SIFE (Students in Free Enterprise) Business Competition
- Drama Club and Environment Club

== Notable alumni ==
- Connie Mitchell, singer, member of Sneaky Sound System
- Casey Burgess, singer, member of children's performance group Hi-5
- Karen Moras, swimmer
- Muriel Porter OAM, journalist and author; Anglican laywoman
- Leeanna Walsman, actress

== See also ==
- List of Government schools in New South Wales
