= Gladesville Bridge =

Bridge in Sydney, New South Wales, Australia

Gladesville Bridge (current bridge)
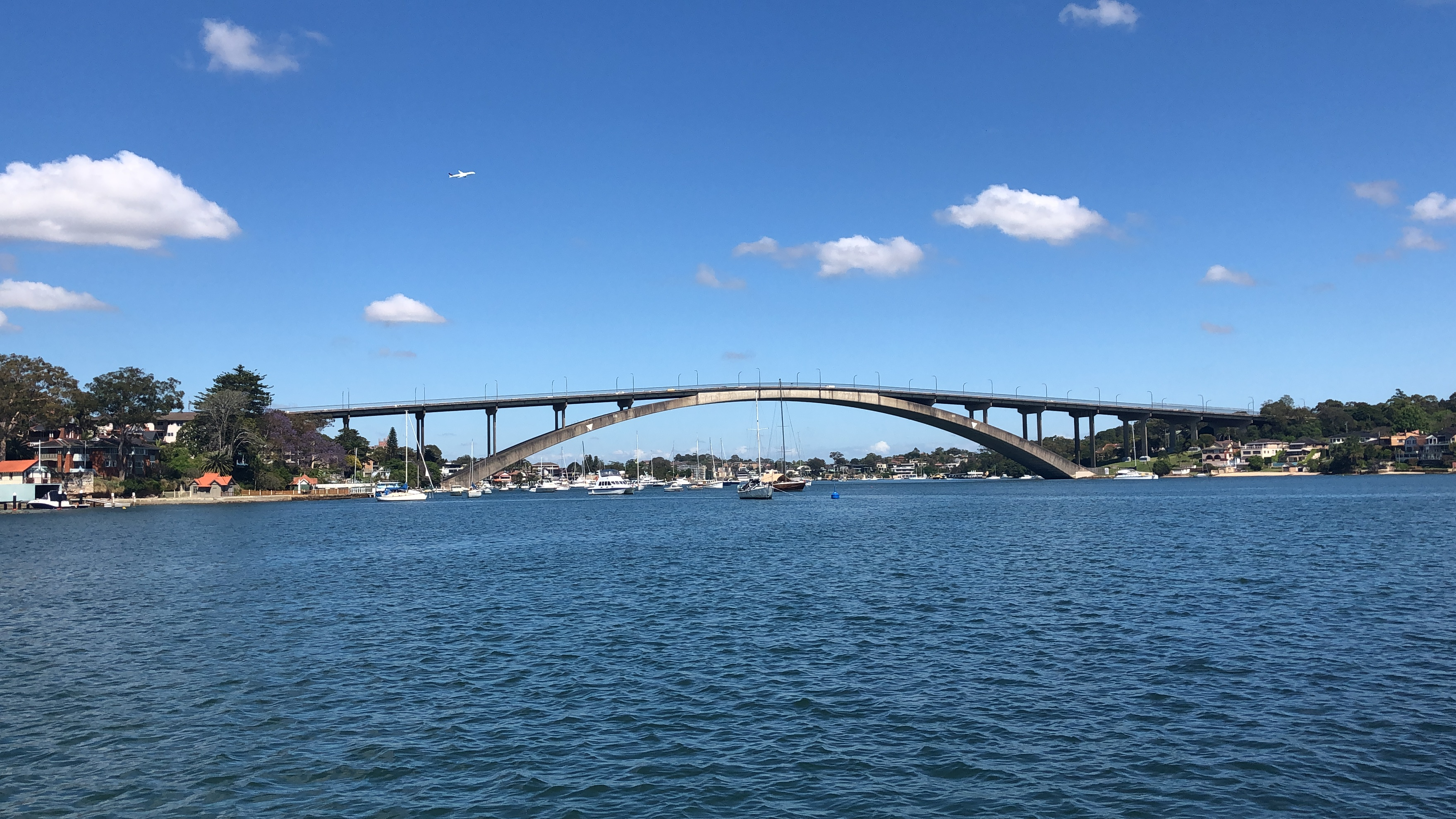
- Gladesville Bridge, pictured in 2024
- Coordinates: 33°50′31″S 151°08′52″E
- Carries: Victoria Road: Motor vehicles; Grade separated pedestrian footpath; Grade separated bicycle path
- Crosses: Parramatta River
- Locale: Drummoyne and Huntleys Point, Sydney, New South Wales, Australia (Map)
- Owner: Transport for NSW

Characteristics
- Design: Concrete arch road bridge
- Total length: 579.4 metres (1,901 ft)
- Height: 45 metres (148 ft)
- Longest span: 305 metres (1,001 ft)

History
- Architect: Anthony Gee; G. Maunsell & Partners; Eugène Freyssinet
- Built: 1959–1964
- Construction cost: A£3,417,265
- Opened: 2 October 1964; 62 years ago by Princess Marina, Duchess of Kent

New South Wales Heritage Register
- Official name: Gladesville Bridge
- Type: State heritage (built)
- Designated: 1 October 2014; 12 years ago
- Reference no.: 1935
- Type: Road Bridge
- Category: Transport – Land
- Builders: Reed & Mallik (Engineers, England); Stuart Bros (Builders, Sydney)

Location
- Interactive map of Gladesville Bridge (current bridge)

Gladesville Bridge is a heritage-listed concrete arch road bridge that carries Victoria Road over the Parramatta River, linking the Sydney suburbs of Drummoyne and Huntleys Point, in the local government areas of Canada Bay and Hunter's Hill respectively, in New South Wales, Australia. Despite its name, the bridge is not in Gladesville.

The Gladesville Bridge is a few kilometres upstream of the famous Sydney Harbour Bridge. When it was completed in 1964, Gladesville Bridge was the longest single span concrete arch ever constructed. Gladesville Bridge is the largest of a complex of three bridges, including Fig Tree Bridge and Tarban Creek Bridge, designed to carry traffic as part of the North Western Expressway. The bridge was the first phase of this freeway project that was to connect traffic from the Newcastle via Wahroonga/Lane Cove, then through Glebe/Annandale to connect into the city. Due to community action the freeway project was abandoned by the Wran Government in 1977, leaving the Gladesville Bridge connecting the existing arterial roads.

The Gladesville Bridge was designed by Anthony Gee, G. Maunsell & Partners and Eugène Freyssinet and built from 1959 to 1964 by Reed & Mallik (Engineers, England) and Stuart Bros (Builders, Sydney). The property is owned by Transport for NSW. The bridge was added to the New South Wales State Heritage Register on 1 October 2014.

== History ==
Europeans first settled in the Gladesville/Drummoyne area of Sydney soon after landfall at Sydney Cove. In the 1790s, Crown grants of 12-hectare (30-acre) lots were made available in the vicinity of Gladesville to encourage agricultural pursuits in the area. The future suburb of Gladesville remained isolated and rural until the 1850s when the earlier land grants were subdivided into large urban building blocks for the development of 'gentlemen's residences' for the wealthier colonists of NSW.

=== 1881 bridge ===
Gladesville Bridge (1881 bridge)
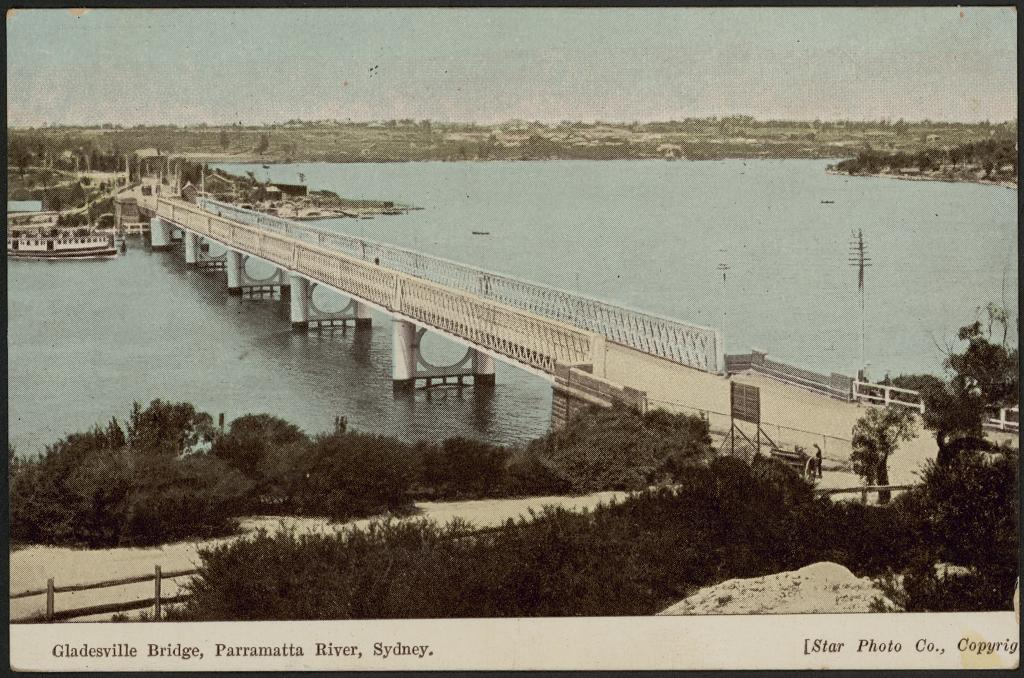
- Coordinates: 33°50′37″S 151°08′41″E
- Carries: Victoria Road; (Road, pedestrian and, later, tram)
- Crosses: Parramatta River
- Locale: Drummoyne and Huntleys Point, Sydney, New South Wales, Australia
- Other name: Parramatta Bridge

Characteristics
- Design: Truss girder bridge with swing span
- Total length: 274.32 metres (900 ft)
- Width: 7.62 metres (25 ft) (road)
- Longest span: 45.72 metres (150 ft)
- No. of spans: 6
- Clearance below: 6.1 metres (20 ft)

History
- Opened: 11 February 1881
- Closed: 1964
- Replaced by: Gladesville Bridge

Location
- Interactive map of Gladesville Bridge (1881 bridge)

To provide better access to Sydney, a wharf was soon erected on the Parramatta River at Gladesville and a two-lane steel lattice truss girder bridge with swing span was built across the river between Drummoyne and Huntleys Point. Remnants of the sandstone abutments of the original bridge still exist on the river banks to the south-west of the present bridge. This bridge carried a tramline and road traffic but did not accommodate pedestrians. This bridge, called the Gladesville Bridge, and also known as the Parramatta River Bridge, was opened on 1 February 1881.

The old Gladesville Bridge was constructed as part of a series of bridges built during the 1880s, which also saw the construction of the Fig Tree Bridge and the Iron Cove Bridge. It was the only crossing of the Parramatta River east of Parramatta at the time of construction, with punts and ferries (steamers) providing the main methods of crossing the river. The closest crossing to the bridge was the Bedlam Punt, which operated from 1829 through to 1881 between Punt Road in the present-day Gladesville and the Great North Road in present-day Abbotsford. This bridge was also constructed per agitation by the community on providing a tram service from Ryde to the city.

The 1881 Gladesville Bridge was about 300 metres (984 ft) to the west of the modern bridge. This original bridge only carried one lane of traffic in each direction as well as a tramway. It featured a swing span on the southern end of the bridge that could be opened to permit sailing ships and steamers with high funnels to pass. 'Sixty miler' colliers from Newcastle would require the bridge to be opened to gain access to the Australian Gas Light Company (AGL) gasworks site at Mortlake, (now redeveloped as Breakfast Point). The bridge stood on iron cylinders with a sandstone pier at each end of the bridge. The sandstone piers are all that remain today of the original bridge, with the northern pier adjacent to the Huntleys Point ferry wharf, and the southern in Howley Park in Drummoyne.

=== Current bridge ===
By the 1950s, due to a rapid growth in private car ownership and road freight transport in Sydney during the interwar and post World War 2 period, the traffic crossing the old Gladesville Bridge was becoming increasingly congested. With consistent interruptions and delays from the tramline and from shipping transportation along the Parramatta River, it was soon realised that a new bridge was required to alleviate the problem.

In the late 1950s, the Department of Main Roads (DMR) intended the replacement Gladesville Bridge to be a conventional steel truss of its own design. However, an alternative approach, prepared by English civil engineering firm G. Maunsell & Partners, was soon submitted by another English firm, Reed & Mallik Ltd which had teamed up with Sydney-based builders Stuart Brothers.

Civil engineer Guy Maunsell, having recently split from his professional business partners and seeking new international engineering opportunities, recognised that a concrete arch bridge would be a much better suited and economical solution for the new Gladesville Bridge than the steel truss the DMR had designed. However, winning the bridge contract was perhaps considered a long shot by the firm's partners and scarce resources were invested into the project from the outset. The firm's first graduate recruit, 22-year-old Anthony Gee, was given the task of developing Maunsell's preliminary drawings into a viable design from which Reed & Mallik Ltd and Stuart Brothers, could formulate a price. Due in part to the unprecedented nature of the design, the proposal was independently reviewed by internationally revered engineer, and pioneer of pre-stressed concrete methods, Eugene Freyssinet. Among the last works of Freyssinet's life, the proposed 277-metre (910 ft), six-lane, high level concrete arch bridge was soon extended to 305 metres (1,000 ft), the design accepted and the contract to build was issued.

DMR intended the new $6.3 million Gladesville Bridge to be part of the North Western Expressway, a larger program of road works that would act as a main artery to link Sydney with the northern suburbs, and through to Newcastle. Although the strategic project was finally abandoned in the 1970s, the new Gladesville Bridge started in December 1959, and took nearly five years to complete. It was officially opened by Princess Marina on 2 October 1964. The bridge was originally opened with six traffic lanes, but the extra-wide outer lanes enabled a later reconfiguration to take place. The bridge now has three northbound lanes and four southbound lanes, separated by a concrete median.

==== Design and construction ====
At the time when the bridge was planned, it was anticipated that extremely large vessels would need to pass underneath it in the years to come. This, as well as the topography of the site, explains why the bridge was designed with a high 61 metre (200 ft) clearance.

The construction of the new Gladesville Bridge was a noteworthy engineering achievement for its time and, being both daring and untried, its innovative design and construction set several new standards on the international stage. In many ways the construction echoed the Roman method of building arches using segmented units built over a temporary formwork. In Gladesville's case, these were hollow precast concrete blocks which were hoisted up from barges on the river, then moved down a railway on the top of the formwork into position. Every few blocks, special inflatable rubber gaskets were inserted. When all of the blocks in the arch (there are four parallel arches altogether, not seen in the picture) were in place, the gaskets were 'inflated' using synthetic hydraulic fluid, expanding the entire arch and lifting it away from the formwork to support its own weight. Once adjusted to the correct position, the gaskets were filled with liquid concrete, driving out the oil and setting to form a permanent solid arch. The formwork was then moved sideways and the next arch constructed in the same fashion. Once all four arches were erected, the deck was laid on top built from further precast concrete units. The arches bed into solid sandstone bedrock on either side of the river.

The bridge as originally tendered for this location was a rather conventional steel cantilever bridge, but one of the contractors tendered the alternative catenary arch design, recognising it was pushing the envelope of existing bridge-building knowledge. The contractor's designer was G Maunsell & Partners of London. Their alternative was accepted after submission to the famous bridge engineer Eugène Freyssinet, who approved the design with recommendations. The inflatable gasket method for example had been pioneered by Freyssinet on much earlier designs.

Gladesville Bridge was the first 305-metre (1,000 ft) span concrete bridge in the world and had a substantial number of engineering and technical elements that made it a world-leading bridge design and construction achievement. It was also the first bridge, if not one of the first bridges, to utilise computer programming in its construction. As there was no suitable proprietary engineering software available at that time, the bridge designer (Anthony Gee of G. Maunsell & Partners) also wrote a suite of five computer programs for analysis and detailed design to guide its construction.

Having eclipsed Sweden's Sando Bridge (built in 1943 at 264 metres (866 ft)) to become the longest concrete arch span bridge in the world, the new Gladesville Bridge was an unprecedented success that attracted world-wide attention and interest. Measuring 305 metres (1,000 ft) in length, 61 metres (200 ft) above the water level, and 22 metres (72 ft) wide, with 2-metre (6 ft) wide pathways on either side, the scale of the new Gladesville Bridge established it as one of the landmark engineering achievements of the world.

In the 1970s, the roadway of Gladesville Bridge was widened from six to seven-lanes (without structural modification) to accommodate increased traffic flow. This widening was achieved by narrowing the generous width of the pedestrian walkways on either side of the roadway. Aside from this, the bridge has remained relatively unchanged since its completion in 1964.

In the 1980s, the Roads & Traffic Authority added an additional vehicle traffic lane by narrowing the footpath on the western side. They later signposted the path on the eastern side as a shared path. In the late 1990s (Note: Possibly after the Action for Bikes: BikePlan 2010 or Sydney Olympics), the RTA engaged Hassell consultants to design a shared path flyover crossing the slip lane, and Environmental Planning Pty Ltd to investigate the environmental impact.

Gladesville Bridge was named an Engineering Heritage International Marker upon its 50th anniversary on 1 October 2014; and was named an International Historic Civil Engineering Landmark on 15 December 2015.

== Description ==
The Gladesville Bridge connects the suburbs of Gladesville (located on the northern bank of the Parramatta River) and Drummoyne (located on its southern and eastern sides). Gladesville Bridge is a four-box pre-stressed concrete arch with a span of 305 metres (1,000 ft). Its total length (including approaches) is 579.4 metres (1,901 ft). The roadway across the bridge is includes seven roadway lanes with pathway on either side.

The arch of the bridge is supported by concrete thrust blocks embedded into sandstone foundations on either side of Parramatta River. The bridge was constructed as four arches, each made from precast concrete box sections. Each rib of blocks was erected on a falsework system supported on piles. When the four arches were in place, they were stressed together (using the Freyssinet stressing system) by transverse cables passing through diaphragms.

On completion of the arch, the piers (stressed vertically using the Lee McCall system) were constructed on both the arch and approaches. These supported the deck which is a waffle construction of eight longitudinal pre-cast and pre-stressed "T" beams with four intermediate cast-in-place transverse beams per span, and with cast in place fillers between the "T" beams. At its northern end, the deck flares out from its six lanes to accommodate the diverging traffic lanes feeding both Victoria Road and Burns Bay Road.

Gladesville Bridge is the furthest east (downstream) of the crossings on Parramatta River. A short distance further east, Parramatta River enters Port Jackson, and the next crossing on Port Jackson is Sydney Harbour Bridge.

=== Condition ===
Still in active operation and serving heavy inner-city road traffic on a daily basis, the Gladesville Bridge appears to be in good physical condition due to regular maintenance works.

=== Modifications and dates ===
In the 1970s, the roadway of Gladesville Bridge was widened from six to seven-lanes (without structural modification) to accommodate an increased traffic flow over the bridge. This widening was achieved by taking in some of the generous width of the pedestrian walkways on either side of the roadway. Fencing along the north eastern side of the Gladesville Bridge appears to have been a later addition.

=== Bicycle and pedestrian access ===
The bridge has a footpath on both sides of the bridge. The path on the west side is under a metre wide, much too narrow to cycle on. The path on the east side is listed as a shared cycle path, but it is also only 1.7-metre (5 ft 7 in) wide bound between a low barrier with a steel hand rail on the road side and a two-metre (six-foot-seven-inch) fence on the drop side. These barriers make the effective path approximately 1-metre (3 ft 3 in) wide for two way cycle and pedestrian traffic.

Access from the northern end is via a pedestrian tunnel off Huntleys Point Road, directly under the bridge, with stairs. The bridge is not wheelchair accessible.

== Heritage listing ==
As at 19 December 2013, Gladesville Bridge has state heritage significance as the longest concrete arch span bridge in the world at the time of its completion in 1964, being 305 metres (1,000 ft). One of only two of its type in NSW, Gladesville Bridge is considered to be a leading example of technical and engineering achievement on the international stage. An innovative design that set new global standards for design and construction, Gladesville Bridge was one of the first bridges in the world (if not, the first) to utilise computer programming in its construction. With particular social significance and an important association with a number of internationally acclaimed engineers and engineering firms (including G. Maunsell & Partners and Eugene Freyssinet), Gladesville Bridge is one of the landmark engineering achievements of the world. Gladesville Bridge was listed on the New South Wales State Heritage Register on 1 October 2014 having satisfied the following criteria.

The place is important in demonstrating the course, or pattern, of cultural or natural history in New South Wales.

Gladesville Bridge has state heritage significance as the longest concrete arch span bridge in the world at the time of its completion in 1964 (at 1000 feet, this record was held for 15 years until 1980). Considered to be a leading example of technical and engineering achievement, the Gladesville Bridge was an innovative design that set new standards for design and construction on the international stage. One of the landmark engineering achievements of the world, Gladesville Bridge was one of the first bridges in the world (if not, the first) to utilise computer programming in its construction.

The place has a strong or special association with a person, or group of persons, of importance of cultural or natural history of New South Wales's history.

Gladesville Bridge has state heritage significance for its association with a number of internationally acclaimed engineers and engineering firms. Designed by English firm G. Maunsell & Partners, the vision of the new Gladesville Bridge being a concrete arch bridge, rather than a more standard steel truss bridge, is attributed to Guy Maunsell. Maunsell was a revered British engineer and early developer of pre-stressed concrete. In the mid-20th century, at the time of the construction of Gladesville Bridge, G. Maunsell & Partners were applying their creative methods to building iconic bridges across the world. Gladesville Bridge is also associated with the celebrated French engineer, Eugene Freyssinet who reviewed the innovative and unprecedented design. A pioneer in using pre-stressed concrete in bridge construction, Freyssinet's contribution to the design of Gladesville Bridge was among the last works of his life.

The place is important in demonstrating aesthetic characteristics and/or a high degree of creative or technical achievement in New South Wales.

Gladesville Bridge has state heritage significance for its aesthetic and technical significance. Upon its construction in 1964, Gladesville Bridge was the longest concrete arch span bridge in the world. Gladesville Bridge was considered to be one of the landmark engineering achievements of the world. Built in an era when aesthetic qualities were given high priority, particularly on high-profile infrastructure projects, Gladesville Bridge is a distinctive structure that serves as an inner-city landmark from the road and river.

The place has a strong or special association with a particular community or cultural group in New South Wales for social, cultural or spiritual reasons.

Gladesville Bridge has state heritage significance for its social value to the community of NSW. The replacement of the 1881 Gladesville Bridge, and the development of the unrealised North-Western Expressway, was a major Department of Main Roads project that was instigated by, and responded directly to, the demands of the Sydney community. The crossing of Parramatta River at this point was considered to be a critical connection between the city and the northern suburbs. A critical link in the planned expressway to Newcastle, the new Gladesville Bridge was to alleviate traffic congestion and provide better access for the new residential suburbs and communities that were developing in the post-war period. Today, Gladesville Bridge is a landmark structure that continues to be a major arterial roadway servicing the Sydney community.

The place has potential to yield information that will contribute to an understanding of the cultural or natural history of New South Wales.

Gladesville Bridge has state heritage significance for its technical significance and, as such, may have potential to reveal information about its world-class standards of design and construction that led to the structure being considered a leading example of technical and engineering achievement.

The place possesses uncommon, rare or endangered aspects of the cultural or natural history of New South Wales.

Gladesville Bridge has state heritage significance as a rare example of a concrete arch span bridge in NSW. Gladesville Bridge is one of only two of its type in the state-the other is the nearby Tarban Creek Bridge which is a 300-foot bridge, built in 1965 as part of the same unrealised North-Western Expressway project that was also responsible for the construction of Gladesville Bridge. Although both were built by the same team, both Gladesville Bridge and Tarban Creek Bridge are distinctly different in their structural specifications and construction methods. The longest concrete arch span bridge in the world upon its construction (a record held for 15 years), Gladesville Bridge is now the seventh longest bridge of its type (in excess of 1000 feet) in the world. Eclipsed by the1280 foot Krk Bridge in Croatia (built in 1980), Gladesville Bridge continues to be the longest concrete arch span bridge in Australia.

The place is important in demonstrating the principal characteristics of a class of cultural or natural places/environments in New South Wales.

Gladesville Bridge is a representative example of the technological advancement of bridge design and construction in NSW. From the peak of the arch, one can witness the evolution of bridge engineering in Sydney - from the Sydney Harbour Bridge (1932), to the Gladesville Bridge (1964) to the Anzac Bridge (1995). Replacing an earlier 1881 swing bridge and ferry service, Gladesville Bridge is also a representative example of a critical transport crossing across the Parramatta River.

== Engineering heritage awards ==
The bridge received an Engineering Heritage International Marker from Engineers Australia as part of its Engineering Heritage Recognition Program and was designated as an International Historic Civil Engineering Landmark by the American Society of Civil Engineers.

== Gallery ==
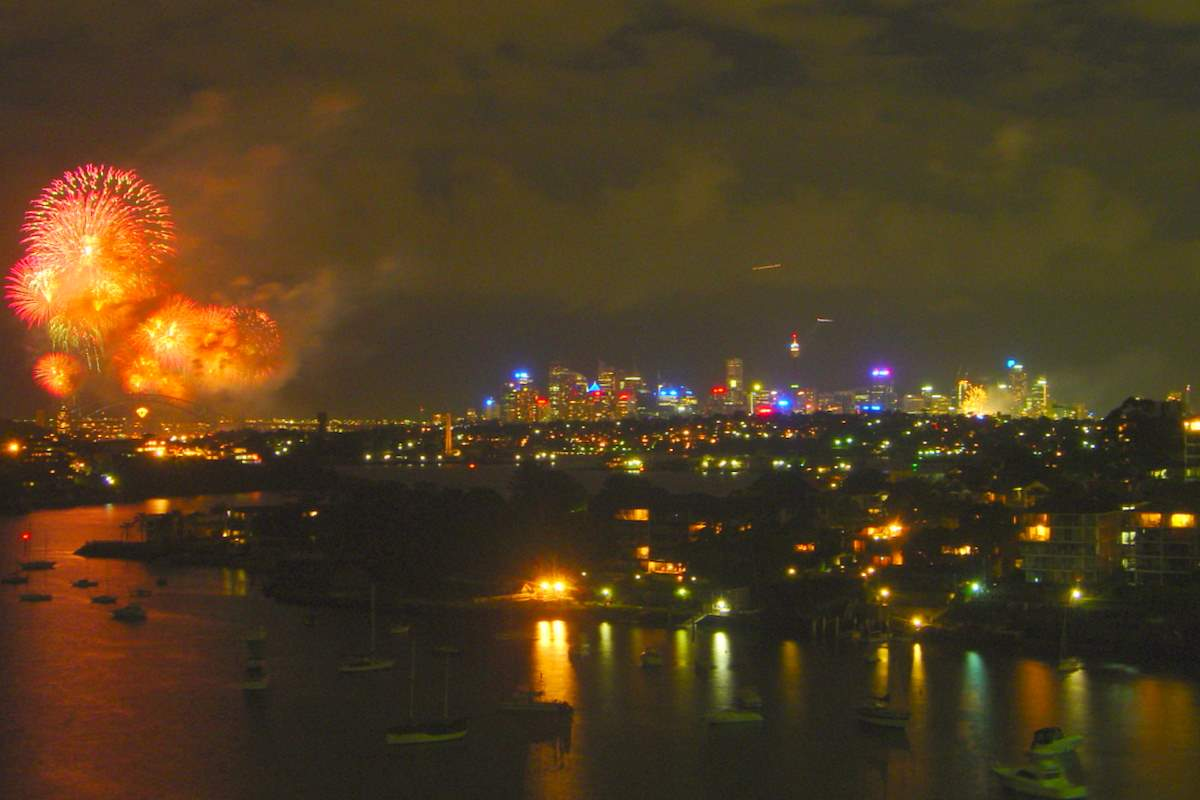
The view of Sydney from the current Gladesville Bridge

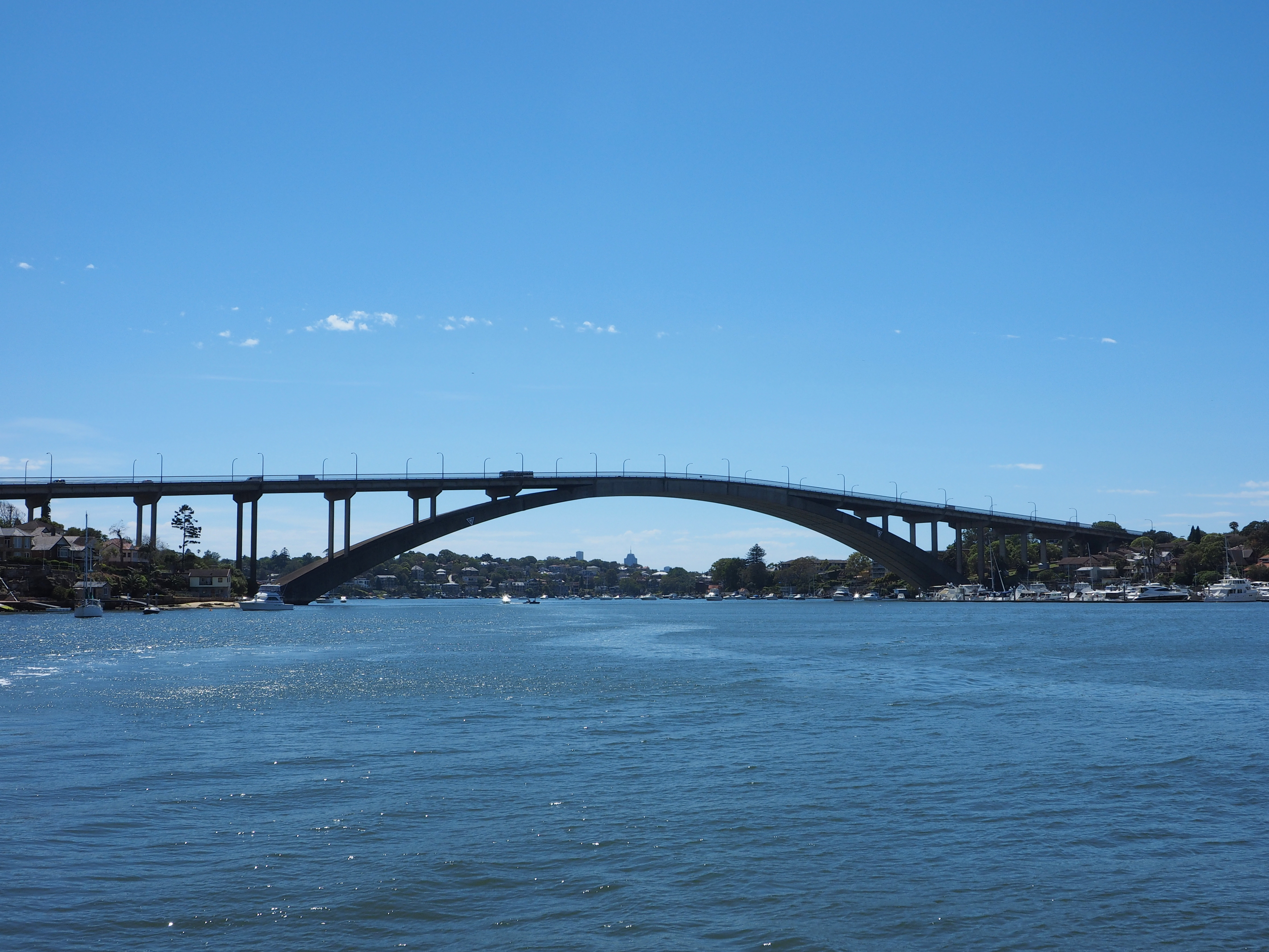
The western side of the Gladesville Bridge

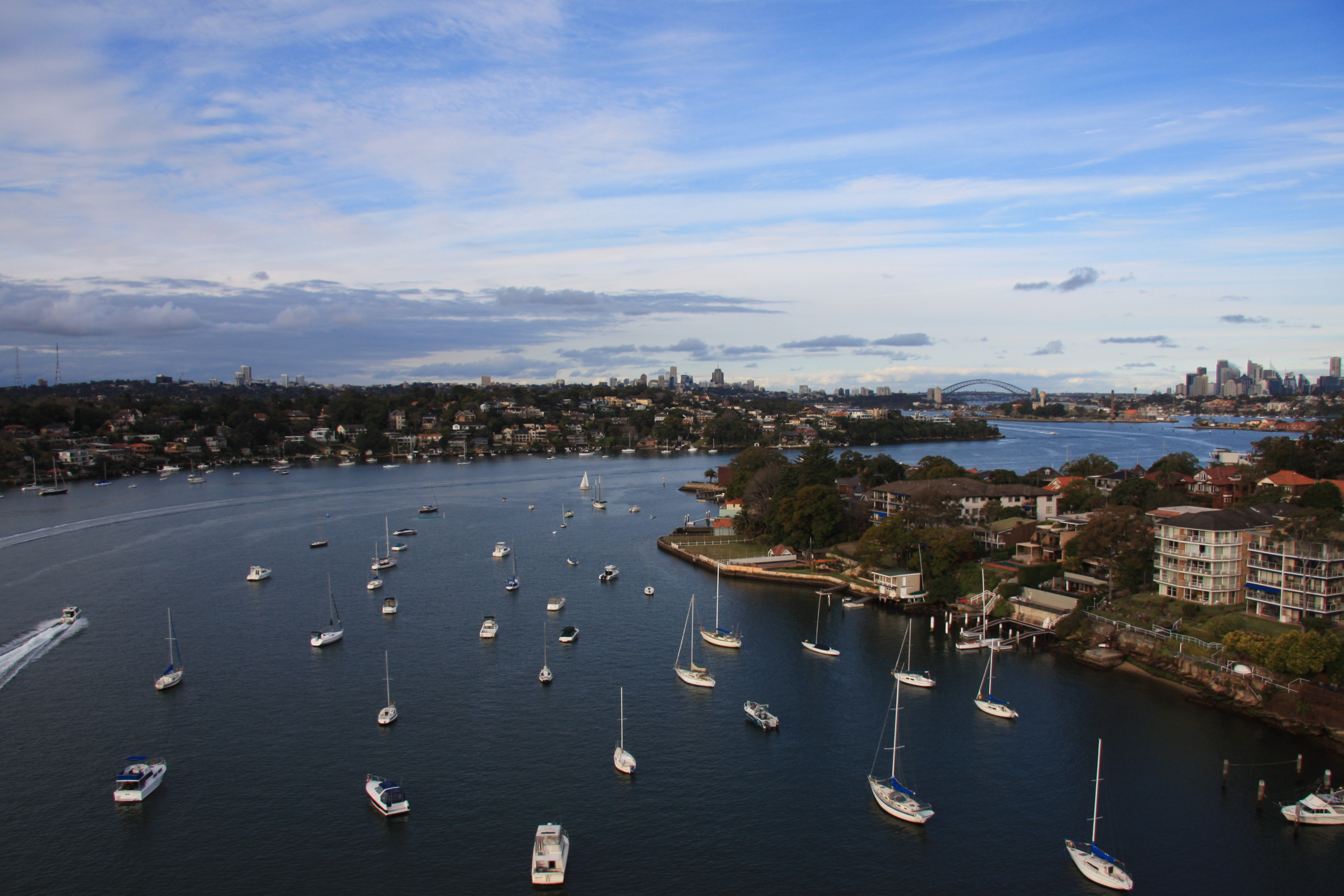
Daytime view of Parramatta River from Gladesville Bridge facing east

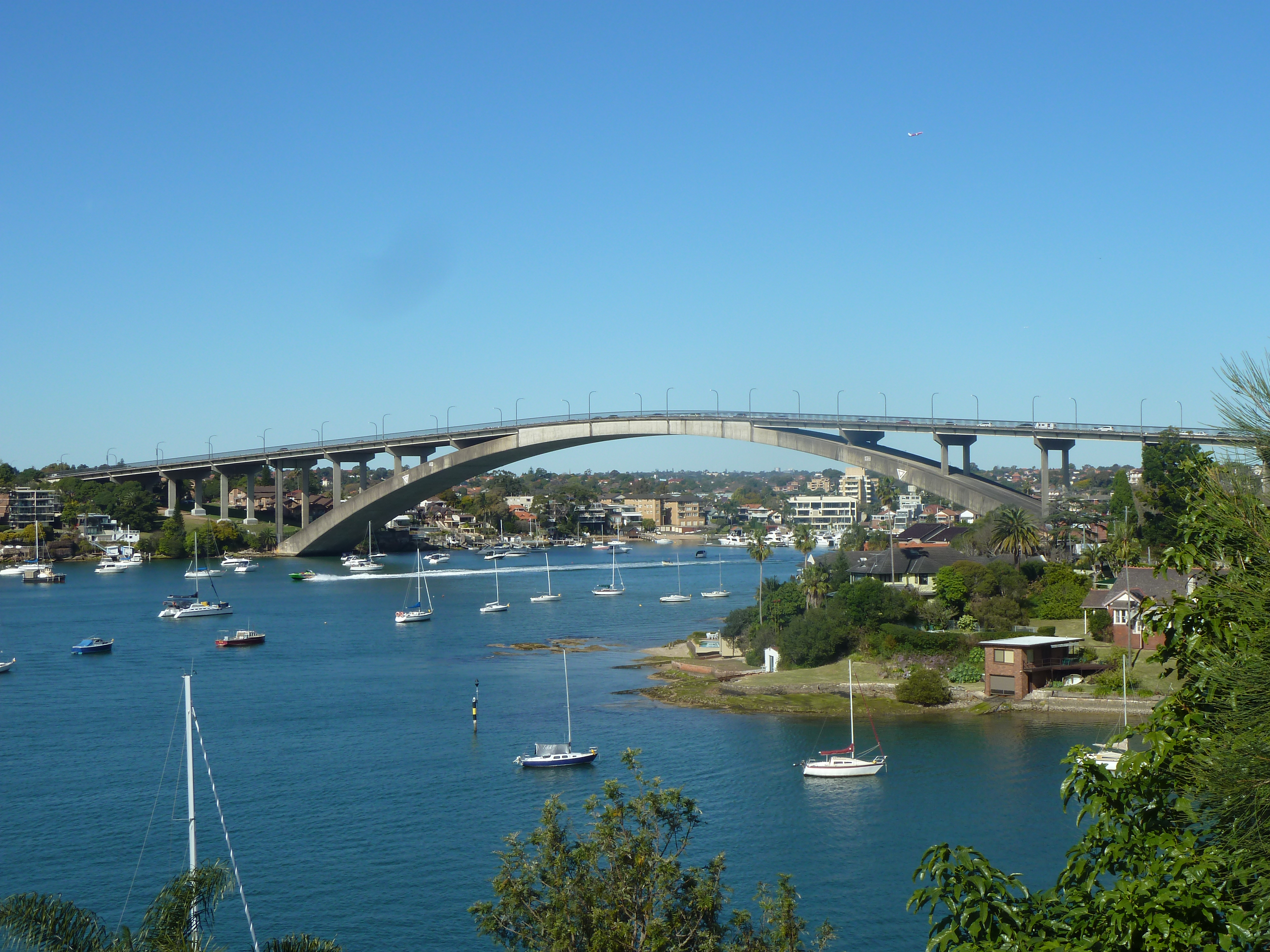
View of the Gladesville Bridge looking east

== See also ==
- List of bridges in Sydney
- List of the largest arch bridges
