= Tarban Creek Bridge =

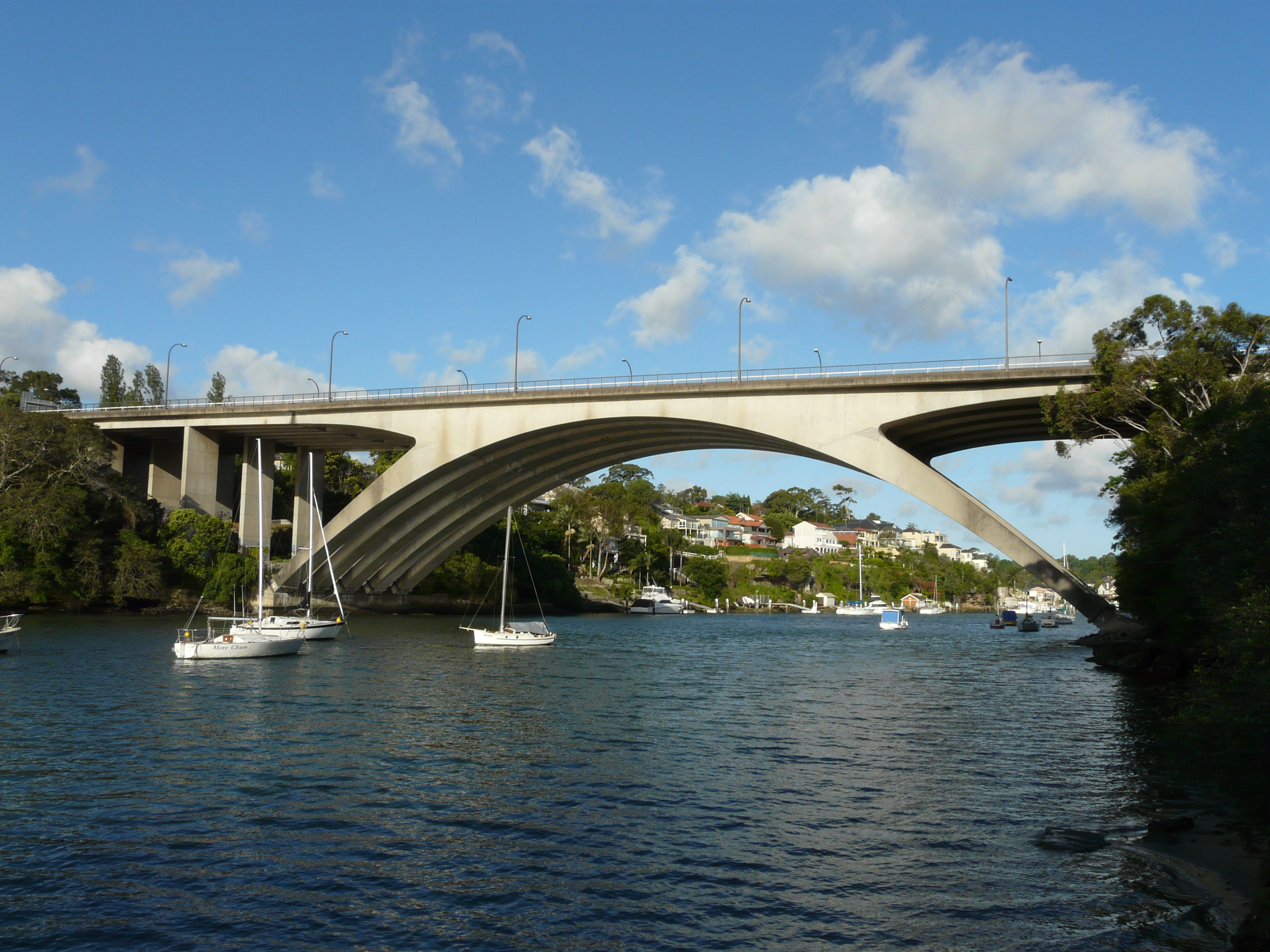
- Tarban Creek Bridge, pictured in 2007 from Huntleys Point, west of the bridge.
- Coordinates: 33°50′14″S 151°08′43″E
- Carries: Burns Bay Road: Motor vehicles; Pedestrians; Bicycles
- Crosses: Tarban Creek
- Locale: Hunters Hill, New South Wales, Australia
- Begins: Huntleys Point
- Ends: Hunters Hills
- Owner: Transport for NSW

Characteristics
- Design: Arch bridge
- Material: Prestressed concrete
- Height: 20.3 metres (67 ft)
- Longest span: 90 metres (300 ft)
- No. of lanes: 4

History
- Designer: Tony Gee of G Maunsell and Partners
- Opened: December 1965

Location
- Interactive map of Tarban Creek Bridge

The Tarban Creek Bridge is a prestressed concrete arch bridge that carries the Burns Bay Road across the Tarban Creek, located west of the Sydney central business district in New South Wales, Australia. The bridge is situated between the Gladesville Bridge and the Fig Tree Bridge, being immediately to the north of Gladesville Bridge. The bridge connects the suburbs of Hunters Hill and Huntleys Point. In addition to the four-lane carriage, the bridge carries a grade-separated shared pedestrian footpath and cycleway.

== Description ==
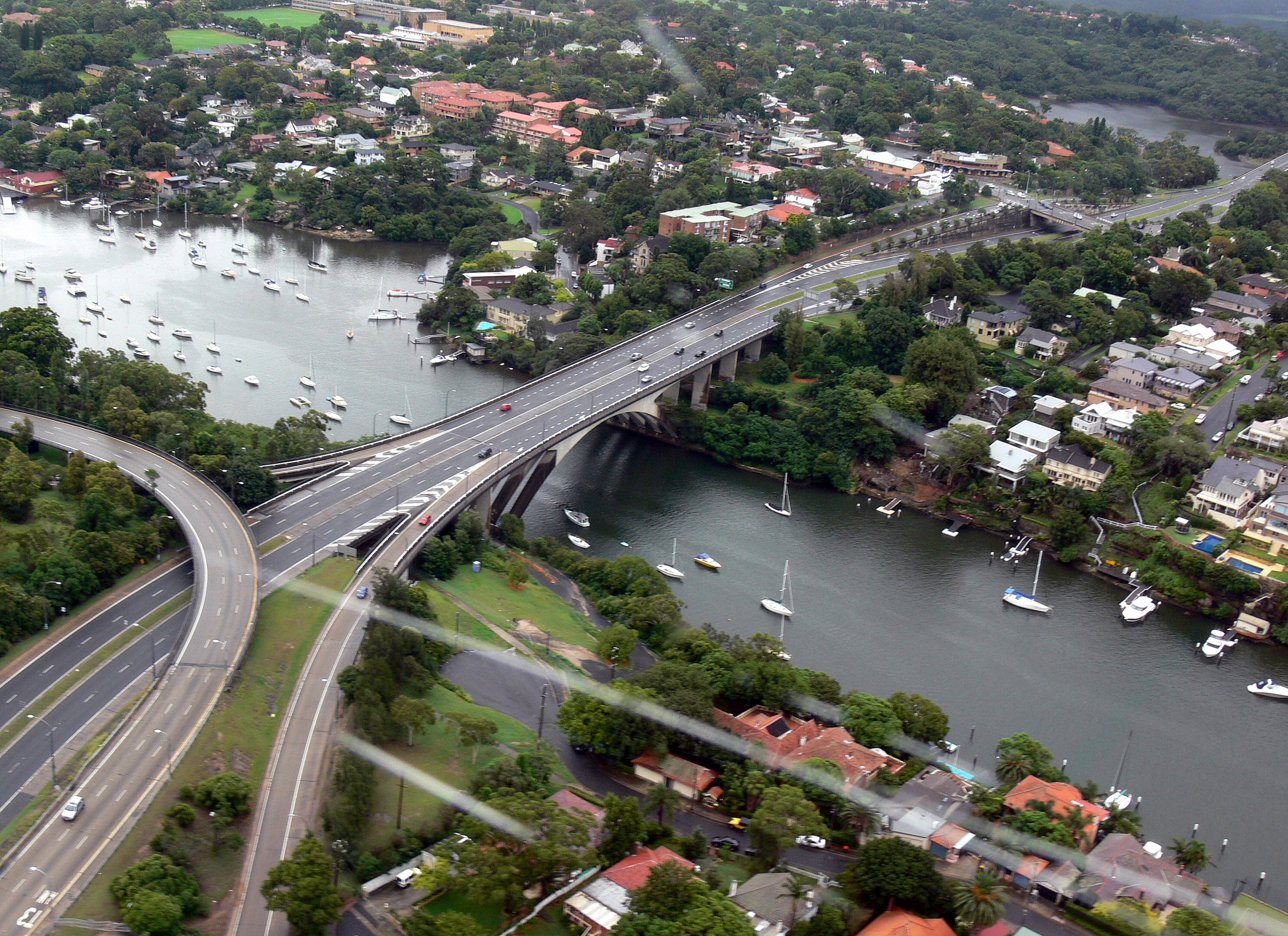
An aerial view of the Tarban Creek Bridge and associated roadway.

Opened in December 1965, the Tarban Creek Bridge formed a "missing link" between the existing Gladesville and Fig Tree Bridges. Traffic between the old Fig Tree and Gladesville Bridges previously had to negotiate the streets of Hunters Hill to cross the creek further upstream. The three new bridges were built to carry a North Western Expressway, which never came to fruition.

From 2006, the Tarban Creek Bridge formed part of the Seven Bridges Walk, a free community event that promotes walking as a way of staying fit and active, and consisted of a circuit that crossed seven of Sydney's bridges, including the Sydney Harbour, Pyrmont, Anzac, Iron Cove, Gladesville, and Fig Tree bridges.

The rowing boathouses of the rowing club of Sydney Girls High School, the University of New South Wales, and St Joseph's College are located on the shore of the Tarban Creek.

== See also ==
- List of bridges in Sydney
