= Huntleys Point =

- Suburb
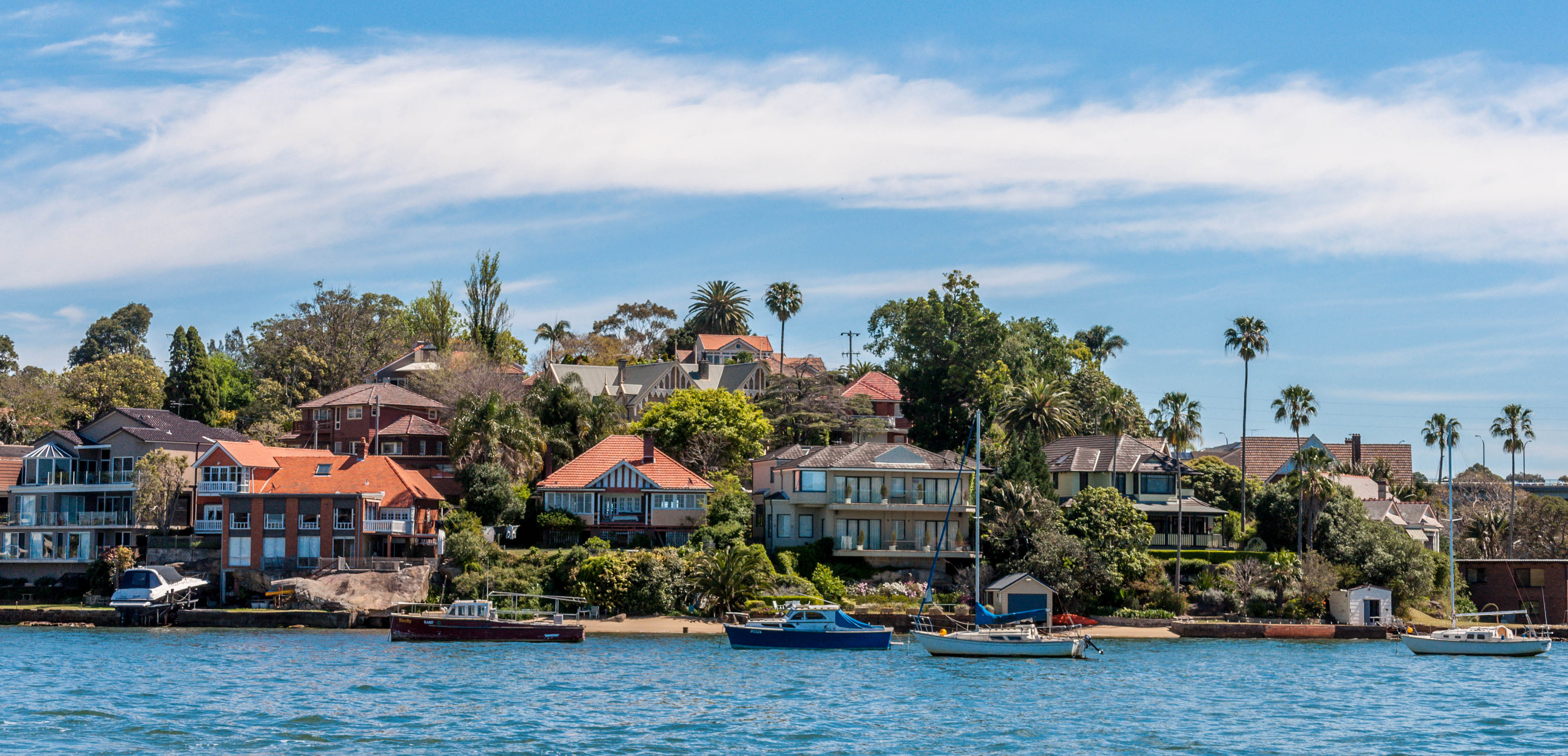
- Huntleys Point from the Parramatta River

- Interactive map of Huntleys Point
- Coordinates: 33°50′20″S 151°08′49″E
- Country: Australia
- State: New South Wales
- City: Sydney
- LGA: Municipality of Hunter's Hill
- Location: 9 km (5.6 mi) north-west of Sydney CBD

Government
  - State electorate: Lane Cove
  - Federal division: Bennelong

Population
  - Total: 142 (2021 census)
- Postcode: 2111
Suburbs around Huntleys Point
Hunters Hill	Hunters Hill	Hunters Hill
Huntleys Cove	Huntleys Point	Hunters Hill
Henley	Chiswick	Drummoyne

Huntleys Point is a suburb in the Northern Suburbs district of Sydney, in the state of New South Wales, Australia. Huntleys Point is located nine kilometres north-west of the Sydney central business district, in the local government area of the Municipality of Hunter's Hill. Huntleys Point sits on the northern shore of the Parramatta River. It was named after Alfred Reynolds Huntley, who purchased the land now covered by the suburb and built Point House in 1851. He had arrived in the colony with his family in 1836.

Huntleys Point is west of Gladesville Bridge. It is served by the Huntleys Point ferry wharf.

== Gallery ==
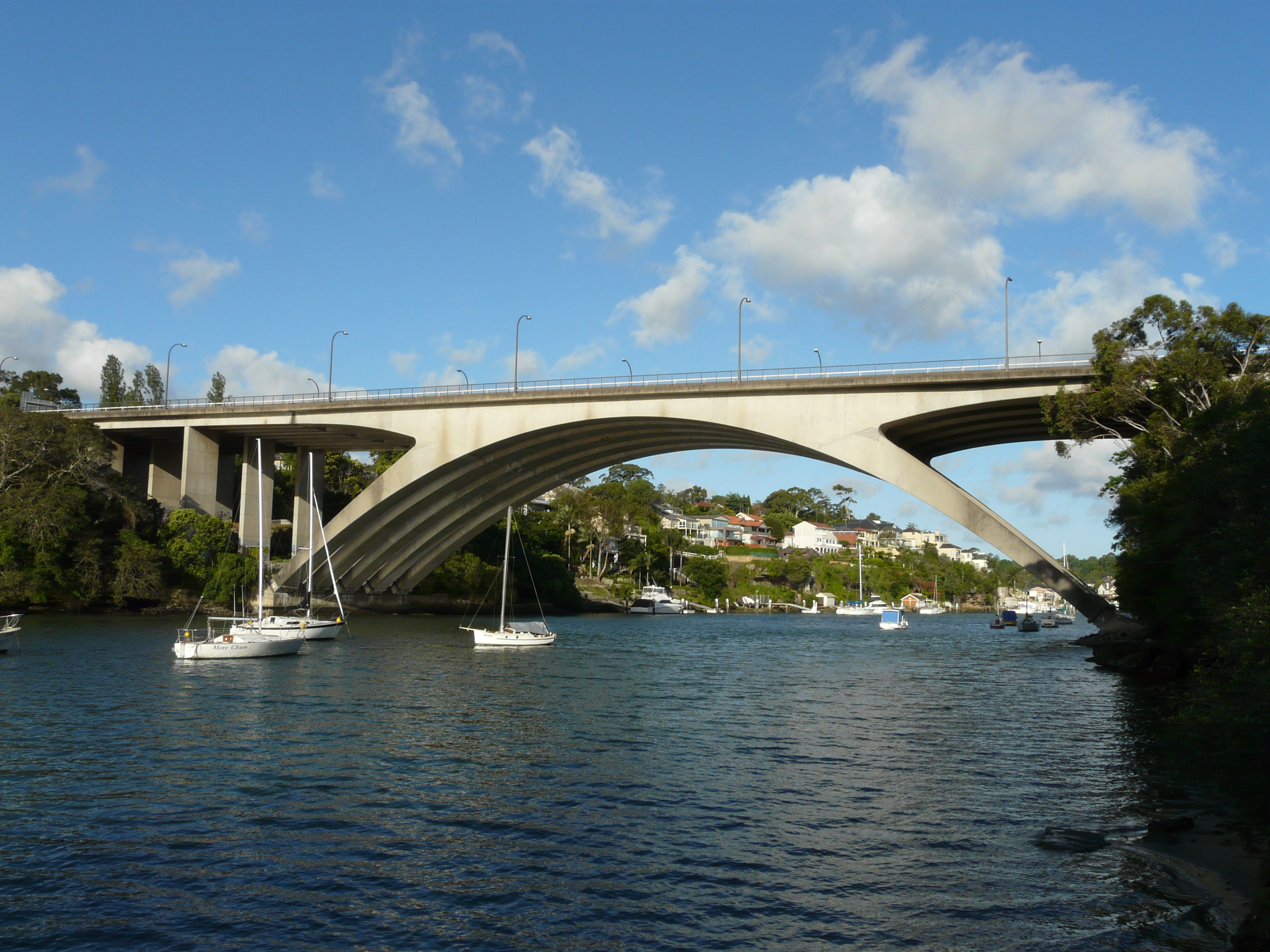
Tarban Creek Bridge

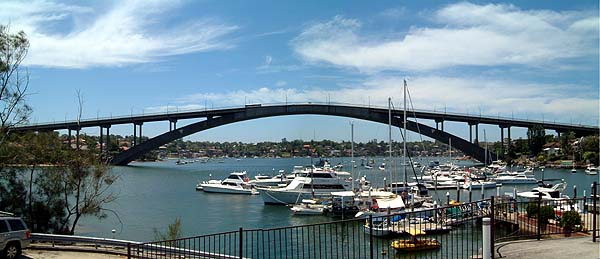
Gladesville Bridge

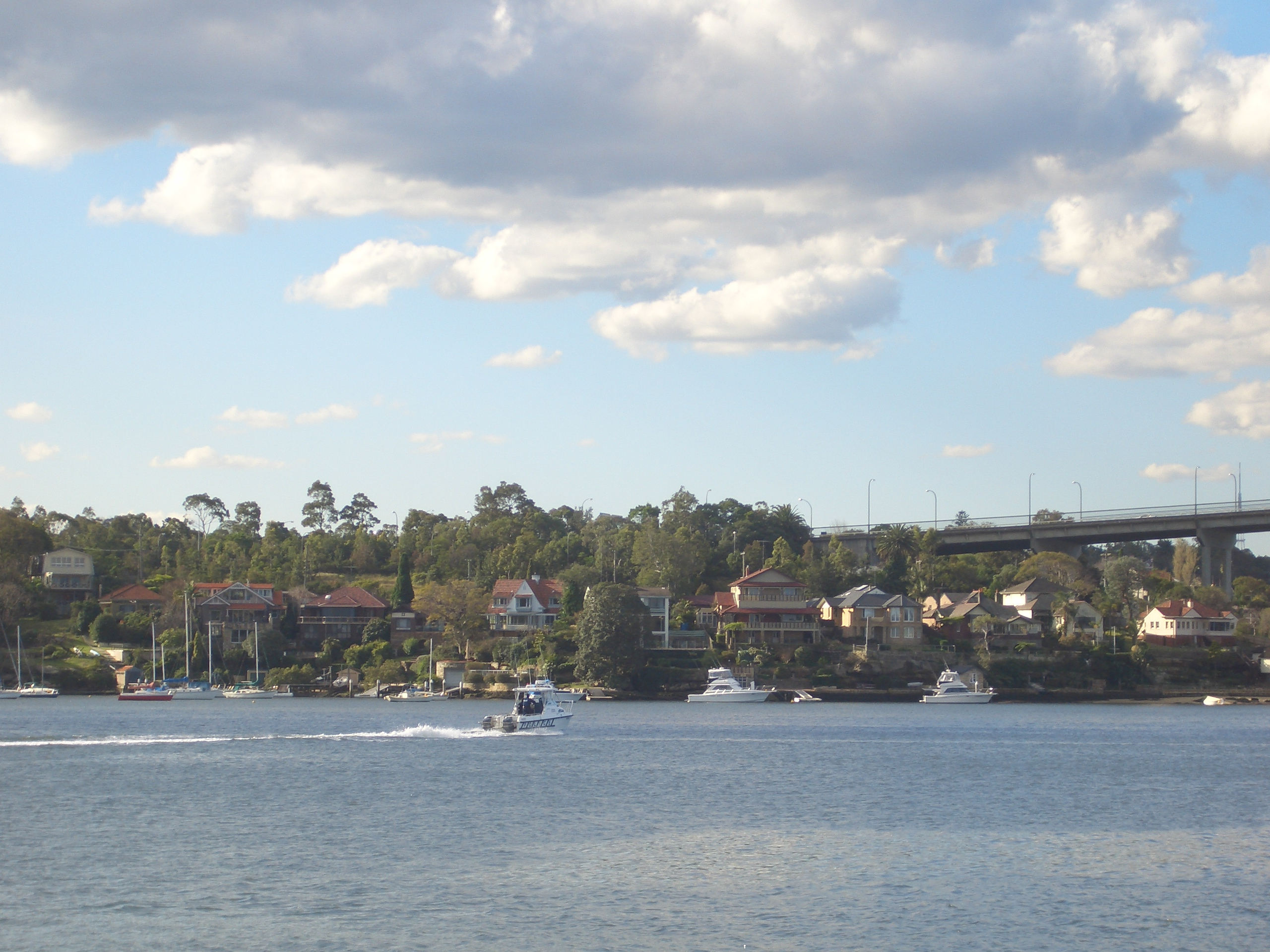
Huntleys Point, view from Chiswick
