= Chalet (disambiguation) =

A chalet is a type of building or house, typical of the Alpine region in Europe.

Chalet or variations thereof may also refer to:

== People ==
- Cherith Norman Chalet, American diplomat
- Laurent Chalet (born 1969), French cinematographer

== Arts and entertainment ==
- Le chalet, an 1834 French opéra comique in one act
- The Chalet (TV series), a six-episode French series
- The Chalets, an Irish band active from 2001 to 2008

== Other uses ==
- Vortex (satellite), formerly called Chalet, a class of American spy satellite
- Chalet (typeface), a series of fonts based on Helvetica
- The Chalet, Hunters Hill, a heritage-listed residence in Hunter's Hill, New South Wales, Australia
- Chalet, Una, a village in Himachal Pradesh, India
- CHALET, a mnemonic for a UK emergency services protocol

== See also ==
- The Chalet (disambiguation)
- Le Locle Le Chalet railway station, also known as Le Chalet NE, Le Locle, Neuchâtel, Switzerland
- Cholet (disambiguation)
