= Emergency response fee =

Fee for emergency services in the United States

In the United States, an emergency response fee, also known as fire department charge, fire department service charge, accident response fee, accident fee, Traffic Infraction Accident Fee, ambulance fee, etc., and pejoratively as a crash tax is a fee for emergency services such as firefighting, emergency medical services, environmental response, etc., performed by a local fire department, EMTs, police department, etc., at the scene of a structure fire, wildfire, traffic collision, or other emergency, billed afterward to the surviving property owner or owner(s), operator(s) of the vehicle(s) involved, and/or their insurance companies.

Many states and localities have approved these fees. Many states and localities prohibit these fees.

Some fire departments charge small and large fees for firefighting. Some bill the survivors, some bill the insurance companies of the survivors.

Some fire departments charge an advance fire subscription fee for fire protection. They often do not fight fires that are not covered, refusing offers of back payment.

The fees are controversial, with multiple arguments for and against.
