= Cholet (disambiguation) =

Cholet may also refer to:

- Cholet, commune of western France in the Maine-et-Loire department
- Cholet, Bolivian architectural phenomenon
- Cholet Island, island in the Wilhelm Archipelago
- Jean Cholet, French cardinal and Doctor utriusque iure
- Madame Cholet, a Womble

== See also ==
- Battle of Cholet (disambiguation)
- Chalet (disambiguation)
- Colet
