= The Chalet =

The Chalet may refer to:

- The Chalet, Hunters Hill, heritage-listed residence in Sydney, New South Wales, Australia
- The Chalet, Mount Martha, heritage-listed house in Melbourne, Victoria, Sydney
- The Chalet (TV series), French television series
- The Chalet School, series of 64 school story novels by Elinor M. Brent-Dyer
- The Chalets, five-piece band from Dublin, Ireland

== See also ==
- Chalet (disambiguation)
