= Emergency =

Situation requiring urgent intervention

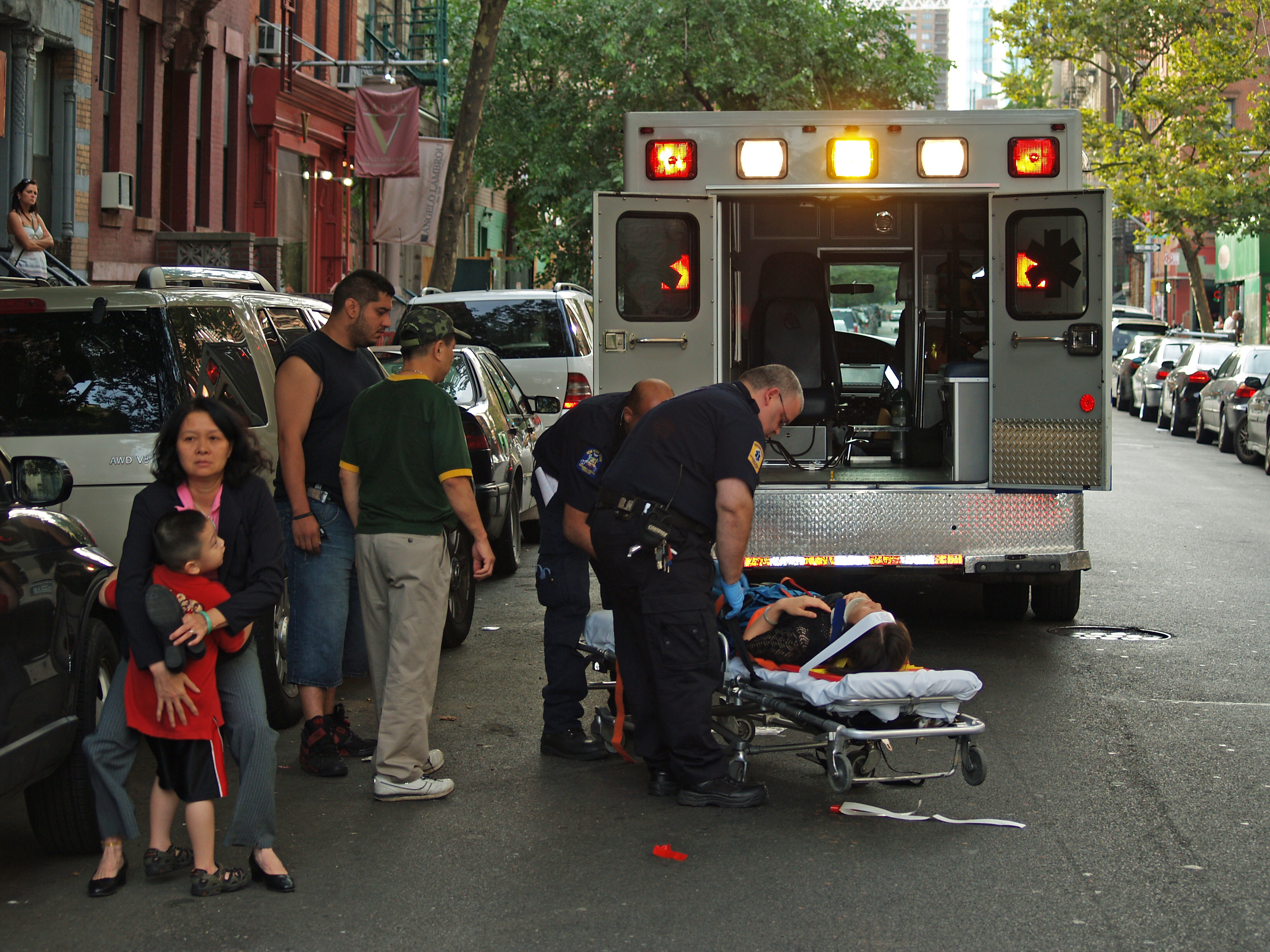
An emergency medical technician treats a woman who has collapsed in the street in New York. Dangers to life and health are serious enough that emergency response systems are considered vital.

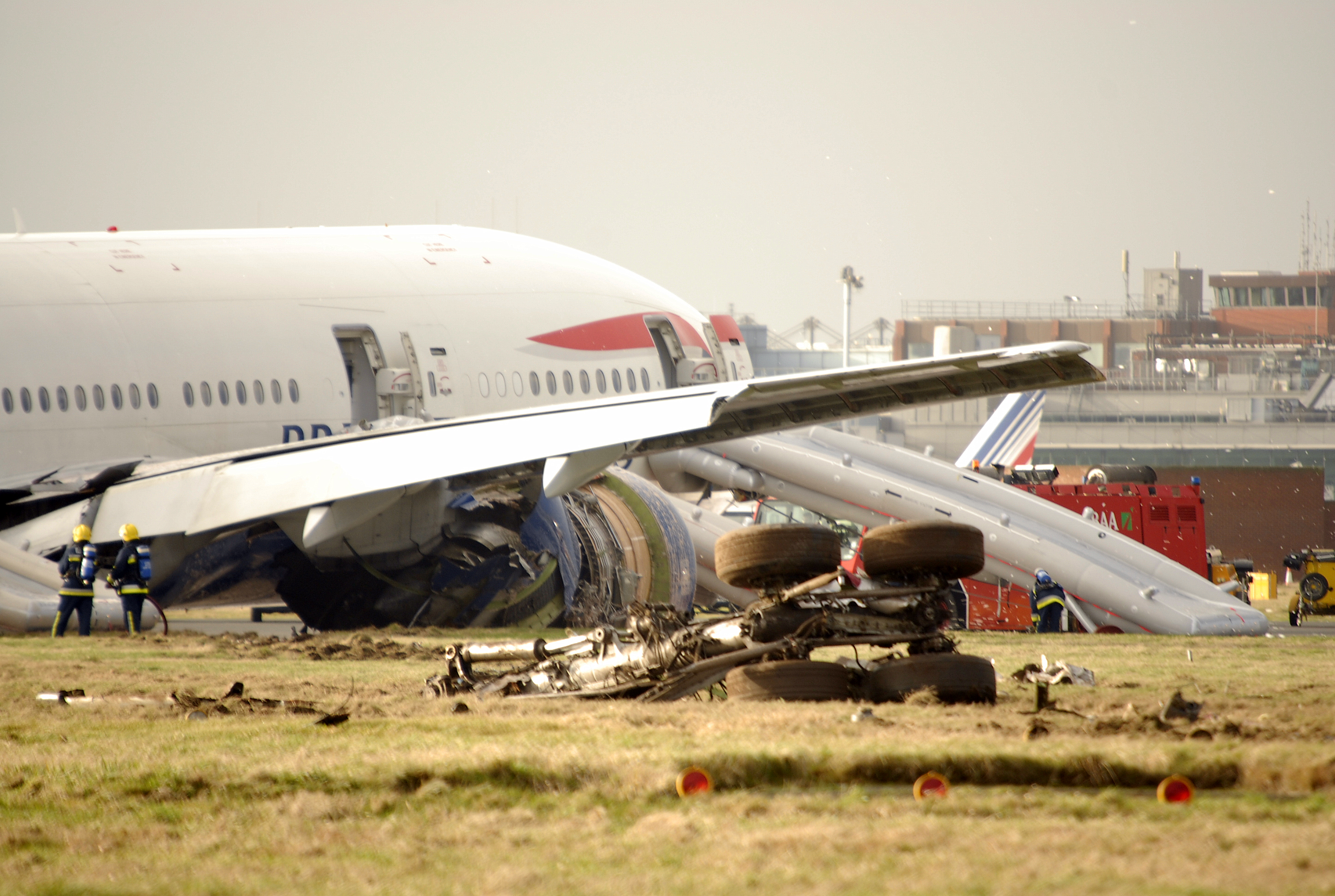
Emergency slides are deployed after the crash landing of British Airways Flight 38

An emergency is an urgent, unexpected, and usually dangerous situation that poses an immediate risk to health, life, property, or environment and requires immediate action. Most emergencies require urgent intervention to prevent a worsening of the situation, although in some situations, mitigation may not be possible and agencies may only be able to offer palliative care for the aftermath.

While some emergencies are self-evident (such as a natural disaster that threatens many lives), many smaller incidents require that an observer (or affected party) decide whether it qualifies as an emergency. The precise definition of an emergency, the agencies involved and the procedures used, vary by jurisdiction, and this is usually set by the government, whose agencies (emergency services) are responsible for emergency planning and management.

== Defining an emergency ==
An incident, to be an emergency, conforms to one or more of the following, if it:

- Poses an immediate threat to life, health, property, or environment
- Has already caused loss of life, health detriments, property damage, or environmental damage
- has a high probability of escalating to cause immediate danger to life, health, property, or environment

In the United States, most states mandate that a notice be printed in each telephone book that requires that someone must relinquish use of a phone line, if a person requests the use of a telephone line (such as a party line) to report an emergency. State statutes typically define an emergency as, "...a condition where life, health, or property is in jeopardy, and the prompt summoning of aid is essential."

Whilst most emergency services agree on protecting human health, life and property, the environmental impacts are not considered sufficiently important by some agencies. This also extends to areas such as animal welfare, where some emergency organizations cover this element through the "property" definition, where animals owned by a person are threatened (although this does not cover wild animals). This means that some agencies do not mount an "emergency" response where it endangers wild animals or environment, though others respond to such incidents (such as oil spills at sea that threaten marine life). The attitude of the agencies involved is likely to reflect the predominant opinion of the government of the area.

== Types of emergency ==
=== Dangers to life ===
Many emergencies cause an immediate danger to the life of people involved. This can range from emergencies affecting a single person, such as the entire range of medical emergencies including heart attacks, strokes, cardiac arrest and trauma, to incidents that affect large numbers of people such as natural disasters including tornadoes, hurricanes, floods, earthquakes, mudslides and outbreaks of diseases such as coronavirus, cholera, Ebola, and malaria.

Most agencies consider these the highest priority emergency, which follows the general school of thought that nothing is more important than human life.

=== Dangers to health ===
Some emergencies are not necessarily immediately threatening to life, but might have serious implications for the continued health and well-being of a person or persons (though a health emergency can subsequently escalate to life-threatening).

The causes of a health emergency are often very similar to the causes of an emergency threatening to life, which includes medical emergencies and natural disasters, although the range of incidents that can be categorized here is far greater than those that cause a danger to life (such as broken limbs, which do not usually cause death, but immediate intervention is required if the person is to recover properly). Many life emergencies, such as cardiac arrest, are also health emergencies.

=== Dangers to the environment ===
Some emergencies do not immediately endanger life, health or property, but do affect the natural environment and creatures living within it. Not all agencies consider this a genuine emergency, but it can have far-reaching effects on animals and the long term condition of the land. Examples would include forest fires and marine oil spills.

== Systems of classifying emergencies ==
Agencies across the world have different systems for classifying incidents, but all of them serve to help them allocate finite resource, by prioritising between different emergencies.

The first stage of any classification is likely to define whether the incident qualifies as an emergency, and consequently if it warrants an emergency response. Some agencies may still respond to non-emergency calls, depending on their remit and availability of resource. An example of this would be a fire department responding to help retrieve a cat from a tree, where no life, health or property is immediately at risk.

Following this, many agencies assign a sub-classification to the emergency, prioritising incidents that have the most potential for risk to life, health or property (in that order). For instance, many ambulance services use a system called the Advanced Medical Priority Dispatch System (AMPDS) or a similar solution. The AMPDS categorises all calls to the ambulance service using it as either 'A' category (immediately life-threatening), 'B' Category (immediately health threatening) or 'C' category (non-emergency call that still requires a response). Some services have a fourth category, where they believe that no response is required after clinical questions are asked.

Another system for prioritizing medical calls is known as Emergency Medical Dispatch (EMD). Jurisdictions that use EMD typically assign a code of "alpha" (low priority), "bravo" (medium priority), "charlie" (requiring advanced life support), delta (high priority, requiring advanced life support) or "echo" (maximum possible priority, e.g., witnessed cardiac arrests) to each inbound request for service; these codes are then used to determine the appropriate level of response.

Other systems (especially as regards major incidents) use objective measures to direct resource. Two such systems are SAD CHALET and ETHANE, which are both mnemonics to help emergency services staff classify incidents, and direct resource. Each of these acronyms helps ascertain the number of casualties (usually including the number of dead and number of non-injured people involved), how the incident has occurred, and what emergency services are required.

== Agencies involved in dealing with emergencies ==
Most developed countries have a number of emergency services operating within them, whose purpose is to provide assistance in dealing with any emergency. They are often government operated, paid for from tax revenue as a public service, but in some cases, they may be private companies, responding to emergencies in return for payment, or they may be voluntary organisations, providing the assistance from funds raised from donations.

Most developed countries operate three core emergency services:

- Police – handle mainly crime-related emergencies.
- Fire – handle fire-related emergencies and usually possess secondary rescue duties.
- Medical – handle medical-related emergencies.

There may also be a number of specialized emergency services, which may be a part of one of the core agencies, or may be separate entities who assist the main agencies. This can include services, such as bomb disposal, search and rescue, and hazardous material operations.

The Military and the Amateur Radio Emergency Service (ARES) or Radio Amateur Civil Emergency Service (RACES) help in large emergencies such as a disaster or major civil unrest.

=== Summoning emergency services ===
Most countries have an emergency telephone number, also known as the universal emergency number, which can be used to summon the emergency services to any incident. This number varies from country to country (and in some cases by region within a country), but in most cases, they are in a short number format, such as 911 (United States and many parts of Canada), 999 (United Kingdom), 112 (Europe) and 000 (Australia).

The majority of mobile phones also dial the emergency services, even if the phone keyboard is locked, or if the phone has an expired or missing SIM card, although the provision of this service varies by country and network.

=== Civil emergency services ===
In addition to those services provided specifically for emergencies, there may be a number of agencies who provide an emergency service as an incidental part of their normal 'day job' provision. This can include public utility workers, such as in provision of electricity or gas, who may be required to respond quickly, as both utilities have a large potential to cause danger to life, health and property if there is an infrastructure failure.

=== Domestic emergency services ===
Generally perceived as pay per use emergency services, domestic emergency services are small, medium or large businesses who tend to emergencies within the boundaries of licensing or capabilities. These tend to consist of emergencies where health or property is perceived to be at risk but may not qualify for official emergency response. Domestic emergency services are in principle similar to civil emergency services where public or private utility workers will perform corrective repairs to essential services and avail their service at all times; however, these are at a cost for the service. An example would be an emergency plumber.

== Emergency action principles (EAP) ==
Emergency action principles are key 'rules' that guide the actions of rescuers and potential rescuers. Because of the inherent nature of emergencies, no two are likely to be the same, so emergency action principles help to guide rescuers at incidents, by sticking to some basic tenets.

The adherence to (and contents of) the principles by would-be rescuers varies widely based on the training the people involved in emergency have received, the support available from emergency services (and the time it takes to arrive) and the emergency itself.

=== Key emergency principle ===
The key principle taught in almost all systems is that the rescuer, whether a lay person or a professional, should assess the situation for danger.

The reason that an assessment for danger is given such high priority is that it is core to emergency management that rescuers do not become secondary victims of any incident, as this creates a further emergency that must be dealt with.

A typical assessment for danger would involve observation of the surroundings, starting with the cause of the accident (e.g. a falling object) and expanding outwards to include any situational hazards (e.g. fast moving traffic) and history or secondary information given by witnesses, bystanders or the emergency services (e.g. an attacker still waiting nearby).

Once a primary danger assessment has been completed, this should not end the system of checking for danger, but should inform all other parts of the process.

If at any time the risk from any hazard poses a significant danger (as a factor of likelihood and seriousness) to the rescuer, they should consider whether they should approach the scene (or leave the scene if appropriate).

== Managing an emergency ==
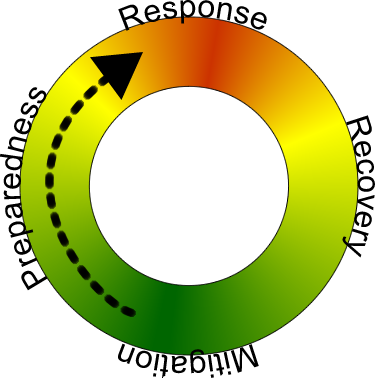
A graphic representation of the four phases in emergency management.

There are many emergency services protocols that apply in an emergency, which usually start with planning before an emergency occurs. One commonly used system for demonstrating the phases is shown here on the right.

The planning phase starts at preparedness, where the agencies decide how to respond to a given incident or set of circumstances. This should ideally include lines of command and control, and division of activities between agencies. This avoids potentially negative situations such as three separate agencies all starting an official emergency shelter for victims of a disaster.

Following an emergency occurring, the agencies then move to a response phase, where they execute their plans, and may end up improvising some areas of their response (due to gaps in the planning phase, which are inevitable due to the individual nature of most incidents).

Agencies may then be involved in recovery following the incident, where they assist in the clear up from the incident, or help the people involved overcome their mental trauma.

The final phase in the circle is mitigation, which involves taking steps to ensure no re-occurrence is possible, or putting additional plans in place to ensure less damage is done. This should feed back into the preparedness stage, with updated plans in place to deal with future emergencies, thus completing the circle.

== State of emergency ==
In the event of a major incident, such as civil unrest or a major disaster, many governments maintain the right to declare a state of emergency, which gives them extensive powers over the daily lives of their citizens, and may include temporary curtailment on certain civil rights, including the right to trial. For instance to discourage looting of an evacuated area, a shoot on sight policy, however unlikely to occur, may be publicized.

== See also ==
- Certified first responder
- First aid
- Emergency Communication System
- Emergency medical service
- Emergency Response Information Network
- Emergency sanitation
- Lockdown
- Prevention
- Natural disaster
- Maritime emergency
- SWAT (Special Weapons And Tactics)
- Faz'ah
