= CHALET =

CHALET was a mnemonic or prompt indicating a protocol used by United Kingdom (UK) emergency services to report situations that they may be faced with, especially as it relates to major incidents.

Since 2013, the United Kingdom emergency services have been using a new doctrine developed by the Joint Emergency Services Interoperability Principles (JESIP), which sets out the mnemonic ETHANE as an aid to communicating information from the incident scene. CHALET and ETHANE dictate the form in which the receiving control station should get information from the first person or officer on the scene. In some jurisdictions, the alternative ETHANE may be used.

CHALET stands for;

- Casualties: Approximate numbers of dead, injured, and uninjured and approximate numbers of priority 1, 2, and 3 patients, dead, and uninjured
- Hazards: Present and potential.
- Access: Best access routes for emergency vehicles, bottlenecks to avoid, etc.
- Location: The precise location of the incident
- Emergency: Emergency services that are already on scene and others that are required
- Type: Type of incident, including details of the number of vehicles, buildings, etc. involved

ETHANE stands for:

- Exact location: The precise location of the incident
- Type: The nature of the incident, including how many vehicles, buildings, etc. are involved
- Hazards: Both present and potential
- Access: The best route for emergency services to access the site, or obstructions and bottlenecks to avoid
- Numbers: Numbers of casualties, dead, and un injured on scene
- Emergency services: Which services are already on scene and which others are required

In the event of this being used for a major incident, the reporting first on-scene officer would not usually get involved with the rescue work but act as a coordinator on the scene for arriving emergency vehicles. This individual would often assume the role of "silver" ambulance/police/fire depending on their service. This is in line with the widely used Gold Silver Bronze command structure.

The silver commander at an incident usually operates from a command vehicle. Before a specially designed vehicle arrives, an improvised command vehicle is appointed by leaving one vehicle's lightbar/blue lights running while the others turn theirs off.
