= Battle of Cholet =

The Battle of Cholet may refer to:

- The First Battle of Cholet, a battle of the War in the Vendée in March 1793.
- The Second Battle of Cholet, battle of the French Revolutionary Wars in October 1793.
