= Emergency Response Information Network =

Television channel owned by Dish Network

The Emergency Response Information Network (ERIN), is a 24-hour hurricane TV channel set up by the Dish Network. It was formerly called the Katrina Information Network. Dish Network set up the channel to provide information on missing people from Hurricane Katrina, but then changed the name before Hurricane Rita came ashore. Dish Network provides the channel free of charge to all Dish customers. Important phone numbers and other updates provided by hurricane relief agencies are shown in addition to the names of missing or dislocated children and adults.

ERIN is currently shown on channel 206, and was developed by Flying Colors Broadcasts, a Washington, D.C.–based company.
