= Emergency service =

Organizations that ensure public safety and health by addressing different emergencies

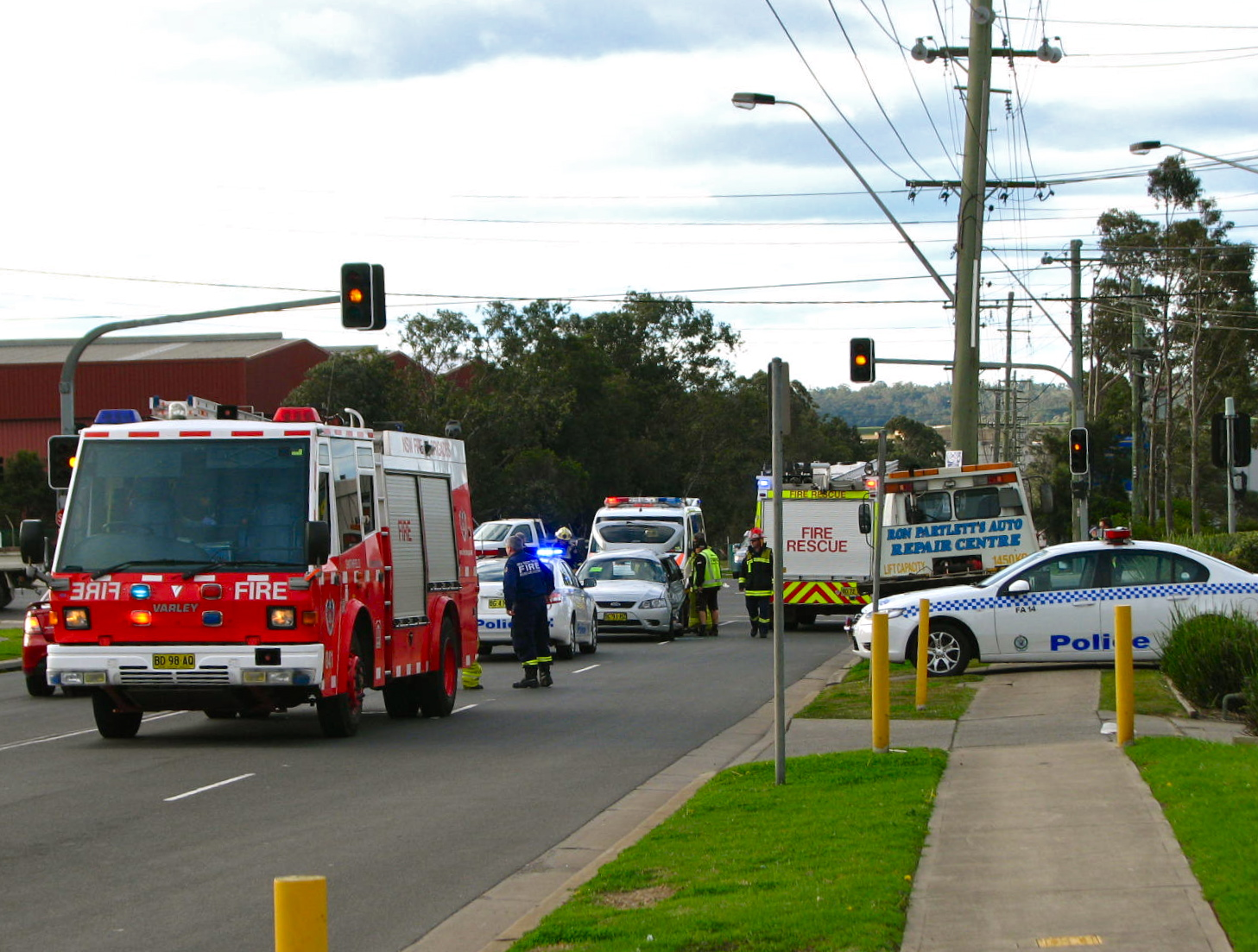
Police, fire, and medical services at the scene of a traffic collision in New South Wales, Australia

Emergency services and rescue services are organizations that ensure public safety, security, and health by addressing and resolving different emergencies. Some of these agencies exist solely for addressing certain types of emergencies, while others deal with ad hoc emergencies as part of their normal responsibilities. Many of these agencies engage in community awareness and prevention programs to help the public avoid, detect, and report emergencies effectively. Emergency services are often considered first responders, and typically have dedicated emergency vehicles.

Emergency services have one or more dedicated emergency telephone numbers reserved for critical emergency calls. In many countries, one number is used for all of the emergency services (e.g. 911 in many parts of the Americas, 999 in the United Kingdom, 112 in continental Europe, 000 in Australia). In some countries, each emergency service has its own emergency number (e.g. 110 for police, 118 for coast guard, 119 for fire and medical in Japan; 110 for police, 119 for fire, 120 for medical in China).

In some countries, the availability of emergency services may rely on the recipient giving payment or holding suitable insurance or other surety for receiving the service.

== Types of emergency services ==
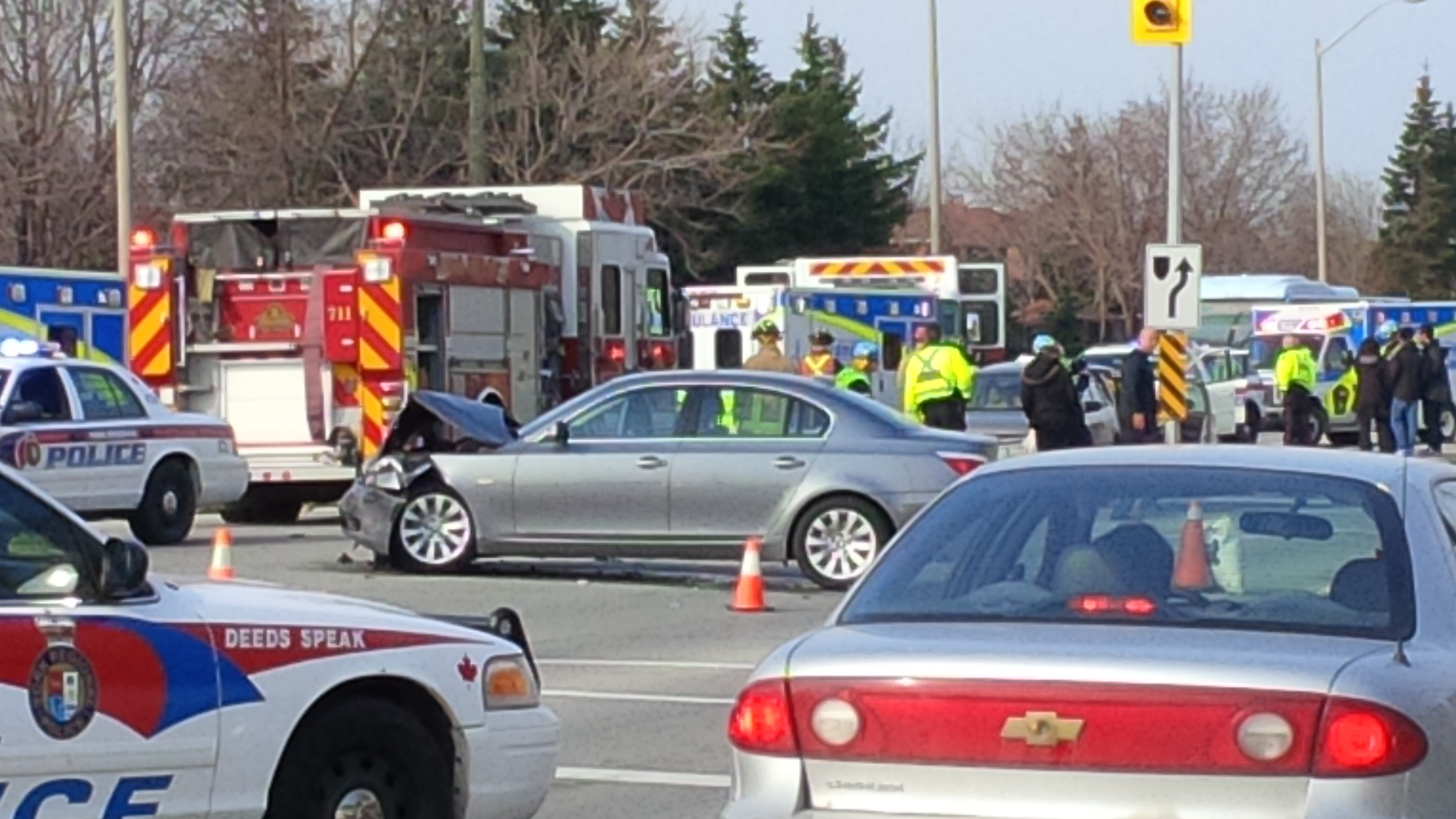
Multiple emergency services at the scene of a traffic accident in Vaughan, Ontario

=== Primary emergency services ===
Primary emergency services are emergency services that provide basic emergency assistance and care. They can be summoned directly by the public. There are three primary emergency services and they are listed in the following order.

- Police – These agencies provide law enforcement, crime suppression and prevention, criminal investigation, and maintenance of public order. There are a variety of similar law enforcement agencies such as gendarmerie, but police are the most common. Law enforcement agencies may differ in jurisdiction (federal police, state police, county police, municipal police, national police, etc.), specific role (water police, special police, etc.), capabilities (auxiliary police, riot police, police tactical unit, etc.), and oversight (private police by private entities, military police by militaries
  - Police officer – Law enforcement, crime suppression, protection of the general public
- Fireflghter department – These agencies provide fire suppression and protection, fire prevention, special operations and technical rescue response services, emergency medical response services and hazardous materials mitigation. They may be government organizations or private services. Rescue, fire suppression and prevention
- Emergency medical services – These agencies provide emergency medicine, air medical services, patient transport, and technical rescue services. They may be government organizations, private services, or charity-run, and may be their own independent service or part of another agency such as a fire department or health ministry.
  - Paramedics – Medical aid, assistance and rescue of injured people

=== Specialized emergency services ===
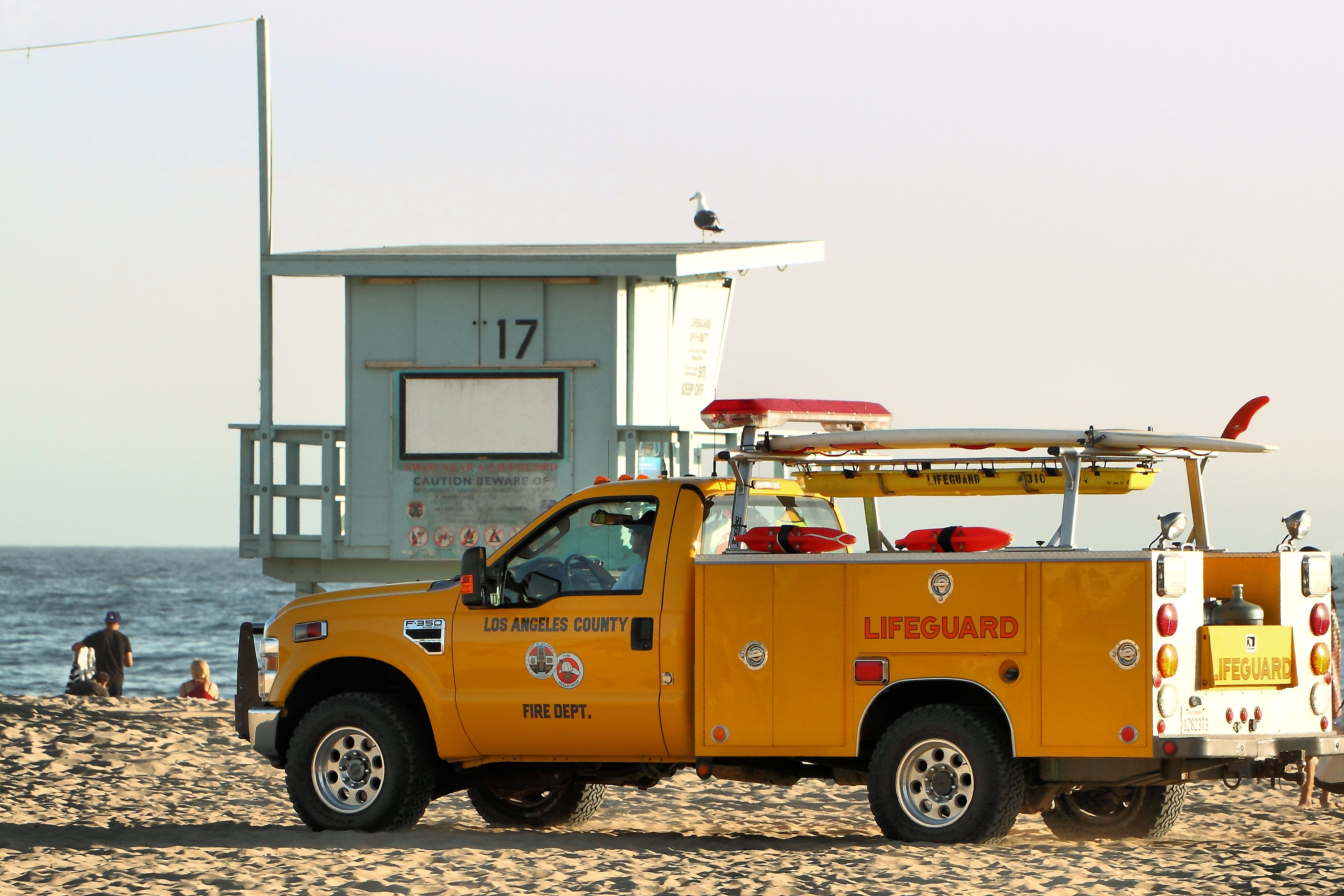
Lifeguards on duty at Santa Monica State Beach in Los Angeles County, California

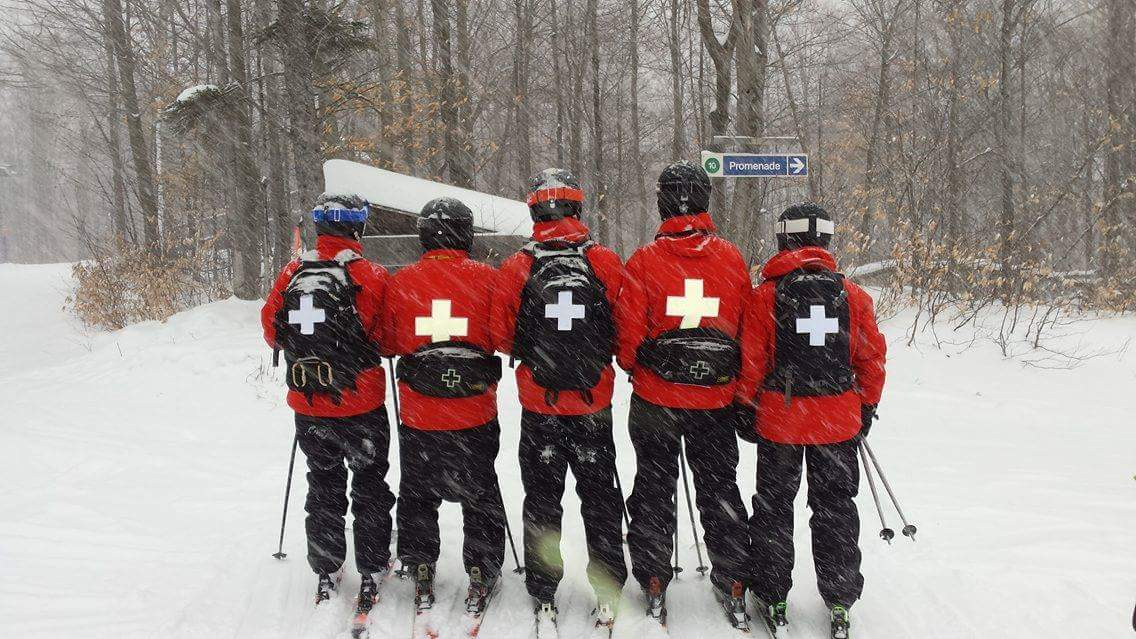
Ski patrol team at Ski Montcalm in Quebec, Canada

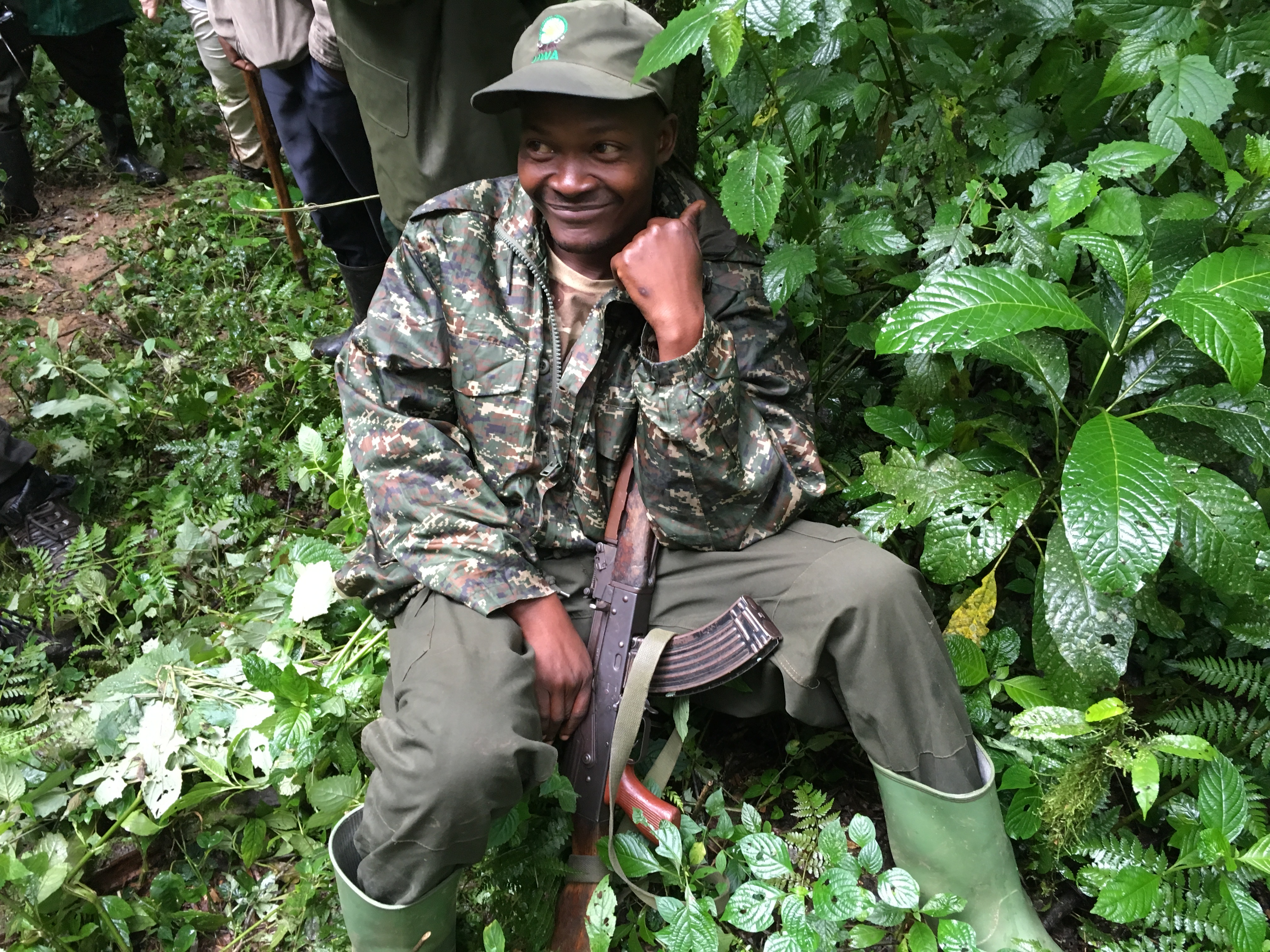
Park ranger in Bwindi Impenetrable National Park, Uganda

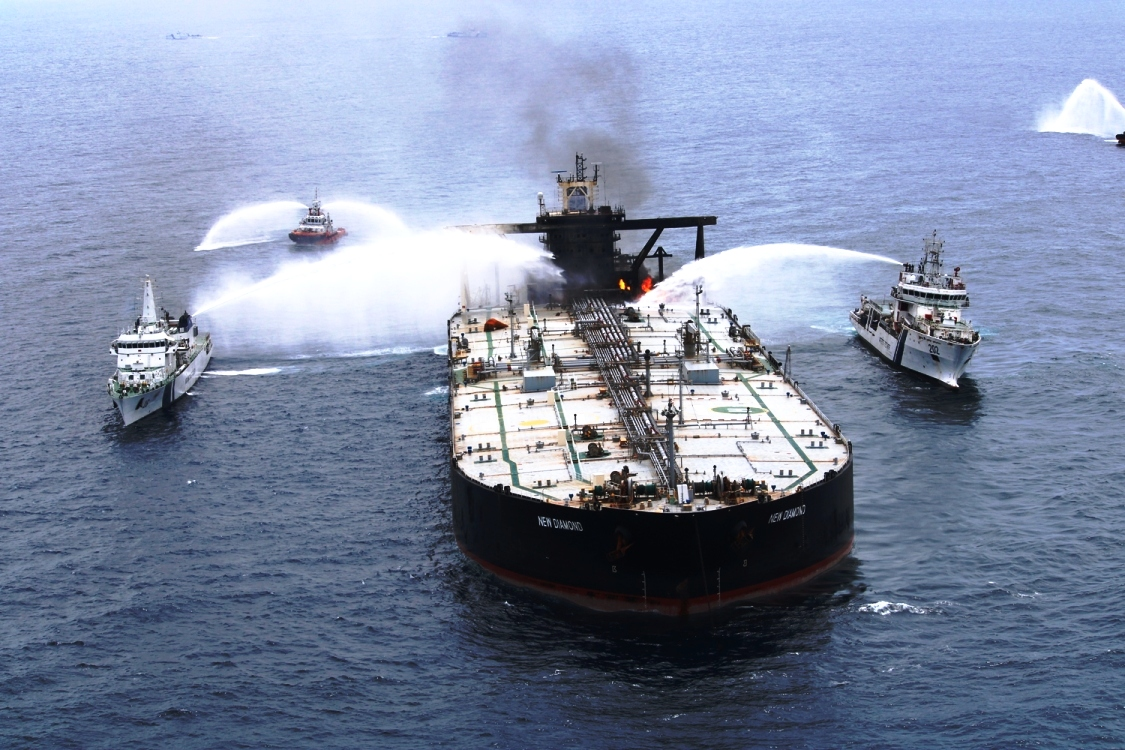
Indian Coast Guard and Sri Lanka Coast Guard vessels fighting a ship fire

Specialized emergency services are emergency services that are not considered one of the three primary emergency services. They can be provided by one of the primary emergency services (often as a division or unit) or by a separate governmental or private body.

Specialized emergency services may typically be contacted and requested by the public, unless they are a division or unit of a primary emergency service. They may also often be requested by primary emergency services to handle certain emergencies or augment existing emergency services personnel. Some of these services may be location-specific and have jurisdiction over specific areas or situations, with little if any authority outside them.

In some jurisdictions, specialized emergency services may be allowed to use emergency lights on their vehicles, often yellow or amber lights unless they are already part of a primary emergency service, in which case they typically use the emergency lighting configuration used by their respective emergency service.

- Animal control service – Animal assistance, ensuring public safety around animals
- Bomb squad – Bomb disposal, hazardous material disposal, weapons and munitions disposal
- Border guard – Border control, border security, border protection
- Bylaw enforcement – Enforcement of local ordinance
- Civil defense – Disaster protection, wartime civilian protection, rescue aid
- Coast guard – Maritime law enforcement and rescue within national waters
- Conservation officer – Wildlife protection, wildlife law enforcement, hunting and fishing enforcement
- Coroner – Death confirmation, cause of death identification
  - Medical examiner – Death investigation
- Emergency management – Incident management, coordination in major emergencies
- Humanitarian aid – Basic aid and care for people in need
- Incident response team – Specialized incident response
- Lifeguards – Medical aid and rescue at pools, beaches, shorelines, dive spots
- Military – National defense, internal security, emergency assistance (in certain situations and jurisdictions)
- Mobile Crisis – Mental health crisis response including evaluations, de-escalation, and referral to other services
- Park rangers – Law enforcement in parks and nature reserves
- Poison control center – Advice on poison exposure
- Prison officer – Law enforcement and first response within correctional facilities
- Public utilities – Safeguarding and maintaining utilities and infrastructure
- Public works – Assessing, cleaning, and repairing infrastructure
- Roadside assistance – Aiding motorists in need of assistance, conducting vehicle maintenance and repairs
- Urban areas Search and rescue Rescue of missing, trapped, or at-risk victims
  - Avalanche rescue – Rescue of victims in avalanches
  - Cave rescue – Rescue of victims in caves and underground areas
  - Mountain rescue – Rescue of victims on mountains or in wilderness areas
  - Air-sea rescue – Rescue of victims in air and water areas
- Security guards – Asset protection, property protection, private enforcement
- Ski patrol – Medical aid and rescue at ski resorts and mountain resorts
- Tow truck – Moving disabled, impounded, or illegally-parked vehicles

== Cooperation ==
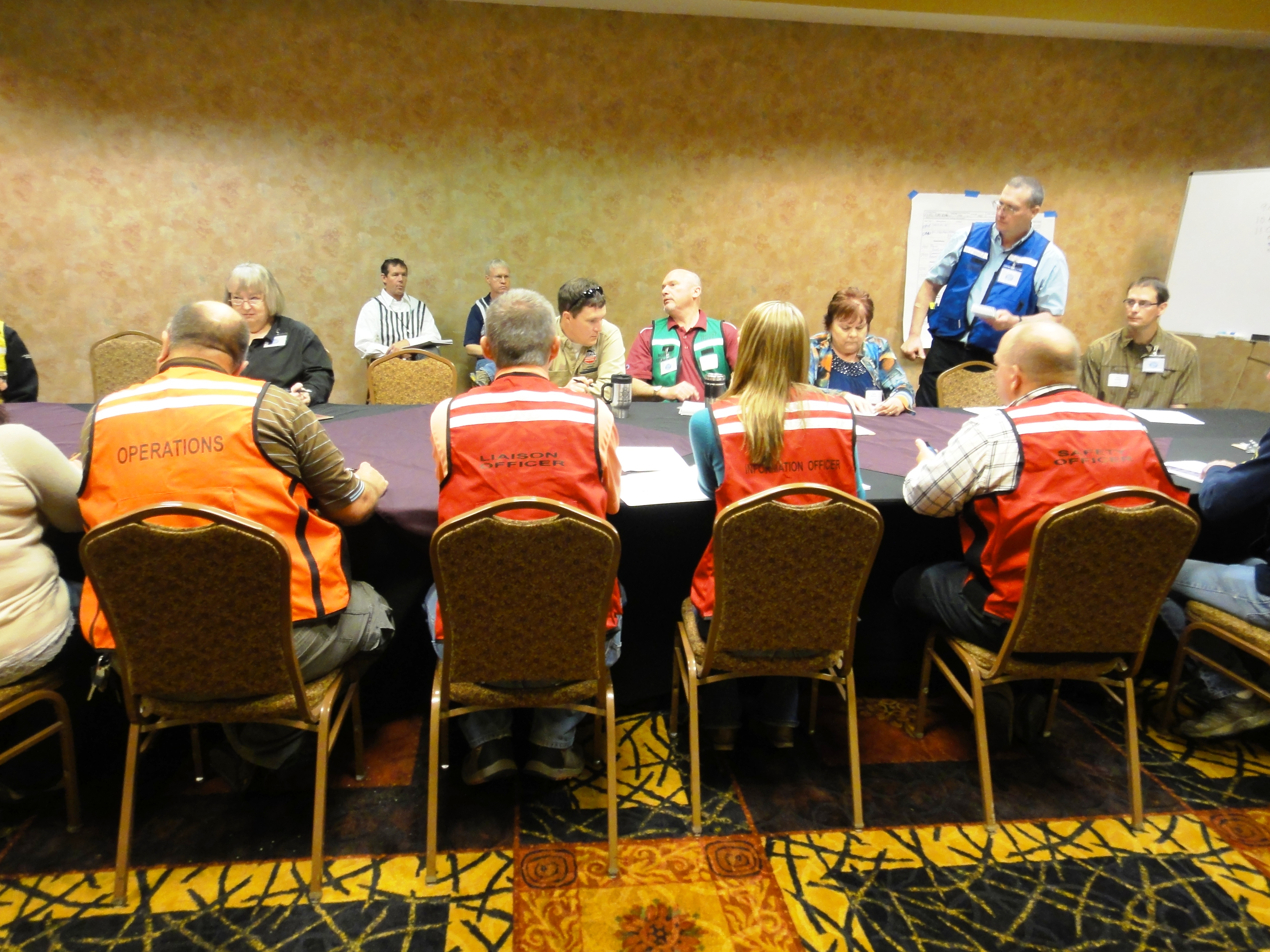
EPA staff coordinate with local agencies in 2014 environmental disaster simulation

Effective emergency service management requires agencies from many different services to work closely together and to have open lines of communication. Most services do, or should, have procedures and liaisons in place to ensure this, although absence of these can be severely detrimental to good working. There can sometimes be tension between services for a number of other reasons, including professional versus voluntary crew members, or simply based on area or division. To aid effective communications, different services may share common practices and protocol for certain large-scale emergencies. In the UK, commonly used shared protocols include CHALET and ETHANE while in the US, the Department of Homeland Security has called for nationwide implementation of the National Incident Management System (NIMS), of which the Incident Command System (ICS) is a part.

=== Disaster response technologies ===
Smart Emergency Response System (SERS) prototype was built in the SmartAmerica Challenge 2013–2014, a United States government initiative. SERS was created by a team of nine organizations. The project was featured at the White House in June 2014 and called an exemplary achievement by Todd Park (U.S. Chief Technology Officer).

The SmartAmerica initiative challenges the participants to build cyber-physical systems as a glimpse of the future to save lives, create jobs, foster businesses, and improve the economy. SERS primarily saves lives. The system provides the survivors and the emergency personnel with information to locate and assist each other during a disaster. SERS allows organization to submit help requests to a MATLAB-based mission center connecting first responders, apps, search-and-rescue dogs, a 6-feet-tall humanoid, robots, drones, and autonomous aircraft and ground vehicles. The command and control center optimizes the available resources to serve every incoming requests and generates an action plan for the mission. The Wi-Fi network is created on the fly by the drones equipped with antennas. In addition, the autonomous rotorcrafts, planes, and ground vehicles are simulated with Simulink and visualized in a 3D environment (Google Earth) to unlock the ability to observe the operations on a mass scale.

== Response time ==
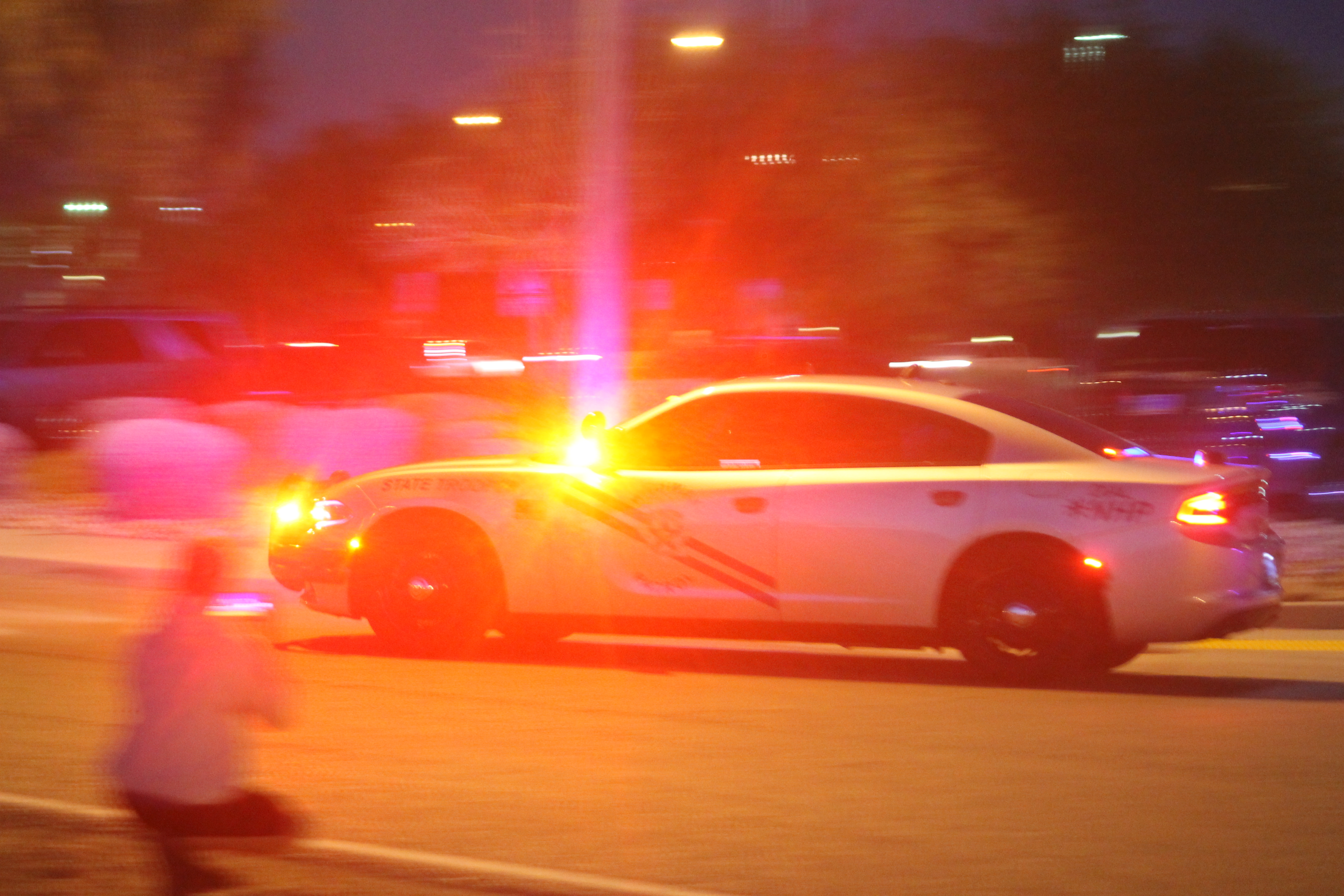
Timely responses by emergency services are crucial. In this image, a Nevada State Police cruiser leaves a police station with its lights and sirens on.

A common measurement in benchmarking the efficacy of emergency services is response time, the amount of time that it takes for emergency responders to arrive at the scene of an incident after the emergency response system was activated. Due to the nature of emergencies, fast response times are often a crucial component of the emergency service system.

== See also ==
- Civil defense
- Emergency management
- Emergency service response codes
- Incident response team
- Public security
- Public service
- Rescue squad
