= ETHANE =

Emergency service protocol

ETHANE is a mnemonic indicating a protocol used by emergency services to report situations which they may be faced with, especially as it relates to major incidents, where it may be used as part of their emergency action principles. An alternative mnemonic METHANE adds an additional prompt "Major Incident Declared?" to ensure consideration is given to if the response may challenge the available resources and so necessitate initiating contingency plan measures.

ETHANE dictates the form in which the receiving control station should get information from the first person or officer on scene. In the UK, the Joint Emergency Services Interoperability Principles (JESIP) set out the way the emergency services respond together to major incidents.

== Definition and process ==
ETHANE stands for:

- Exact location: The precise location of the incident.
- Type: The nature of the incident, including how many vehicles, buildings and so on are involved.
- Hazards: Both present and potential.
- Access: Best route for emergency services to access the site, or obstructions and bottlenecks to avoid.
- Numbers: Numbers of casualties, dead and uninjured on scene.
- Emergency services: Which services are already on scene, and which others are required.

In the event of this being used for a major incident, the reporting first on scene officer would not usually get involved with the rescue work, but act as a co-ordinator on scene for arriving emergency vehicles. This may be achieved by the first vehicle on scene leaving its lightbar running, whilst all others turn theirs off on arrival, to make identifying the incident officer easier.
