= The Chalet, Hunters Hill =

The Chalet
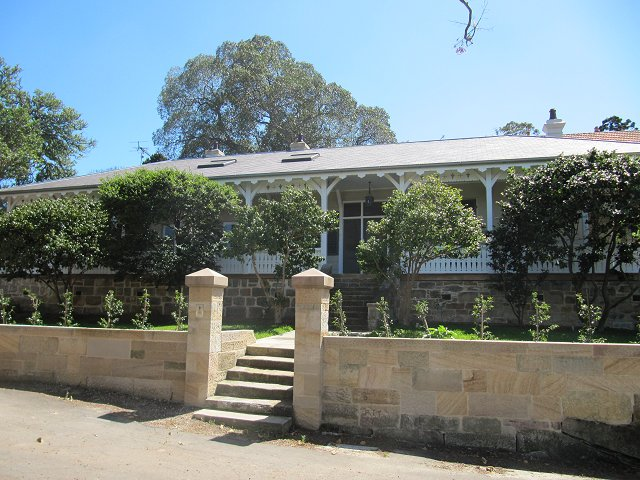

- Location within Sydney Location within Australia
- 33°50′16″S 151°09′16″E
- Location: 2 Yerton Avenue, Hunters Hill, Municipality of Hunter's Hill, New South Wales, Australia

History
- Built: 1855

Site notes
- Architectural style: Victorian

New South Wales Heritage Register
- Official name: The Chalet; The Bungalow (1867); The Nora Heysen Studio
- Type: State heritage (built)
- Designated: 10 June 2005
- Reference no.: 1727
- Type: Other – Residential Buildings (private)
- Category: Residential buildings (private)
- Builders: Assembled by German carpenters: Willhelm Gross; Frederick Lemm; Jacob Arndt

The Chalet is a heritage-listed residence located at 2 Yerton Avenue, Hunters Hill, New South Wales, a suburb of Sydney, Australia. It was designed and built during 1855; and assembled by German carpenters Willhelm Gross, Frederick Lemm, and Jacob Arndt. It is also known as The Bungalow (1867) and The Nora Heysen Studio. The property is privately owned. It was added to the New South Wales State Heritage Register on 10 June 2005.

== History of The Chalet ==
A detailed study of The Chalet is included in "Fine Houses of Sydney" by Robert Irving, John Kinstler and Max Dupain. The following historical outline and description are largely drawn from that study.

The Chalet is the only surviving residence of four prefabricated "Swiss Cottages" that were shipped from Hamburg to Sydney and erected in Hunters Hill during the gold rush period in 1854 or early 1855 by a French-speaking Swiss immigrant Etienne-Jean-Leonard Bordier-Roman shortly after his arrival in Australia. Prior to this time, Bordier and the French Count Gabriel de Milhau (exiled for his part in France's 1848 revolution) had initially settled on the Clarence River, however they were forced to abandon the venture when their workers all downed tools and headed for the NSW goldfields. The houses may have been a prototype for the 1855 Paris Industrial Exhibition that were erected in Hamburg. The Swiss or possibly Bavarian Cottage design was probably selected for its picturesque qualities, and also possibly for nationalistic reasons, as Bordier was Swiss.

The four houses were erected on two whaling land grants of four acres (either side of Ferry Street) purchased by Bordier in 1855, on the Parramatta River in Hunters Hill, as a speculative housing venture. Bordier established a wharf at the end of Ferry Street, which became the suburb's first commercial gateway. A Post Office was set up next to this wharf. Hunters Hill during this period was an established French enclave, with the residence of the French consul Louis Francois Sentis, located in Hunters Hill house of "Passy" (1855-6, 1 Passy Avenue) and much of the area's early development was constructed by men of French descent. The houses were advertised as "four splendid family residences, standing in their own grounds, of about 1 acres each", with "wood and water in abundance".

Beverly Sherry in her study of Hunter Hill notes that this was the first planned group of houses to be built in the municipality, marking the beginning of the garden suburb character of Australia's oldest Garden Suburb. The subdivision and garden suburb development occurred in the mid to late nineteenth century, predating the formation of the Garden Suburb movement. The historic development at Hunters Hill was consistently speculative, although some of the subdivisions were undertaken to provide residences for family members.

The cottages were constructed by three indentured German carpenters: Willhelm Gross, Frederick Lemm and Jacob Arndt. Bordier appears to have been able to speak German, the initial contract being in German and could thus instruct the workmen. One reason for importing indentured German carpenters to Sydney, and paying their board and passage, was to guarantee that the work force would not flee to the gold fields before the job was completed. Two of the three carpenters are known to have remained in NSW, Jacob Arndt in Hunters Hill, and Frederick Lemm who settled in Goulburn. Lemm established a contracting business in Sydney, building Goulburn Gaol for the NSW Government Architect.

The construction of prefabricated houses and the need to import specialised tradesmen was characteristic of the 1850s Gold Rush era in Australia, which caused a shortage of specialised tradesmen and generated a demand for prefabricated buildings that could be erected rapidly. However, prefabricated buildings dating from the 1850s are quite rare in NSW, particularly buildings manufactured on the continent. Victoria retains a number of prefabricated buildings erected in the 1850s including The Heights, Aphrasia Street, Newton, Greater Geelong. This prefabricated house, one of a number imported by Frederick Bauer from Hamburg may have been manufactured by the same firm who made Bordier's houses. It is a far more substantial house, with 14 rooms and does not retain the same level of decorative detail as The Chalet, although timber fretwork could have been removed. The manufacturer of the Heights and Bordier's cottages has not been determined.

Bordier was ultimately unsuccessful in selling the properties and his estate was placed in sequestration in May 1856, as a result of bankruptcy. Etienne Bordier sold the estate to Didier Joubert, returned to Switzerland in the late 1850s and died in Paris in 1861.

The first of the four prefabricated houses, the house to the north of The Chalet, possibly known as Muirbank, was the first to be demolished. The land was subdivided and the house demolished by Gerald Halligan, the NSW Government Hydrographer at the start of the twentieth century.

Sommerville, or the Hut was purchased by steamboat proprietor (he bought the Parramatta Steamship Co. in 1873, running 20 steamers during the years of his ownership (1875–79), was three-time Mayor of Hunters Hill, Sydney City Councillor and member of the NSW Legislative Assembly)) Charles Jeanneret, in 1857 and demolished in the 1950s. Jeanneret purchased the adjacent Wybalena estate and operated a private ferry service and a pleasure grounds in the next bay. He built a series of substantial dwellings for his family members and has left a legacy of at least 16 stone houses in Hunters Hill.

The third cottage, was purchased by the Bellinghams, then the Deputy Surveyor of NSW, Robert Desmond Fitzgerald, and subsequently by the French consul who renamed it Croissy. Remnants of the garden established by Fitzgerald, whose passion was orchids, are thought to survive, the house does not, it was demolished in the 1960s. Its name is recorded in Croissy Avenue. Irving et al. note that Croissy and The Chalet were almost identical.

The four houses were not named initially. The Chalet changed hands three times until it was purchased by William Jack and named "The Bungalow" in 1867. It was subsequently occupied by the City Architect William Sapsford. William Herbert Manning, a barrister purchased the house and it was renamed Yerton. He subdivided the land, creating three waterfront lots. The former driveway of The Chalet became Yerton Avenue. Three of the later names of Bordier's prefabricated houses are recorded in the street layout: Yerton Avenue, Croissy Avenue and Muirbank Avenue.

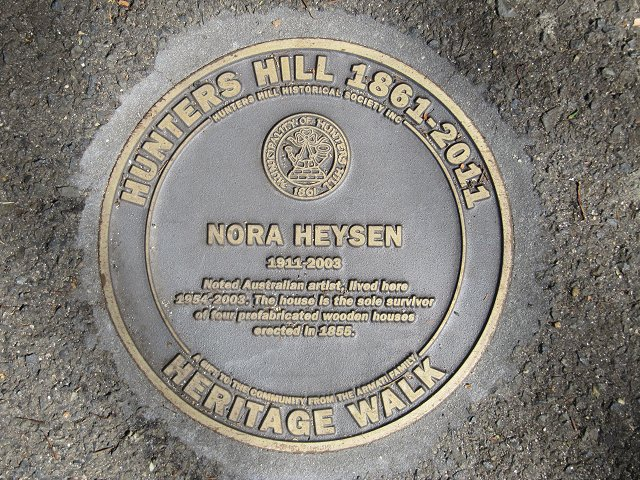
Plaque commemorating Nora Heysen's occupation of the house.

The Chalet was purchased by Robert Black, a specialist in Tropical Diseases, and his wife, the artist Nora Heysen, in 1954. Heysen had first met Robert Black in New Guinea during World War II whilst serving as the official war artist. The house may have been selected for its Germanic detailing. From an interview in 1965 Nora Heysen said "Now I think I've found my own environment. The house itself is about 120 years old, in a very wandering wilderness of a garden where I can grow my own flowers for painting, and the atmosphere is peaceful and very conducive to my work." The couple separated in 1972, with Nora retaining the house in Hunters Hill.

Nora Heysen (1911–2003), the daughter of Sir Hans Heysen (1877–1968), was born in Hahndorf in South Australia in 1911. She settled in Sydney in 1938 and has been awarded both the Order of Australia and the Australia Council's Award for Achievement in the Arts. Nora Black was the first female winner of the Archibald prize for portraiture in 1938 at age 27, was also awarded the L J Harvey Memorial prize, Qld Art Gallery, in 1973, and is recognised as one of Australia's foremost female painters. Her works are hung in the State galleries of SA, NSW and Queensland, and regional galleries at Armidale, Ballarat, Hamilton and Newcastle and the Australian War Memorial, Canberra.

Nora married Dr Robert Black in 1953, having met in New Guinea where she was Australia's first woman war artist and he a specialist in tropical medicine. After the marriage ended she continued to live in The Chalet. She often worked at her art on the back verandah.

The surviving example of The Chalet from the group of (originally four) cottages in Hunters Hill remains a very rare example of the mid nineteenth century prefabrication, with the majority of such building groups, both nineteenth and twentieth century, being military buildings. Other examples of German craftsmanship survive in South Australia, notably in the Barossa Valley.

== Description ==
=== Garden ===
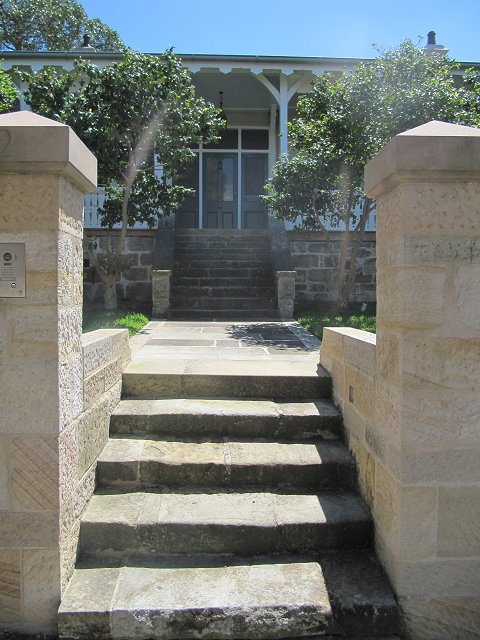
Broad steps

The garden surrounds the house on the southern, western and northern sides. Its main extent is to the west. Broad sandstone steps lead from Yerton Avenue into the garden. More steps lead to the house's wide front verandah. A billowing shrubbery fills the front (south) and side (west) garden, and on the side gate an old steel helmet hung (in 1979 under Heysen's occupation).

The rear (north) verandah is on a similar level to the lawn. Here Nora Heysen loved to work, sit, smoke, drink coffee, feed magpies and sometimes entertain friends. Here she would stand her easel, often painting flowers from the garden, especially roses - old fashioned snowy "Frau Karl Druschki" and delicate pink "Souvenir de Malmaison" ('Father's favourite' (Hans Heysen). Cottage bunches of flowers composed of whatever was in season were common painting subjects. Jonquils, snowdrops, grape hyacinths, scillas (bluebells), daffodils, lachenalias, polyanthus, primulas, iris and love-in-a-mist (Nigella damascena) in spring. In summer: zinnias, daisies, dahlias, fuchsias, salvias, freesias, columbines (Aquilegia), delphiniums, poppies and more unusual flowers.

Many cottage garden flowers (shrubs, bulbs, perennials) reflect Nora Heysen's period of occupation and interests, being often depicted in her paintings of flowers from the garden, especially roses. Cottage bunches of flowers composed of whatever was in season were common subjects. Nora grew many flowers herself on the sunny side of the house, always planting a special bed of anemones, which she loved to paint because they were her mother (Selma Heysen, known as Sally)'s favourite. In the hall she always kept a "Souvenir de Malmaison" rose under her pencil portrait of Hans Heysen, and in her light-filled bedroom hung another of his favourites - her painting of spring flowers. Lilac (Syringa vulgaris cv.s) was another of Hans Heysen's favourites.

The back garden was overhung with a magnificent mature Moreton Bay fig (Ficus macrophylla) in the north-western corner, an enormous jacaranda (J.mimosifolia) glorious in spring with mauve flowers. Its canopy, loved by birds, provided ideal conditions beneath for masses of busy-lizzies/water fuchsias (Impatiens sp.) in glowing scarlet, crimson, coral and pink and the garden often fluttered with butterflies.

The garden complements the house and contains a wide variety of interesting plants. An unusually large indigenous cheese tree (Glochidion ferdinandii) stands to the south-west of and close to the house. Many roses that appear to be from the Federation period may be significant in their own right. Other plantings that give character to the house include mid twentieth-century camellias, numerous bulbs (snowdrops, jonquils (Narcissus x 'Earlicheer'), belladonna lilies (Amaryllis x belladonna)), Citrus trees, screens of bamboo (particularly to the west), and subtropical / temperate perennials (Arum lilies (Zantedeschia aethiopica), ginger (Hedychium/Alpinia spp.), Kaffir lilies (Clivia miniata), prayer plants (Maranta sp.)). The garden in 2006 was very overgrown.

Under the Moreton Bay fig tree in the north-western corner, a smaller Illawarra flame tree (Brachychion acerifolium), jacaranda and a firewheel tree (Stenocarpus sinuatus) try to compete with the fig, unsuccessfully.

=== House ===
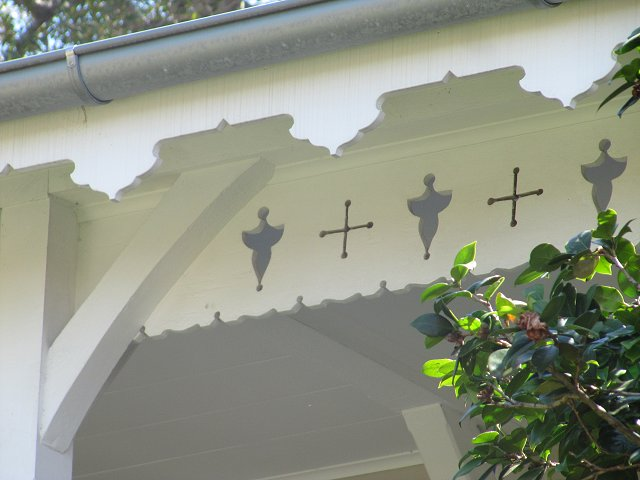
Fretwork valance

The Chalet is a prefabricated single storey residence with Baltic timber walls, sandstone rubble foundations and a hipped slate roof. Its wide front verandah runs across the front (south) with a decorative fascia and a valence of fretwork behind, commanding a harbour view of the Parramatta River. The balustrade is also of timber, again with fretwork. A paved verandah where Nora Heysen often worked occurs to the rear (north) of the house, which is on a similar level to the lawn. A series of French doors open out onto the front (south) verandah and a lobby opens onto the rear veranda. The rear outbuildings have been demolished and a kitchen, dining room and living room added to the east. Externally the detail of the veranda has been continued. The front stair is to the eastern end of the building, in contrast to the now demolished Croissy where it was central.

AlthoughThe Chalet appears similar in form to colonial Georgian buildings, it was not necessarily specifically designed for Australian conditions and may have been a picturesque "Swiss Cottage" or "Bavarian Cottage" popular in the late eighteenth and early nineteenth century. The London Suburb of Swiss Cottage records such decorative buildings. The entrance hall is at one end of the building, a feature not usually found in colonial Georgian bungalows. Mid nineteenth century American pattern books contain examples of carpenter gothic buildings with double valences and verandas, frequently to more than one elevation. The Chalet is less substantial than a traditional Swiss Chalet, which was usually raised up above the ground to allow for storage areas on the lower level.

The timber components were reputedly numbered with "code markings like roman numerals" as was common practice. Dowel fixings were used. The extent to which evidence of this construction has survived has not been determined. Photographs of the exterior of the building show that the prefabrication is evident in the sidewalls. The veranda appears to have its own structure, with cross bracing to the supporting posts and into the front walls of the house, an unusual detail for Australia. The outer layer of fretwork to the veranda conceals the ends of the rafters, a practical detail that protects them from water entry.

The cosy dining room with its corner fireplace was (in the Heysen period) overlaid with a patina of form and patterns - New Guinea carvings, including the beautiful bowl painted in "The Flower Ship" (1945); fruit, quinces, pomegranates, persimmons, pears enjoyed as much for shape, colour and texture as taste; "Art in Australia" magazines; paintings by fellow artists and, in the centre of the round cedar table, always a low bowl of mixed flowers - whatever took Nora's fancy each morning. Tropical shells adorned the spacious old sunlit bathroom with its black and white tiled floor.

Paintings were stacked in the front hall and around the walls of Heysen's studio.

A sandstone outbuilding is situated in the gardens with timber joinery and a hipped corrugated iron roof.

=== Condition ===
As of 2004, the site had been in known European occupation since 1855, and may yield cultural deposits, including the footings of outbuildings, from the earlier period of settlement on the Hunters Hill peninsula.

The garden in 2006 was very overgrown.

Apart from an extension in masonry of apparent late 19th century construction to the east, and some minor internal alterations, The Chalet is intact, and exhibits a remarkable degree of integrity.

=== Modifications and dates ===
19th century masonry-walled extensions to the eastern portion. The rear outbuildings have been demolished and a kitchen, dining room and living room added to the east. Externally the detail of the veranda has been continued.

=== Further information ===
Interior not inspected, although the interior is illustrated in "Fine Houses of Sydney" by Irving et.al.

== Heritage listing ==
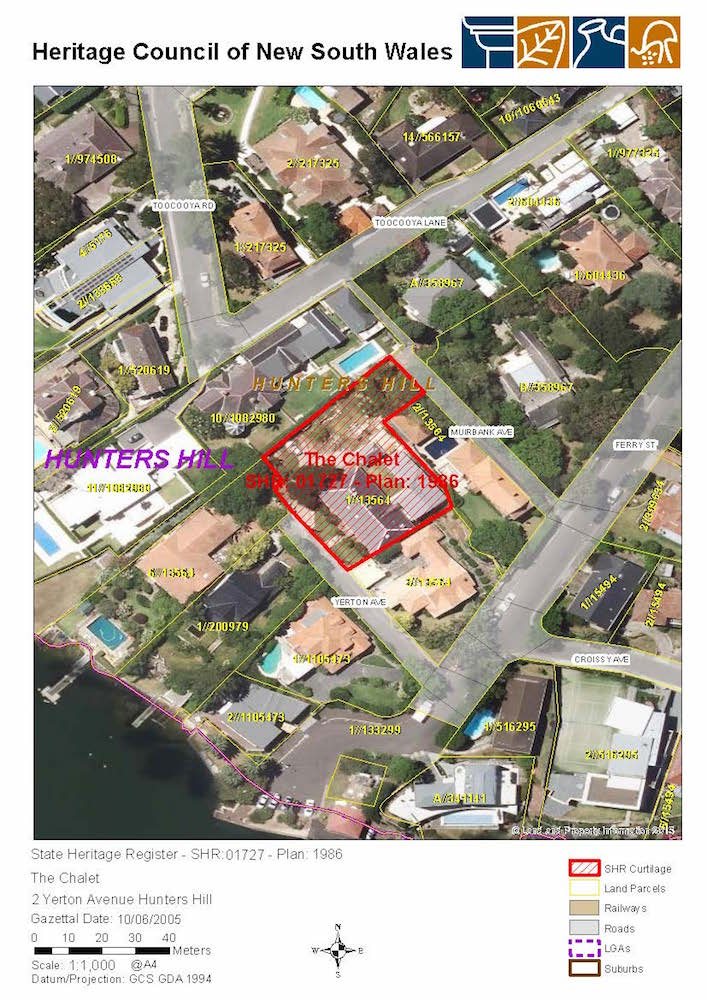
Heritage boundaries

As at 2 January 2013, The Chalet was a very rare and distinctive example of an early prefabricated timber Swiss cottage in Australia. Dating from 1855, the house was imported from Hamburg, Germany, by Swiss emigre, Leonardo Etienne Bordier, and erected by indentured German tradesmen at sab Hill, an early French settlement of Sydney. The house remains the only surviving cottage of four prefabricated cottages originally erected as part of Bordier's planned speculative development at Hunters Hill.

Aesthetically, The Chalet is distinctive and rare in Australia as a fine, highly crafted example of a picturesque and authentic Swiss or possibly Bavarian timber cottage from the Victorian period, imported from Germany, and erected by indentured specialist German tradesmen for a Swiss emigre. The Swiss cottage is complete with its original collection of fine, decorative details, such as moulded timber joinery and doors, door hardware, fixtures and fittings, all of a distinctive French style which is very rare for Australia. The prefabricated house design may have been a prototype for the 1855 Paris Industrial Exhibition erected in Hamburg where Bordier purchased the house in 1854.

Historically, The Chalet represents a remarkable aspect of Australia's early history of immigration and settlement by European immigrants during the 19th Century, associated with the 1850s gold rush. It demonstrates the early use of imported prefabricated buildings to address the housing shortage due to the 1850s gold rush, and provides remnant evidence of the first planned group of houses at Hunters Hill. The subdivision, house and gardens also provide evidence of one of the first examples of Garden Suburb development in Australia's oldest Garden Suburb, Hunters Hill, which predated the Garden Suburb movement.

Technically, The Chalet represents a rare surviving example of timber prefabrication from Hamburg, as the majority of prefabricated building components used in Australia during the gold rush period were ordered from Great Britain. The only other known timber example from Hamburg is located in Geelong, Victoria.

The property is also significant for its association with artist Nora Heysen, who lived and worked at The Chalet from 1954 until her death in 2003. Nora Heysen (1911–2003) is recognised as one of Australia's foremost female painters and was the first woman war artist in World War II and the first female recipient of the coveted Archibald Prize in 1938 at age 27.

The garden complements the house and contains a wide variety of interesting plants. An unusually large indigenous cheese tree (Glochidion ferdinandii) stands to the west of the house. Many roses that appear to be from the Federation period may be significant in their own right. Many cottage garden flowers (shrubs, bulbs, perennials) reflect Nora Heysen's period of occupation and interests, being often depicted in her paintings of flowers from the garden, especially roses. Cottage bunches of flowers composed of whatever was in season were common subjects.

The Chalet was listed on the New South Wales State Heritage Register on 10 June 2005 having satisfied the following criteria.

The place is important in demonstrating the course, or pattern, of cultural or natural history in New South Wales.

The Chalet represents a very rare and early surviving Australian example of a prefabricated timber cottage imported from Hamburg, Germany by ship. It is the only surviving cottage from a group of four identical prefabricated cottages purchased in 1854 by Swiss emigre Leonardo Etienne Bordier and erected by specially engaged Germany tradesmen at the early French settlement of Sydney at Hunters Hill on two of the earliest land grants of the suburb.

The subdivision, house and gardens provide remnant evidence of the first planned group of houses in Hunters Hill, as a speculative development of the Garden Suburb philosophy, which was to characterise the development of Hunters Hill. They also demonstrate one of the first examples of Garden Suburb development in Australia's oldest Garden Suburb, Hunters Hill, which predated the Garden Suburb movement.

The house further illustrates the early use of imported prefabricated buildings to address the housing shortage due to the 1850s gold rush.

Overall, this 19th Century speculative development in an early French settlement of Sydney, and its planning, design, origins, construction and associations, all represent a remarkable aspect of Australia's early history of immigration and settlement by European immigrants during the 19th Century, associated with the 1850s gold rush.

The place has a strong or special association with a person, or group of persons, of importance of cultural or natural history of New South Wales's history.

The development was carried out by Etienne Bordier a Swiss immigrant who was one of a number of French/ French Swiss founders of Hunters Hill.

The property is also has associated with Didier Numa Joubert, and Charles Edward Jeanneret, also prominent early citizens of Hunters Hill and mayors of the Council which is one of the few early (1861) councils that maintains its original boundaries.

The Chalet is associated with prominent Australian artist, Nora Heysen (1911-2003), the first female recipient of the Archibald prize, who lived and worked at The Chalet from 1954 until her death in 2003. Nora Heysen served as a war artist in WWII and is recognised as one of Australia's foremost female painters. She has been awarded both the Order of Australia and the Australia Council's Award for Achievement in the Arts. Nora Heysen and her husband may have selected the house for its Germanic detailing. From an interview in 1965 Nora Heysen said "Now I think I've found my own environment. The house itself is about 120 years old, in a very wandering wilderness of a garden where I can grow my own flowers for painting, and the atmosphere is peaceful and very conducive to my work."

The place is important in demonstrating aesthetic characteristics and/or a high degree of creative or technical achievement in New South Wales.

The Chalet is distinctive and rare in Australia as a fine, highly crafted example of a picturesque and authentic Swiss or possibly Bavarian timber cottage from the Victorian period, dating from 1855, imported from Germany, erected by indentured specialist German tradesmen for a Swiss émigré. The Swiss cottage is complete with its original collection of fine, decorative details, such as moulded timber joinery and doors, door hardware, fixtures and fittings, all of a distinctive French style which is very rare for Australia. The prefabricated house design may have been a prototype for the 1855 Paris Industrial Exhibition erected in Hamburg where Bordier purchased the house in 1854.

The place has a strong or special association with a particular community or cultural group in New South Wales for social, cultural or spiritual reasons.

The Chalet is well known and important to the community's sense of place as a landmark of Hunters Hill, which embodies many of its distinctive characteristics and represents the early history of the area, its origins as a Garden Suburb and as an early French settlement of Sydney.

The place has potential to yield information that will contribute to an understanding of the cultural or natural history of New South Wales.

The Chalet has research potential for improving an understanding of the types of imported "knock-down" prefabricated cottages imported into Australia during the 1850s gold rush era, and on the construction techniques and craftsmanship of indentured German carpenters in Australia during this period.

The Chalet has potential to yield information on 19th century timber prefabrication from Hamburg, constructed of Baltic Pine with dowelled timber joining details and elements marked in Roman numerals, which is very rare in Australia as the majority of prefabricated building components used in Australia during the gold rush period were ordered from Great Britain. The only other known timber example from Hamburg is situated in Geelong, Victoria.

The place possesses uncommon, rare or endangered aspects of the cultural or natural history of New South Wales.

Prefabricated timber cottages sourced from the Germany are very rare in Australia. The Chalet is one of only two 1850s buildings of this type known to be extant in Australia, which can provide evidence of the housing development in response to the influx of immigrants for the 1850s gold rush. The Chalet is the only surviving cottage of the group of four identical prefabricated cottages constructed at Hunters Hill.

The place is important in demonstrating the principal characteristics of a class of cultural or natural places/environments in New South Wales.

This speculative development in an early French settlement of Sydney, in the planning, design, origins, construction and associations of the house and gardens, represents a remarkable aspect of Australia's early history of immigration and settlement by European immigrants during the 19th Century, associated with the 1850s gold rush.

The Chalet represents a fine, highly crafted example of a Swiss prefabricated timber cottage from the Victorian period, imported from Hamburg Germany and erected by indentured specialist German tradesmen for a Swiss emigre.

The subdivision, house and gardens also represent one of the first examples of Garden Suburb development in Australia's oldest Garden Suburb, Hunters Hill, which predated the Garden Suburb movement.

== See also ==
- Australian residential architectural styles
